= List of Russian weaponry makers =

This list of Russian weaponry makers includes the famous weaponry inventors and engineers of the Tsardom of Russia, Russian Empire, the Soviet Union and the Russian Federation.

== Alphabetical list ==
=== A ===
- Nikolay Afanasiev, developer of TKB-011 2M bullpup assault rifle

=== C ===
- Andrey Chokhov, maker of the Tsar Cannon, the world's largest bombard by caliber

=== D ===
- Vasily Degtyaryov, designer of Degtyaryov-series firearms, co-developer of Fedorov Avtomat, inventor of self-loading carbine
- Yevgeny Dragunov, designer of the Dragunov sniper rifle

=== F ===
- Ivan Fyodorov, 16th century inventor of multibarreled mortar, introduced printing to Russia
- Vladimir Fyodorov, one of the chief pioneers of the battle rifle (Fedorov Avtomat) and general-purpose machine gun.

=== G ===
Gobyato

- Leonid Gobyato, inventor of modern mortar
- Vasiliy Grabin, designer of the ZiS-2 anti-tank gun, the best of World War II and one of the most produced in history

=== K ===
- Mikhail Kalashnikov, inventor of AK-47 and AK-74 assault rifles, world's most popular (produced more than all other types of assault rifles combined)
- Yuly Khariton, chief designer of the Soviet atomic bomb, co-developer of the Tsar Bomb
- Nikolai Kibalchich, pioneer of rocketry. The International Astronomical Union honoured the rocketry pioneer by naming a crater on the Moon Kibal'chich.
- Sergei Korolyov, inventor of the soviet unions intercontinental ballistic missile (R-7 Semyorka)
- Mikhail Koshkin, designer of T-34 medium tank, the most produced tank of World War II

=== L ===
- Semyon Lavochkin, designer of the La-series aircraft and the first operational surface-to-air missile S-25 Berkut
- Nikolai Lebedenko, designer of the Tsar Tank, the largest armoured vehicle in history

=== M ===
- Nikolay Makarov, designed the Makarov pistol, the Soviet Union's standard military side arm from 1951 to 1991
- Victor Makeev, inventor of the Soviet Unions submarine-launched ballistic missile
- Nestor Makhno, anarchist, legendary inventor of tachanka
- Alexander Morozov, designer of T-54/55 (the most produced tank in history), co-developer of T-34
- Sergey Mosin, inventor of the Mosin–Nagant rifle, one of the most produced in history to this day

=== N ===
- Alexander Nadiradze, creator of the Soviet Unions first mobile ICBM (RT-21 Temp 2S) and the Soviet Union's first reliable mobile ICBM RT-2PM Topol
- Andrey Nartov, polymath inventor, designed quick-firing battery and cannon telescopic sight
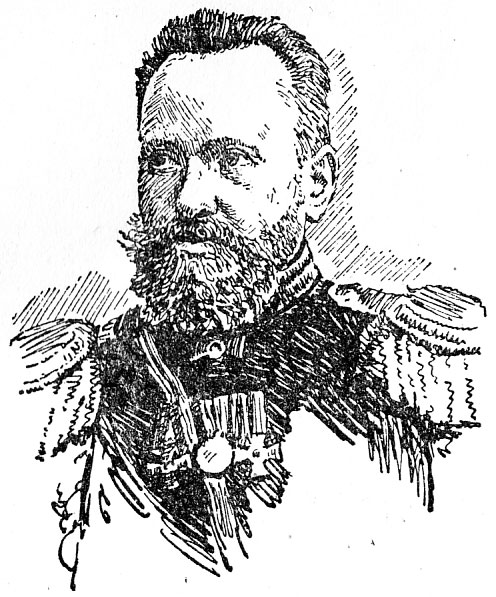
  Mosin
- Sergey Nepobedimy, designed the first supersonic anti-tank guided missile Sturm and other Soviet rocket weaponry
- Gennadiy Nikonov, inventor of the AN-94 assault rifle with the "straight-back bolt" scheme
- Aleksandr Nudelman, inventor of the NS-37, NS-23, N-37, NS-45, N-57, NS-76, NR-23, NR-30 autocannons, S-5, S-8, S-25 rockets, the 3M11 Falanga missile and its variants, the 9K112 Kobra, the Strela-1, 9K35 Strela-10

=== P ===
- Nikolay Popov, designed the first operational gas turbine tank T-80
- Aleksandr Porokhovschikov, inventor of Vezdekhod (Russias first prototype continuous track tank, or tankette, and the first Russian continuous track amphibious ATV)

=== S ===
- Andrei Sakharov, physicist, inventor of explosively pumped flux compression generator, co-developer of the Tsar Bomb, Nobel Peace Prize winner
- Pavel Schilling, inventor of Russias electric mine
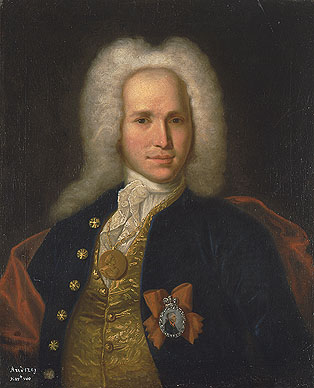
  Nartov
- Vyacheslav Silin, designer of the Silin machine gun
- Georgi Shpagin, designer of the PPSh-41 submachine gun
- Boris Shavyrin, inventor of air-augmented rocket
- Boris Shpitalniy, inventor of the aircraft ShKAS machine gun and ShVAK cannon
- Pyotr Shuvalov, founder of Izhevsk, inventor of canister shot mortar, introduced the unicorne mortar
- Sergei Simonov, designer of the SKS carbine, and AO-31 and AG-043 assault rifles
- Vladimir Simonov, inventor of underwater assault rifle and AO-63 assault rifle
- Alexey Sudayev, designer of the PPS submachine gun

=== T ===
- Peter Tkachev, inventor of the Balanced Automatic Recoil System and designer of the TsNIITochMash AO-63 assault rifle
- Fedor Tokarev, designer of TT-33 handgun and SVT-40 self-loading rifle, Soviet weapons used in World War II, also the leader of the EAI

=== U ===
- Vladimir Utkin, designer of the railcar-launched ICBM (RT-23 Molodets)

=== V ===
- Ivan Vyrodkov, creator of Russia's battery-tower

== See also ==
- List of Russian weaponry
- List of Russian inventors
- List of Russian inventions
- Defence industry of Russia
