= 1922 (disambiguation) =

1922 is a year.

1922 may also refer to:

== Arts, entertainment, and media ==
- 1922 (1978 film), a Greek drama film directed by Nikos Koundouros
- 1922 (novella), a 2010 novella by Stephen King
  - 1922 (2017 film), an American horror film based on King's novella

== Weapons ==
- FN Model 1922, a pistol
- Fyodorov–Shpagin Model 1922, a machine gun
- Springfield Model 1922, a bolt-action rifle

== Other uses ==
- 1922 Committee, the parliamentary group of the Conservative Party in the UK House of Commons
- Submarine 1922, a submarine volcano
