= AVS-36 =

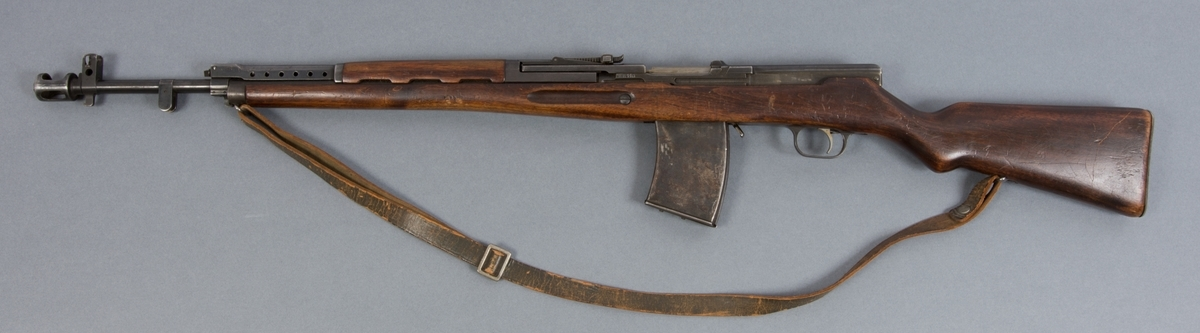
- A 1939 AVS-36 rifle
- Type: Battle rifle
- Place of origin: Soviet Union

Service history
- In service: 1936–1953
- Used by: See users
- Wars: Soviet-Japanese Border Wars; Spanish Civil War; Winter War; World War II; Korean War; Lebanese Civil War

Production history
- Designer: Sergei Simonov
- Designed: 1936
- No. built: 35,000 – 65,500

Specifications
- Mass: 4.3 kg (9.5 lb)
- Length: 1.23 m (48.4 in)
- Barrel length: 612 mm (24 in)
- Cartridge: 7.62×54mmR
- Action: Gas-operated, vertically lifting locking block with secondary Flappers
- Rate of fire: 800 rounds/min
- Muzzle velocity: 840 m/s (2,756 ft/s)
- Effective firing range: 600 m (2,000 ft)
- Feed system: 15-round detachable box magazine
- Sights: 1,500 m (4,900 ft)

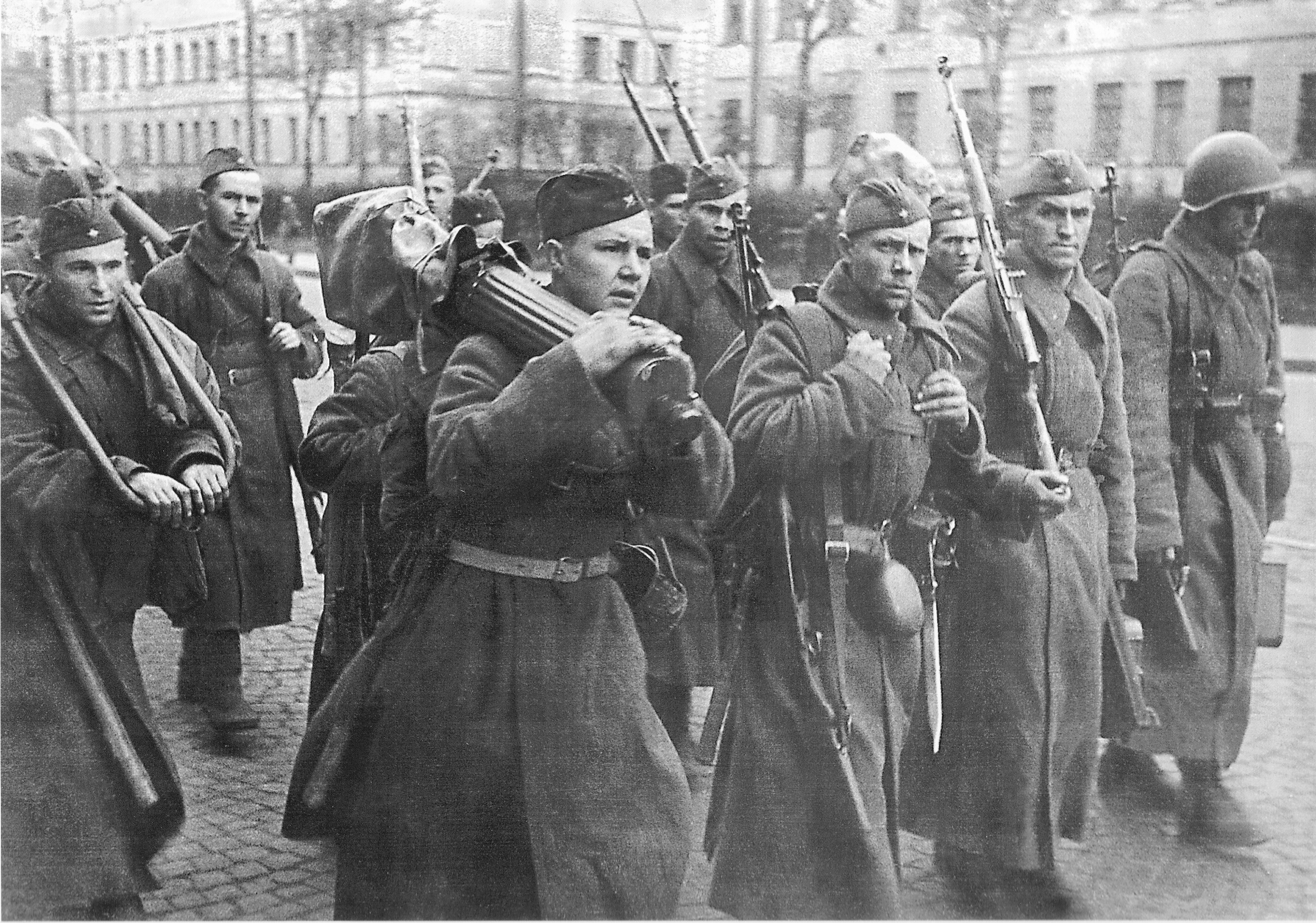
Red Army reinforcements during the Siege of Leningrad in 1941. The 3 sergeants in the front row are equipped with AVS-36.

The AVS-36 (Russian: Автоматическая винтовка Симонова образца 1936 года (АВС-36); Avtomaticheskaya vintovka Simonova obraztsa 1936 goda (AVS-36); "Automatic rifle Simonov model 1936 (AVS-36)") was a Soviet automatic rifle which saw service in the early years of World War II. It was among the early selective fire infantry rifles (capable of both semi and full-automatic fire) formally adopted for military service.

== History ==
=== Origins ===
The designer, Sergei Simonov, began his work on a gas-operated self-loading rifle in 1930. The first prototype was ready in 1931 and appeared promising. Three years later a trial batch of an improved design was made. In 1935, a competition between Simonov's design and a rifle made by Fedor Tokarev was held. The Simonov rifle emerged as the winner and was accepted into service as the AVS-36. The AVS-36 was first seen in public in the 1938 May Day parade in Moscow, when it was displayed by the marching 1st Rifle Division. The American public became aware of it when it was covered in the August 1942 issue of the American Infantry Journal, in an article by John Garrett Underhill Jr.

=== Service ===
Once in service, it quickly became apparent that the AVS was not a satisfactory design; the operating mechanism was overcomplicated, and the problem was made worse by the rifle's construction which let dirt get inside the weapon. The rifle was also particular about ammunition quality. The muzzle brake design proved to be quite successful, as the rifle had very little overall climb, however its intense recoil impulse still meant the rifle was impractical in automatic fire. Some of the problems with the rifle in the field were thought to be the magazine, which was deemed too long. Production of the AVS-36 was terminated in 1940 after about 34,000 were produced, and a new design competition was held to which Simonov and Tokarev submitted their improved designs.

In 1938, Tokarev's SVT-38 was also adopted for service. In 1939 a politicized dispute erupted within the Soviet elite as to which design, that of Simonov or that of Tokarev, should prevail. Simonov's rifle was lighter and contained fewer parts, while Tokarev's rifle was considered sturdier, although this was mainly due to firing pin breakages on Simonov's rifle. Both guns had their supporters and detractors among the Politburo. Stalin ultimately sided with Tokarev, with whom he had a good personal relationship. By a decision of the Defense Committee dated 17 July 1939, mass production was to concentrate on the SVT-38.

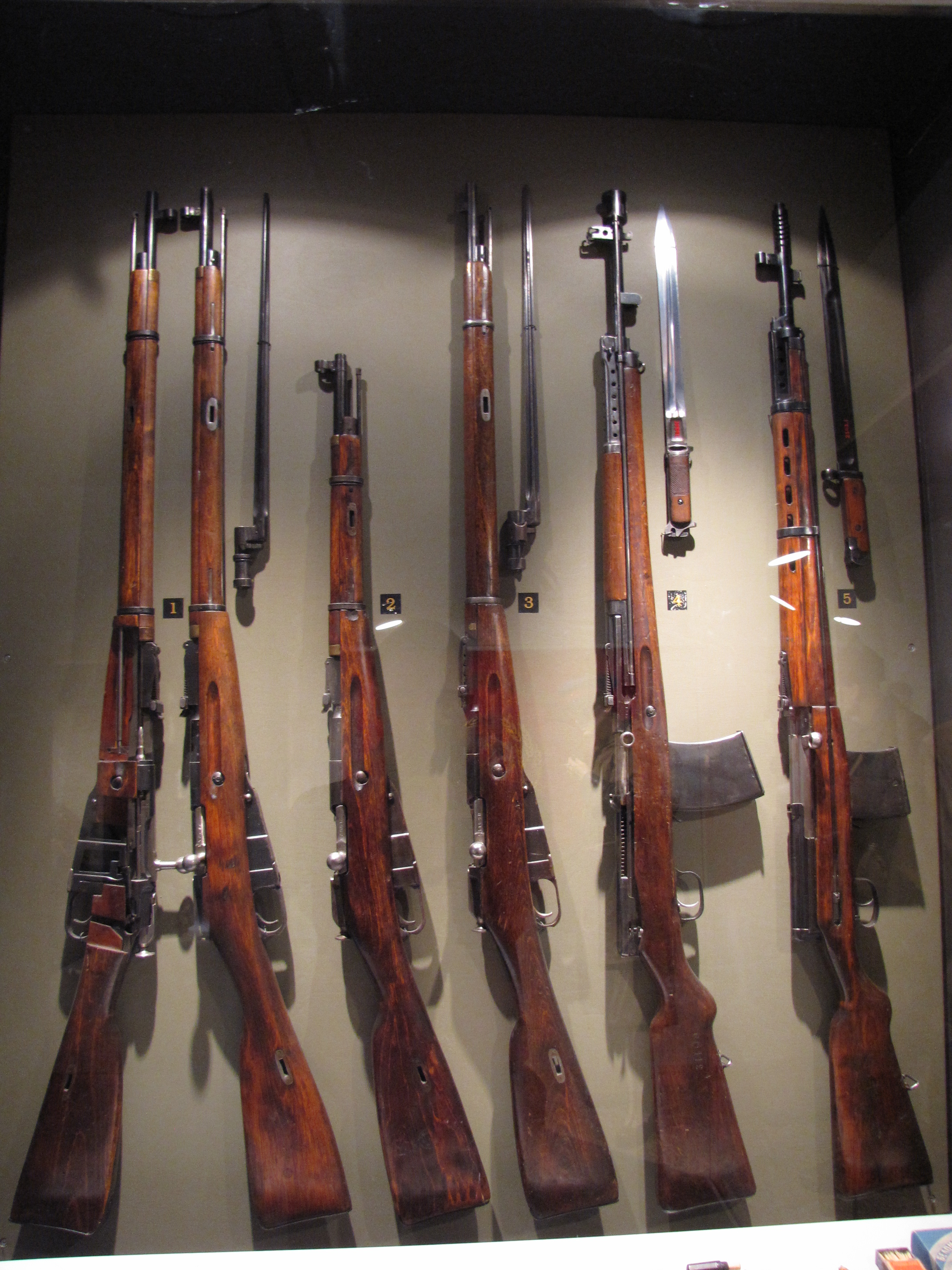
Red Army World War II rifles. L–R: Mosin–Nagant M/91-30, Mosin–Nagant M/38 Carbine, Mosin–Nagant M91 Dragoon Rifle, AVS-36, and SVT-38.

Official Soviet production breakdown figures are: 106 made in 1934, 286 in 1935, 10,280 made in 1937, 24,401 in 1938, with an estimated total of 65,800 AVS-36s manufactured until production stopped in 1940 (exact production figures for some years, like 1936 or 1939, is not reported).

The new weapon would be tested during the Spanish Civil War when small numbers were shipped to Republican forces.

=== World War II and beyond ===
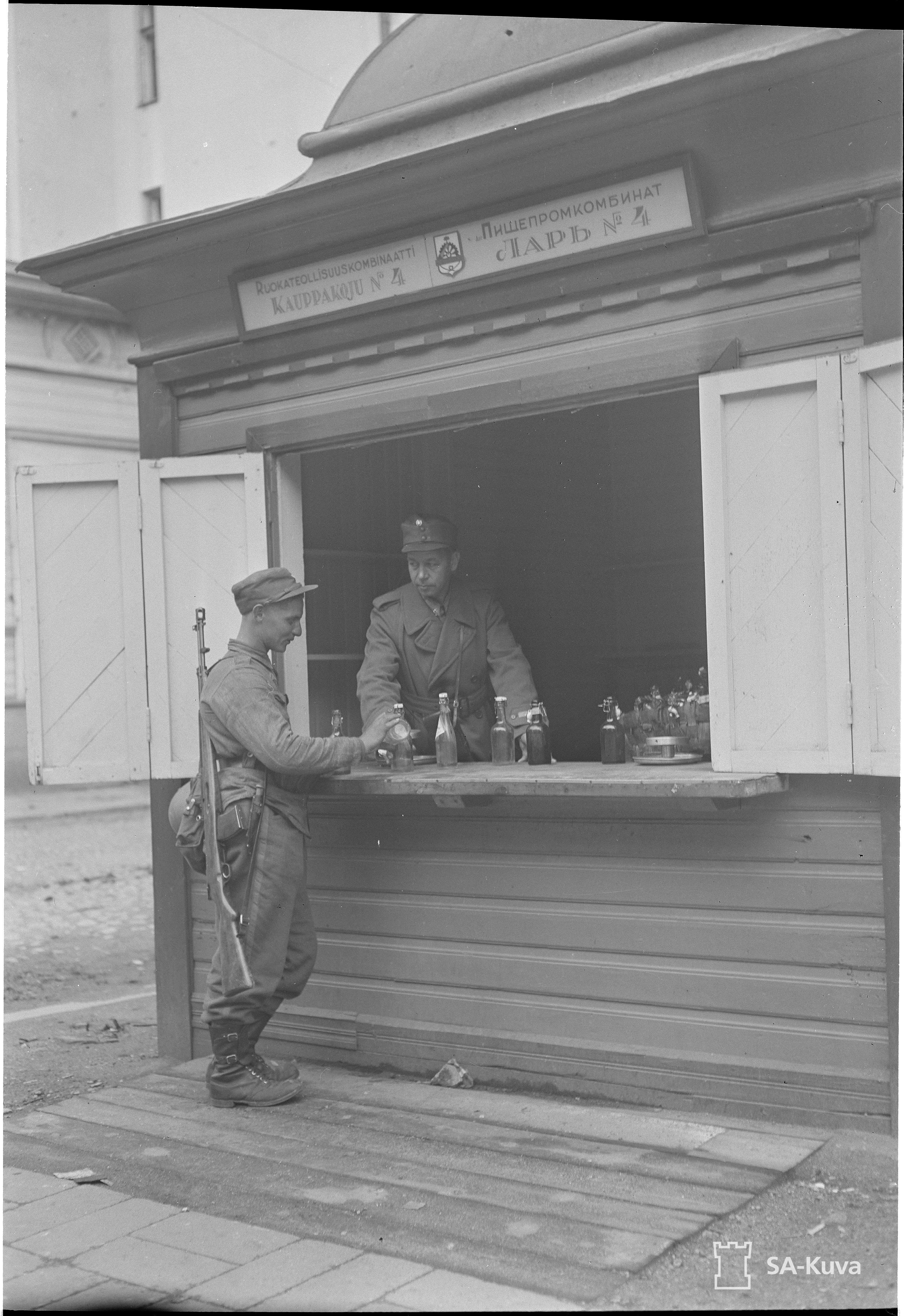
A Finnish soldier of the Civil Guard armed with an AVS-36 at a kiosk in Vyborg following the Battle of Vyborg in August 1941

The rifle first saw service in the Battle of Khalkhin Gol, and later in the Winter War, but did not perform well. Some of the problems were caused by incorrect maintenance; many rifles went into combat without having been cleaned of their storage grease, which then "froze" solid. About 300 AVS-36 examples were captured by the Finns; some were used by their new owners. The SVT-38s and LS-26s used on the Finnish side suffered from similar problems. After a large amount of the more serviceable SVTs were captured, the AVS-36s were largely withdrawn from service. In the Soviet Union, the AVS was quickly marginalized and apparently withdrawn from service during 1941, however pictures exist of it in service as late as 1944. Some reports claim that remaining AVSs were mostly scrapped. The US Ordnance Corps tested the weapon in the early 50s along with several SVT rifles. They noted that in addition to the Soviet's findings, the weapon's gas system, which had a sleeve that moves around the rear sight, also had a habit of loosening the rear sight over time resulting in inaccuracy. During the Lebanese Civil War, the Syrian Social Nationalist Party found itself often armed only with antiquated or outdated weaponry, including 60 AVS-36 rifles. Today, the AVS-36 is a rare collector's item; most of the remaining rifles in existence are in Finland.

Simonov would later design an anti-tank rifle, the PTRS-41, and the SKS carbine, which employed simpler tilting bolt operation.

== Design ==
The AVS-36 was a gas-operated rifle with a short piston stroke and vertical sliding locking block with secondary locking flappers, each of different size. It was capable of both automatic and semi-automatic fire. The barrel was equipped with a large muzzle brake to reduce recoil. Ammunition was in a detachable box magazine holding 15 rounds. A knife bayonet was issued with the rifle. A sniper version was produced in small amounts with a PE (Pritsel YEdinay, e.g. "Unified Sight") 4x variable-power optical scope in an offset side-mounted bracket on the left side.

== Users ==
- Finland
- Nazi Germany
- North Korea
- Spanish Republic
- Soviet Union
- Syrian Social Nationalist Party − Limited use during the Lebanese Civil War

== See also ==
- FG 42
- M1918 Browning Automatic Rifle
- M1941 Johnson machine gun
- List of Russian weaponry
