= PTRD-41 =

Soviet anti-tank rifle

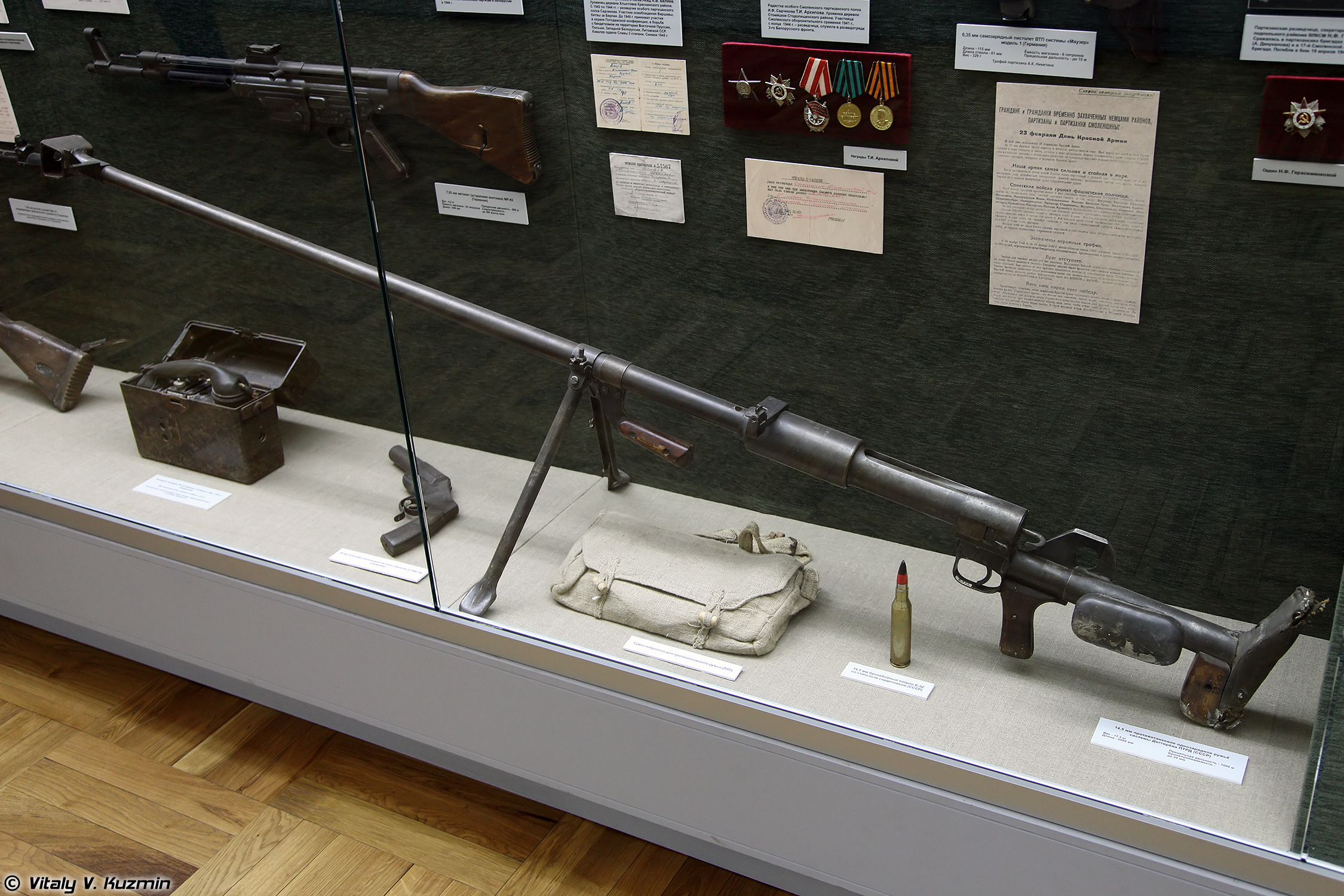
- PTRD rifle at Great Patriotic War museum in Smolensk
- Type: Anti-tank rifle
- Place of origin: Soviet Union

Service history
- In service: 1941– mid-1950s (Soviet Union)
- Used by: See Users
- Wars: World War II; Korean War; Chinese Civil War; Vietnam War; Syrian Civil War; Russo-Ukrainian War

Production history
- Designer: Vasily Degtyaryov
- Designed: 1941
- Manufacturer: Degtyaryov plant
- Produced: 1941–1944
- No. built: 293,164

Specifications
- Mass: 16 kg (35 lb)
- Length: 2,020 mm (80 in)
- Barrel length: 1,350 mm (53 in)
- Crew: 2
- Cartridge: 14.5×114mm (B-32, BS-41)
- Action: Bolt-action, short recoil
- Rate of fire: up to 8-10 rounds per minute
- Muzzle velocity: 1,012 m/s (3,320 ft/s)
- Effective firing range: 300 m (980 ft) (on personnel targets, dispersion of bullets at 300 m (980 ft) is 0.36 m (1 ft 2 in))
- Maximum firing range: 1,000 m (3,300 ft) (mainly with scope)
- Feed system: Single-shot
- Sights: Front post, rear notch

The PTRD-41 (Russian: Противотанковое однозарядное ружьё образца 1941 года системы Дегтярёва (ПТРД), romanized: Protivotankovoye odnozaryadnoye ruzhyo obraztsa 1941 goda sistemy Degtyaryova, lit. 'Anti-tank single-shot gun pattern 1941, Degtyaryov system') is an anti-tank rifle that was produced and used from 1941 by the Soviet Red Army during World War II. It is a single-shot weapon which fires the 14.5×114 mm round, which was able to penetrate German tanks such as the Panzer III and early models of the Panzer IV. Although unable to penetrate the frontal armor of late-war German tanks, it could penetrate their thinner side and top armor at close ranges as well as thinly armored self-propelled guns and half-tracks.

== History ==
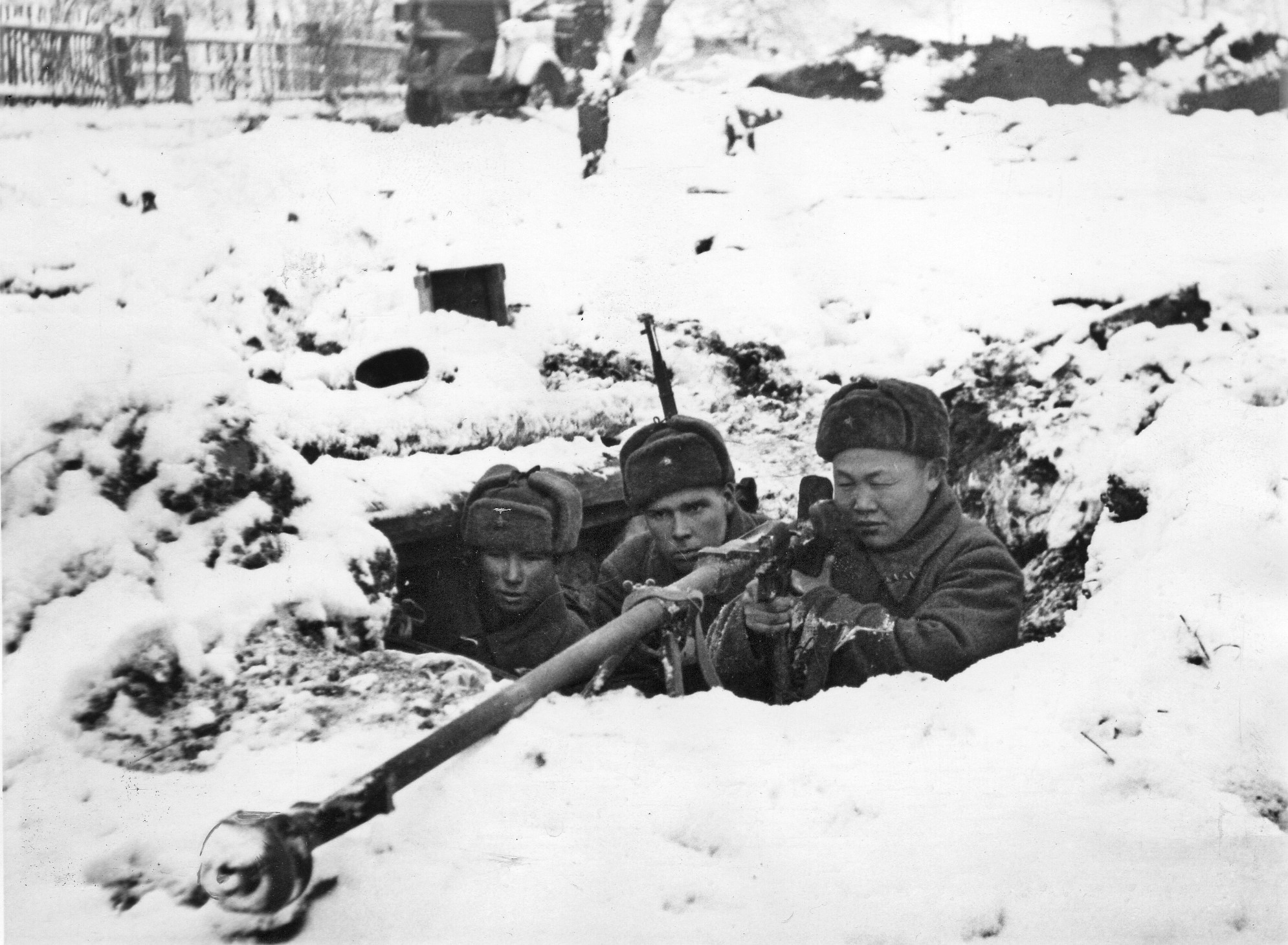
Soviet soldiers with PTRD-41 defending Moscow, 1942.

Developed soon after the outbreak of the war with Germany in July-August 1941 and put into production on the 22nd of September on the Kovrov Arms Factory, PTRD utilized the cartridge that was initially developed for the Rukavishnikov anti-tank rifle. The 14.5 mm armor-piercing bullet had a muzzle velocity of 1,012 m/s (3,320 ft/s). The 64 g (2.3 oz) bullet had a 39 g (1.4 oz) steel core and could penetrate around 30 mm (1.2 in) of armor at 500 m (1,600 ft), and 40 mm (1.6 in) of armor at 100 m (330 ft). During the initial invasion, and indeed throughout the war, most German tanks had side armor thinner than 40 mm (1.6 in) (Panzer I and Panzer II: 13–20 mm (0.51–0.79 in), Panzer III and Panzer IV series: 30 mm (1.2 in), Panzer V Panther (combat debut mid-1943): 40–50 mm (1.6–2.0 in)). The same ammunition came to be used by the later semi-automatic PTRS-41.

Guns captured by the Germans were given the designation 14.5 mm PzB 783(r). After World War II the PTRD was also used extensively by North Korean and Chinese armed forces in the Korean War. During this war, William Brophy, a US Army Ordnance officer, mounted a .50 BMG (12.7 mm) barrel to a captured PTRD to examine the effectiveness of long-range shooting. Furthermore, the US also captured a number of PTRDs in the Vietnam War. The weapon proved effective out to 1,800 m (5,900 ft).

== Design ==
PTRD is a single-shot bolt-action rifle, but with automatic opening of the bolt and extraction caused by the short recoil of the barrel akin to the German PzB 38, which was likely examined by Degtyaryov very early in the design process (as described in his postwar memoirs). Its bolt and cock-on-close firing mechanism show similarities to the Japanese Type 30 rifle, which was exported to the Russian Empire during WW1.

== Users ==
=== Current ===
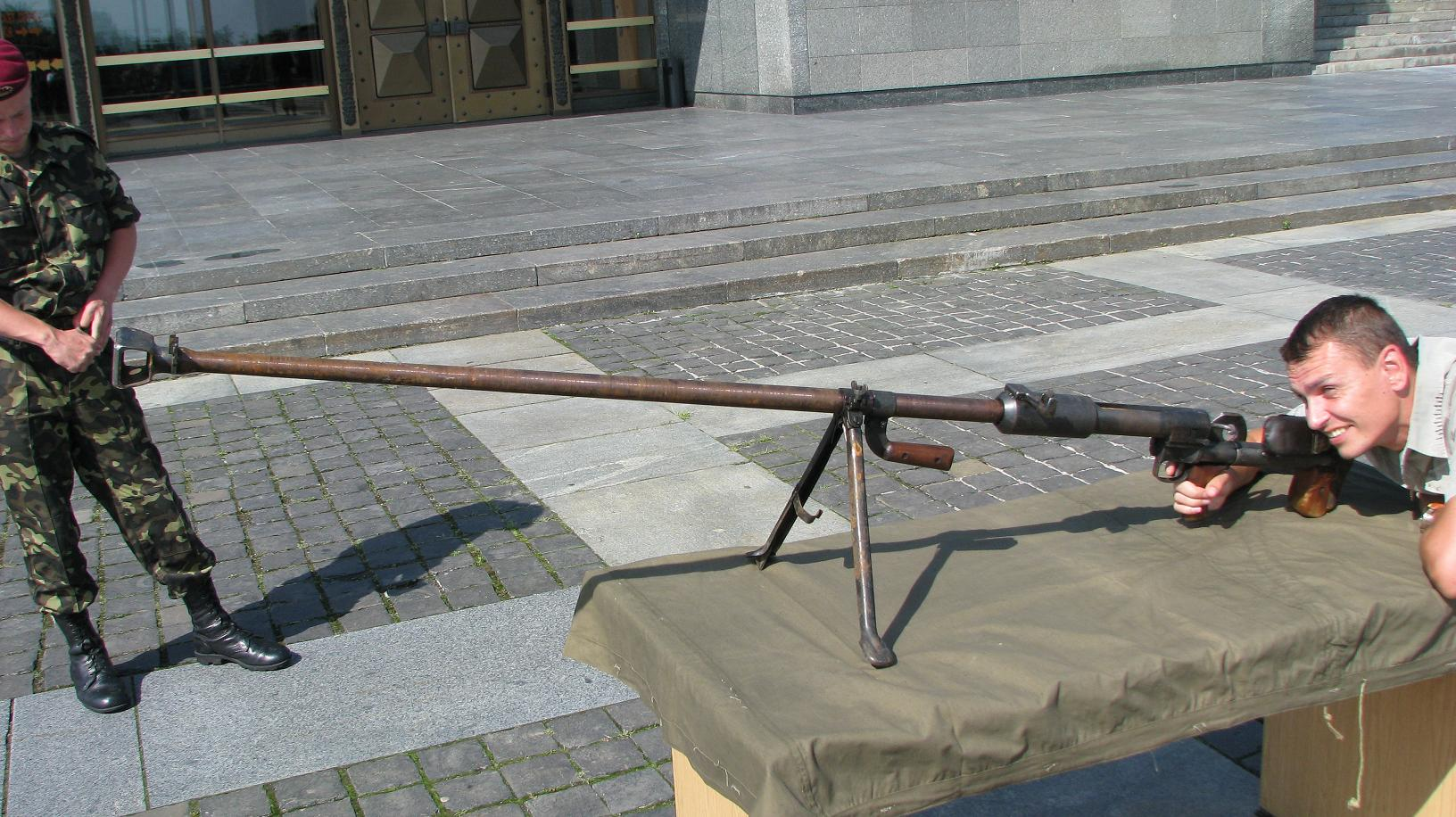
PTRD-41 in service with the Ukrainian National Guard in 2014

- Russia: Limited use in the Syrian civil war
  - Donetsk People's Republic: Used by militiamen in 2014.
- Ukraine: Limited use in the war in Donbas

=== Former ===
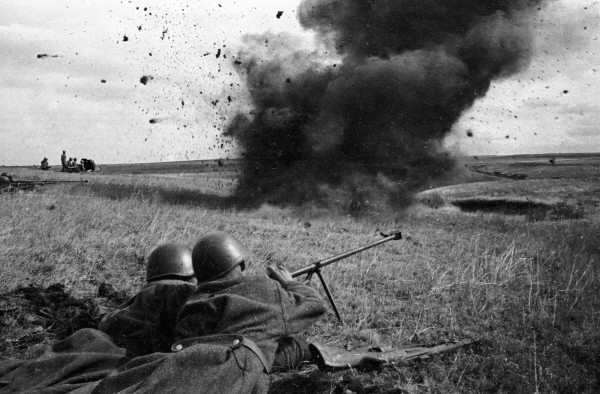
Anti-tank riflemen with PTRD on the Kursk salient.

- Albania: Used as late as 1960
- Bulgaria: Equipped with 300 items (both PTRD & PTRS) by Soviet Union between 1944 and 1945, seen in combat operations.
- China: Used by Communist rebels in the Chinese Civil War, later by the People's Volunteer Army during the Korean War.
- Czechoslovakia: Used by 1st Czechoslovak Army Corps in the USSR.
- Hungary: Used as late as 1960
- Germany: Captured and used by Wehrmacht under the title Panzerbüchse 783(r).
- North Korea: Equipped by the USSR, saw extensive combat in Korean War against M24 light tanks.
- Poland: Used by 1st Tadeusz Kościuszko Infantry Division in 1943 then by other Polish divisions.
- Romania: Used as late as 1960
- North Vietnam: In stockpile, used by Viet Cong in Vietnam War.
- USSR: Largely used in Eastern Front by the Red Army.

== See also ==
- List of Russian weaponry
- PTRS-41
