= Sergei Simonov (firearms designer) =

Russian firearm designer (1894–1986)

- Born: Sergei Gavrilovich Simonov; 4 October 1894; Fedotovo village, Vladimir Governorate, Russian Empire
- Died: 6 May 1986 (aged 91); Moscow, Soviet Union
- Occupation: Firearms designer
- Known for: Designer of the AVS-36, PTRS-41, and SKS
- Awards: Hero of Socialist Labour

Sergei Gavrilovich Simonov (Russian: Серге́й Гаври́лович Си́монов; 4 October 1894 – 6 May 1986) was a Soviet firearms designer known for the SKS carbine and the PTRS-41 anti-tank rifle. Simonov is considered one of the fathers of the modern assault rifle.

Simonov was a pioneer of automatic and semi-automatic rifles in the 1920s and 1930s, mostly under the supervision of both Vladimir Fyodorov and Fedor Tokarev. Many of Simonov's designs were adopted by the Soviet Armed Forces, with his AVS-36 being one of the first selective fire rifles adopted for military service. Simonov worked as a researcher at TsNIITochMash from 1950 to 1970.

Simonov was awarded the Hero of Socialist Labour and two first-degree State Stalin Prizes, and appointed as a deputy of the Supreme Soviet of Russia.

== Biography ==
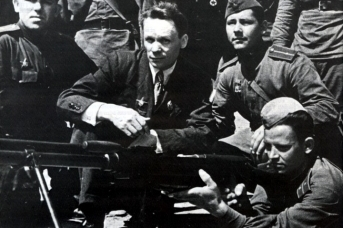
Simonov during a test of the PTRS-41 anti-tank rifle, firing 14.5×115mm rounds that he himself designed in 1941.

Sergei Gavrilovich Simonov was born on 4 October 1894 in Fedotovo, Vladimir Governorate (now Melekhovo, Vladimir Oblast) into a peasant family. Simonov received three years of primary education at a rural school before starting work in a foundry at 16-years-old. In 1915, he began training as a locksmith at a small factory, and attended a basic technician's course of instruction. By the end of World War I, Simonov was employed at the Kovrov Plant (Degtyaryov Plant) in Kovrov, which produced firearms for the Russian military. There he began working on the Fedorov Avtomat, a pioneering automatic rifle designed by Vladimir Grigoryevich Fyodorov. After the Russian Revolution, he received further education at the Moscow Polytechnic Institute, graduating in 1924 to work at the Tula Arsenal. By 1926, he had become a quality control inspector, and by 1927, had been promoted into the Soviet Design and Development Department where he worked directly under Fyodorov. He became one of the leading designers of automatic infantry rifles, which at the time were still in their infancy.

Simonov's first success was the AVS-36, a select fire infantry rifle which he first presented in 1926, earning the interest of the Soviet Armed Forces. It entered service with the Red Army in the 1936, becoming one of the first automatic infantry rifles to be formally adopted by a military. The AVS-36 would see limited service with Soviet forces during the Winter War, up to about 1940 or so, before it was replaced by Tokarev's semi-automatic SVT-40 due to design issues and personal politics. Following the Soviet Union's entry into World War II in June 1941, Simonov and his factory were evacuated to Saratov, where he designed some firearms of his own; a submachine gun which did not enter production, and the PTRS-41, a semi-automatic anti-tank rifle which used the 14.5×114mm round. The PTRS-41 was quickly adopted by the Red Army for use against German Panzer tanks due to a shortage of anti-tank guns early in the war. Its effectiveness soon waned as the Germans reinforced the armour of their tanks, but it remained useful as an anti-materiel rifle and was produced for the remainder of the war.

By 1941, Simonov began development of the SKS, a semi-automatic carbine rifle that utilised a scaled-down version of the PTRS-41's operating mechanism. The Red Army was searching for a semi-automatic rifle to replace its obsolete bolt-action Mosin–Nagant rifles, and took interest in Simonov's prototype which was designated the SKS-41. Development of the SKS was hindered by official insistence on using the powerful 7.62×54mmR round, which was at that point standard amongst Soviet rifles. Simonov's AVS-36 and Tokarev's SVT-40 had suffered from this requirement, and had shown that the rim of the 7.62×54mmR was detrimental to the rapid, reliable function of a semi-automatic rifle. By 1943, Soviet military authorities began to take interest in smaller rounds due to experiments with 7.92×33mm Kurz ammunition captured from the Germans, and data showing that most engagements were taking place at between 100 meters to 300 meters. This led to the adoption of a shorter, less powerful round, the 7.62×39mm M1943 (also known as "7.62 Soviet" or "7.62 short" to differentiate it from several other rounds in 7.62 mm calibre). Field trials of the new SKS rifle proved the weapon and, in 1944, a pre-production run of the SKS were used by the 1st Byelorussian Front for battlefield trials. After some tweaking, it was officially adopted and designated the 7.62 Samozaryadnyi Karabin Sistemy Simonova Obrazets 1945 g. ("7.62 Self-loading Carbine System Simonov model year 1945") or SKS-45, and chosen as the ideal replacement for the SVT-40. The SKS was formally adopted by the Soviet Army in 1949.

Simonov died on 6 May 1985 in Moscow at the age of 91, and was buried at the Kuntsevo Cemetery.

== Weapons designed ==
- AG-043
- AKS-53
- AKS-91
- AO-63 assault rifle
- AVS-36
- PTRS-41
- SKS
- SVS-38

== Awards and honors ==
- Hero of Socialist Labour (20 October 1954)
- Three Orders of Lenin (18 January 1942, 20 October 1954, 4 October 1984)
- Order of the October Revolution (4 October 1974)
- Order of Kutuzov, 2nd class (16 September 1945)
- Order of the Patriotic War, 1st class (18 November 1944)
- Two Orders of the Red Banner of Labour (5 June 1944, 5 October 1979)
- Order of the Red Star (8 June 1939)
- Honoured Inventor of the RSFSR (1964)
- Two Stalin Prizes, 1st class (10 April 1942, for the creation of an anti-tank weapon; 1949, for the creation of the SKS rifle)
- Jubilee Medal "In Commemoration of the 100th Anniversary of the Birth of Vladimir Ilyich Lenin"
- Medal "For the Defence of Moscow"
- Medal "For Valiant Labour in the Great Patriotic War 1941–1945"
- Medal "For the Victory over Germany in the Great Patriotic War 1941–1945"
- Medal "Veteran of Labour"
