= Assault rifle =

Select-fire self-loading rifle that fires an intermediate-power cartridge

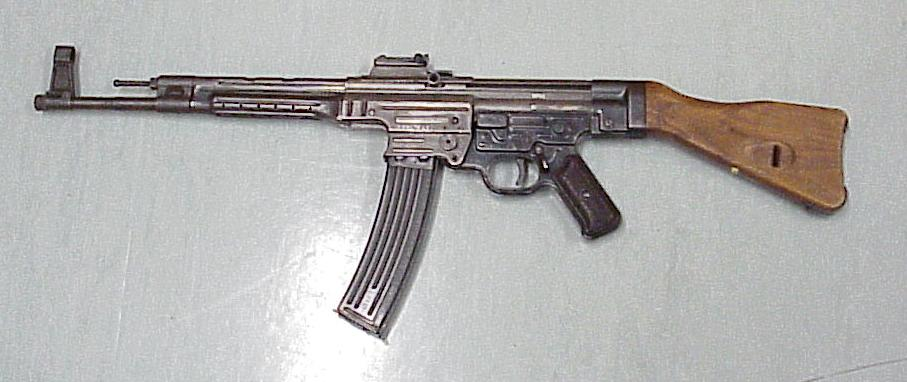
The first successfully deployed assault rifle, the StG 44 was adopted by the German army in 1944. It fires the 7.92×33mm Kurz round.

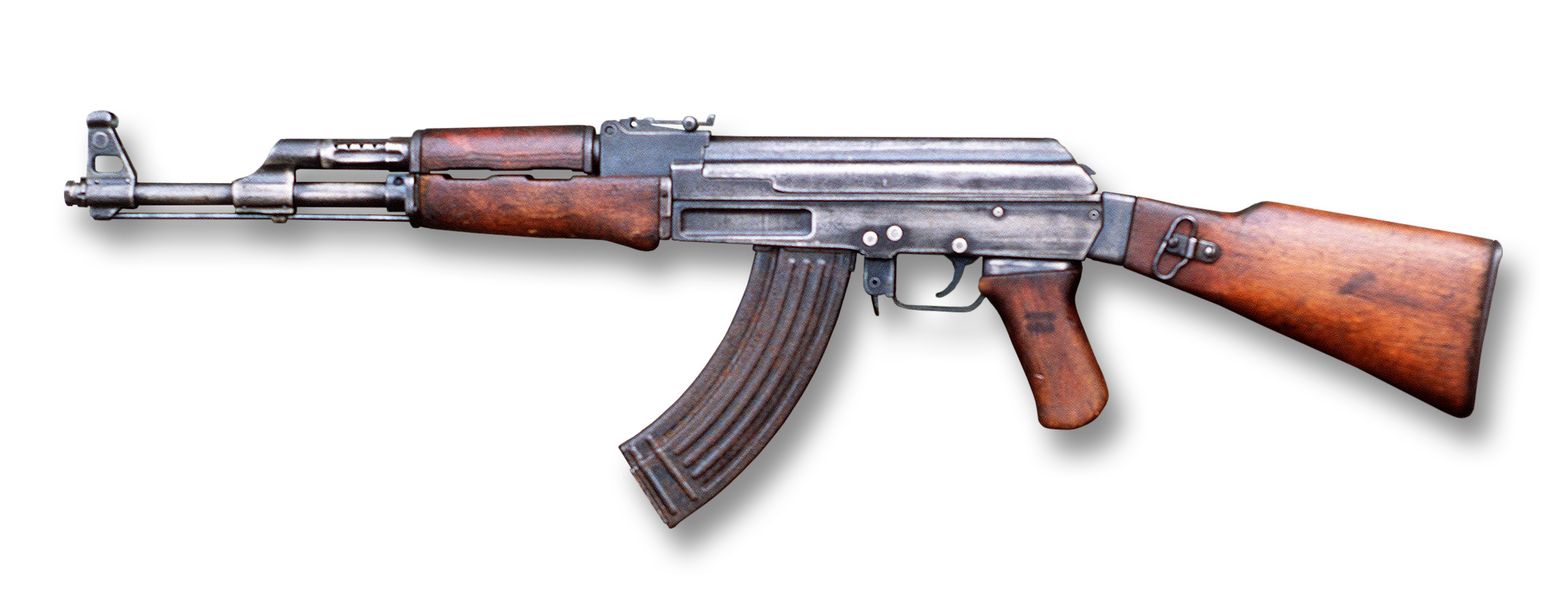
Currently the most used assault rifle in the world along with its variants, the AKM and the AK-74, the AK-47 was first adopted in 1949 by the Soviet Army. It fires the 7.62×39mm cartridge.

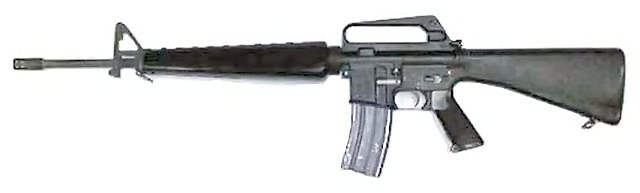
The M16 was first introduced into service in 1964 with the U.S. military, It fires the 5.56×45mm NATO cartridge and is the most produced assault rifle in its caliber.

An assault rifle is a select fire rifle that uses an intermediate-rifle cartridge and a detachable magazine. Assault rifles were first put into mass production and accepted into widespread service during World War II (1939-1945). The first assault rifle to see major usage was the German StG 44, a development of the earlier Mkb 42. While in the immediate aftermath of World War II, the NATO countries were equipped with battle rifles, the development of the M16 rifle during the Vietnam War prompted the adoption of assault rifles by the rest of NATO. By the end of the 20th century, assault rifles had become the standard weapon in most of the world's armies, replacing full-powered rifles and submachine guns in most roles. The two most successful modern assault rifles are the AK-47 and the M16 designs and their derivatives.

== Origin of term ==
The term assault rifle is generally attributed to Adolf Hitler, who used the German word Sturmgewehr (which translates to "assault rifle") as the new name for the MP 43 (Maschinenpistole), subsequently known as the Sturmgewehr 44. Allied propaganda suggested that the name was chosen for propaganda purposes, but the main purpose was to differentiate the Sturmgewehr from German submachine guns such as the MP 40.

It has been suggested, however, that the Heereswaffenamt was responsible for the name Sturmgewehr, and Hitler had no input besides signing the production order. Furthermore, Hitler was initially opposed to the idea of a new infantry rifle, as Germany lacked the industrial capacity to replace the 12,000,000 Karabiner 98k rifles already in service, only changing his mind once he saw it first-hand.

The StG 44 is generally considered the first selective fire military rifle to popularize the assault rifle concept. Today, the term assault rifle is used to define firearms sharing the same basic characteristics as the StG 44.

== Definition ==
The U.S. Army defines assault rifles as "short, compact, selective-fire weapons that fire a cartridge intermediate in power between submachine gun and rifle cartridges." In this strict definition, a firearm must have at least the following characteristics to be considered an assault rifle:

- It must be capable of selective fire.
- It must have an intermediate-power cartridge: more power than a pistol but less than a standard rifle or battle rifle; examples of intermediate cartridges are the 7.92×33mm Kurz, the 7.62×39mm and 5.56×45mm NATO.
- Its ammunition must be supplied from a detachable box magazine.
- It must have an effective range of at least 300 metres (330 yards).

Rifles that meet most of these criteria, but not all, are not assault rifles according to the U.S. Army's definition. For example:

- Select-fire rifles such as the FN FAL, M14, and H&K G3 main battle rifles are not assault rifles; they fire full-powered rifle cartridges.
- Semi-automatic-only rifles like the Colt AR-15 are not assault rifles; they do not have select-fire capabilities.
- Semi-automatic-only rifles with fixed magazines like the SKS are not assault rifles; they do not have detachable box magazines and are not capable of automatic fire.

=== Distinction from assault weapons ===
In the United States, selective-fire rifles are legally defined as "machine guns", and civilian ownership of those has been tightly regulated since 1934 under the National Firearms Act and since 1986 under the Firearm Owners Protection Act. However, the term "assault rifle" is often conflated with "assault weapon", a U.S. legal category with varying definitions which includes many semi-automatic weapons. This use has been described as incorrect and a misapplication of the term.

== History ==
=== WWI designs ===
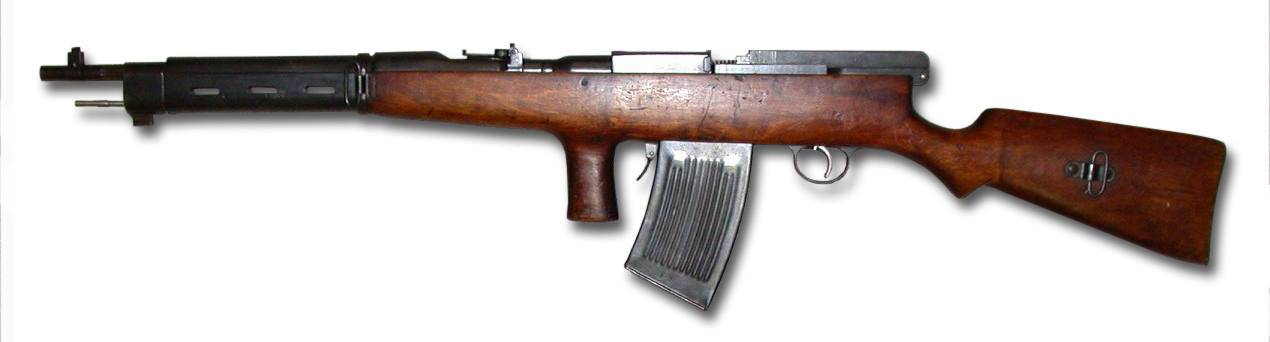
Fedorov Avtomat

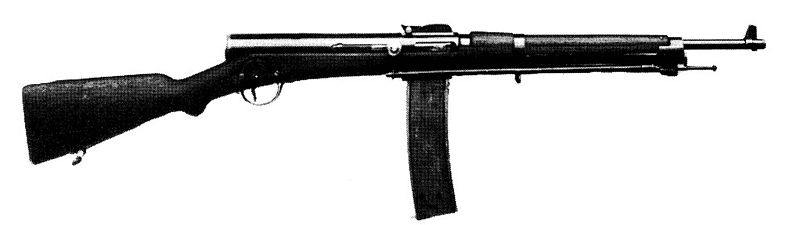
Ribeyrolles 1918 automatic carbine

The Fedorov Avtomat (also anglicized as Federov, Russian: Автома́т Фёдорова, romanized: Avtomát Fyódorova, IPA: [ɐftɐˈmat ˈfʲɵdərəvə], lit. 'Fyodorov's automatic rifle') is a select-fire infantry rifle and also one of the world's first operational automatic rifles, designed by Vladimir Grigoryevich Fyodorov in 1915 and produced in the Russian Empire and later in the Russian Soviet Federative Socialist Republic. A total of 3,200 Fedorov rifles were manufactured between 1915 and 1924 in the city of Kovrov; the vast majority of them were made after 1920. The weapon saw limited combat in World War I, but was used more substantially in the Russian Civil War and in the Winter War. Some consider it to be an "early predecessor" or "ancestor" of the modern assault rifle.

=== Sturmgewehr 44 ===
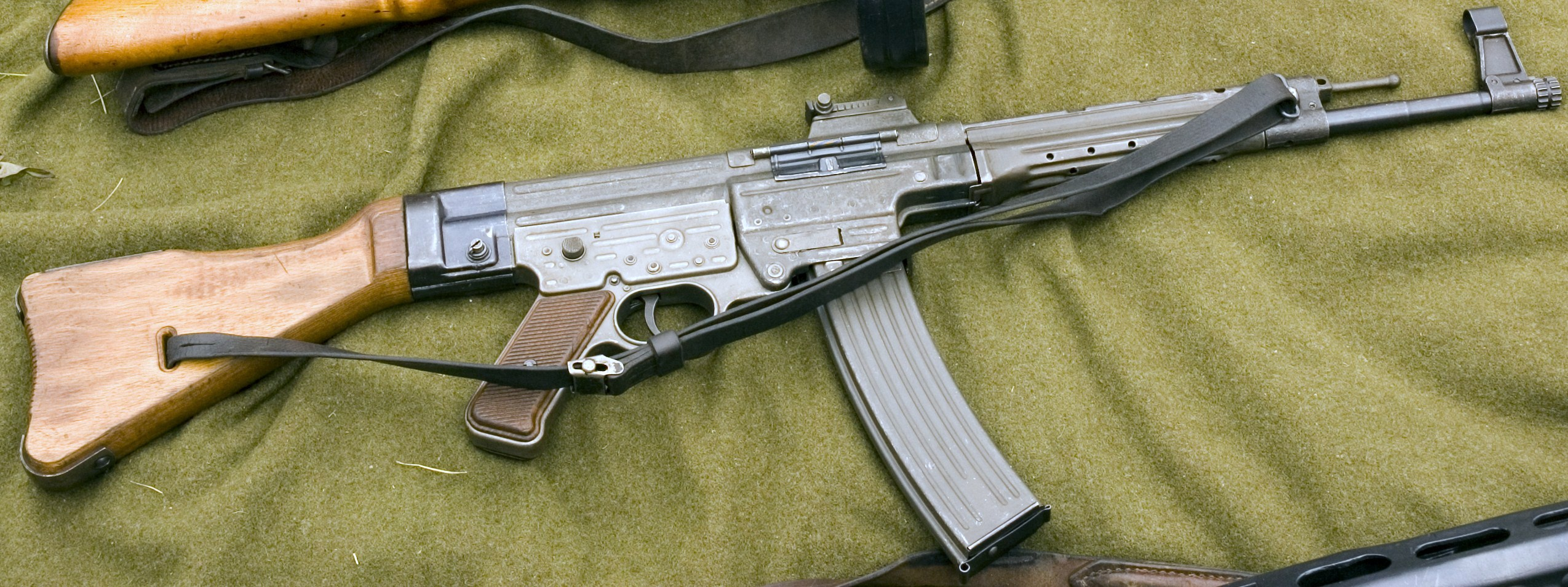
Sturmgewehr 44

The Germans were the first to successfully implement the assault rifle concept during World War II, based upon research that showed that most firefights happen within 400 metres (1,300 ft) and that contemporary rifles were overpowered for most small arms combat. They would soon develop a select-fire intermediate powered rifle combining the firepower of a submachine gun with the range and accuracy of a rifle.

The result was the Sturmgewehr 44, an improvement of the earlier Maschinenkarabiner 42(H), and approximately half a million Sturmgewehrs were produced by the war's end. It fired a new and revolutionary intermediate powered cartridge, the 7.92×33mm Kurz. This new cartridge was developed by shortening the standard 7.92×57mm Mauser round and giving it a lighter 125-grain bullet, which limited range but allowed for more controllable automatic fire. A smaller, lighter cartridge also allowed soldiers to carry more ammunition "to support the higher consumption rate of automatic fire".

The Sturmgewehr 44 features an inexpensive, easy-to-make, stamped steel design and a 30-round detachable box magazine. This weapon was the prototype of all successful automatic rifles. Characteristically (and unlike previous rifles) it had a straight stock with the barrel under the gas cylinder to reduce the turning moment of recoil of the rifle in the shoulder and thus help reduce the tendency of shots to climb in automatic fire. The barrel and overall length were shorter than a traditional rifle and it had a pistol grip to hold the weapon more securely in automatic fire. "The principle of this weapon—the reduction of muzzle impulse to get usable automatic fire within the actual ranges of combat—was probably the most important advance in small arms since the invention of smokeless powder."

=== AK-47 ===
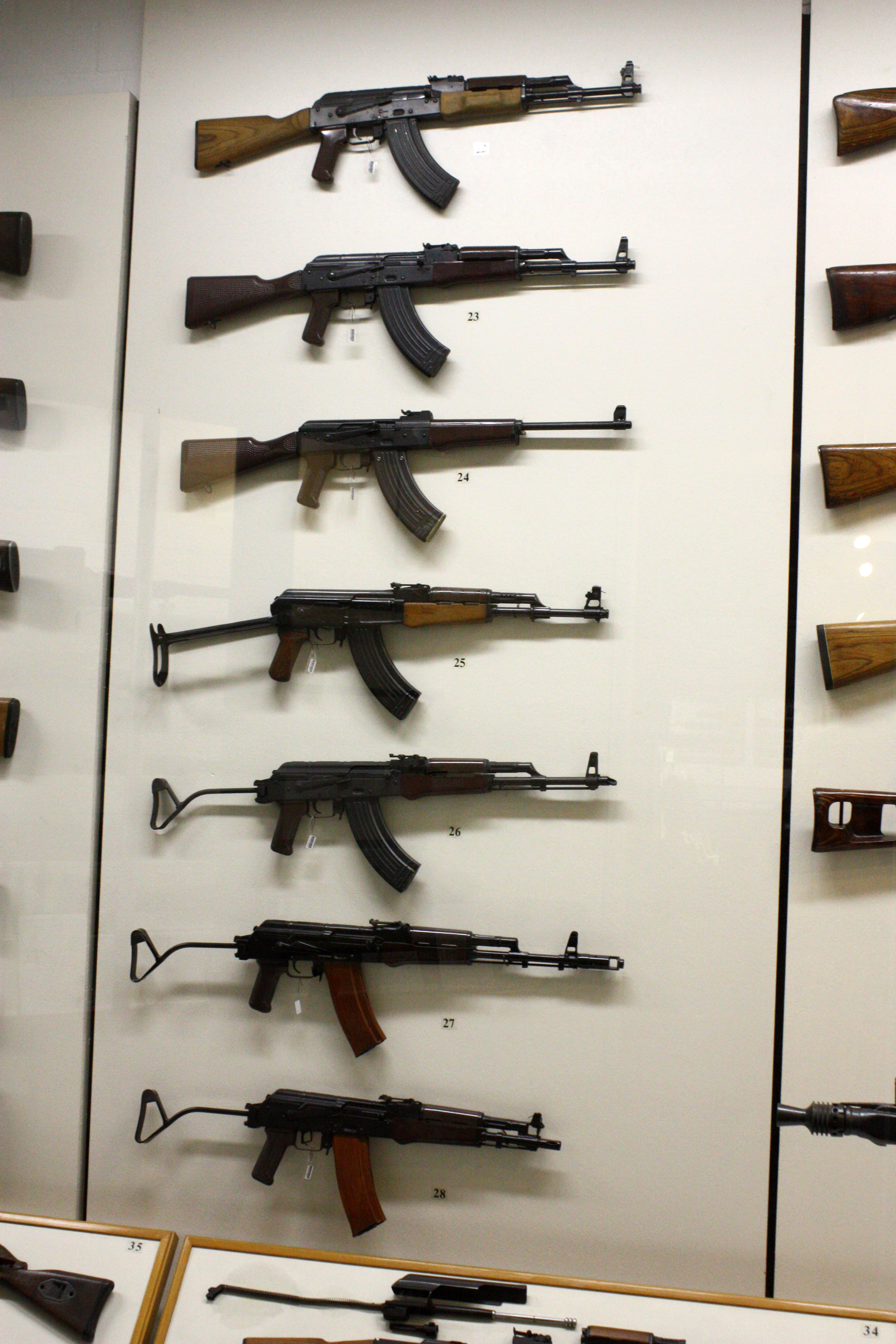
Variants of AK

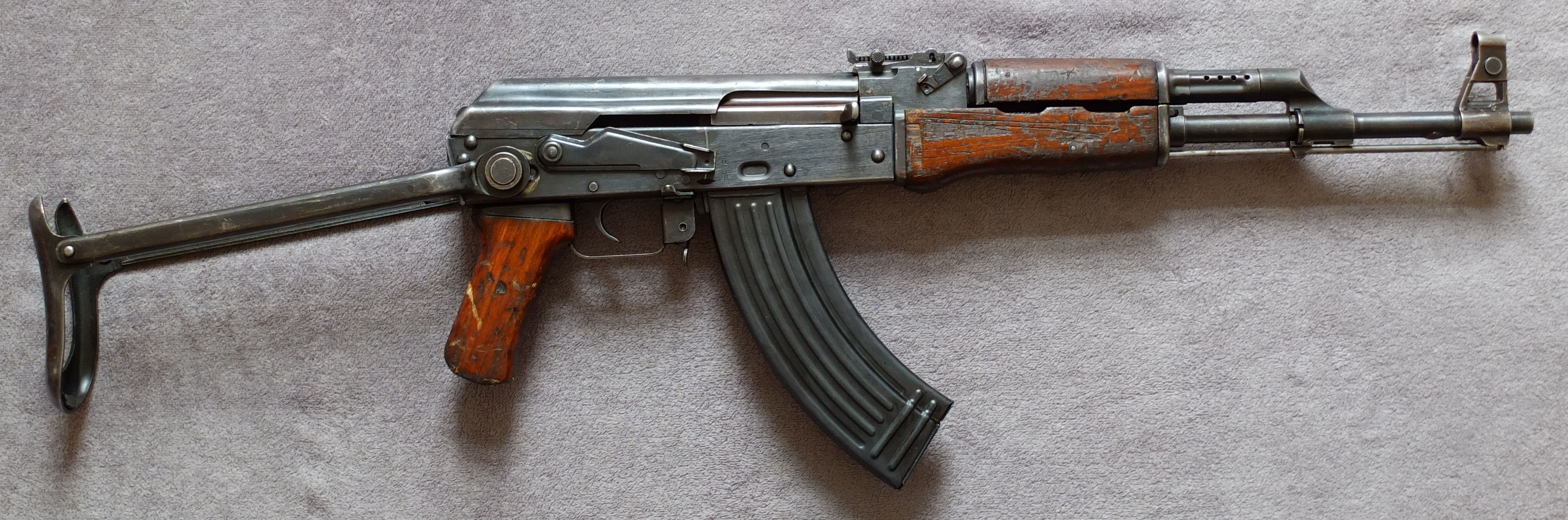
A Type 56 assault rifle

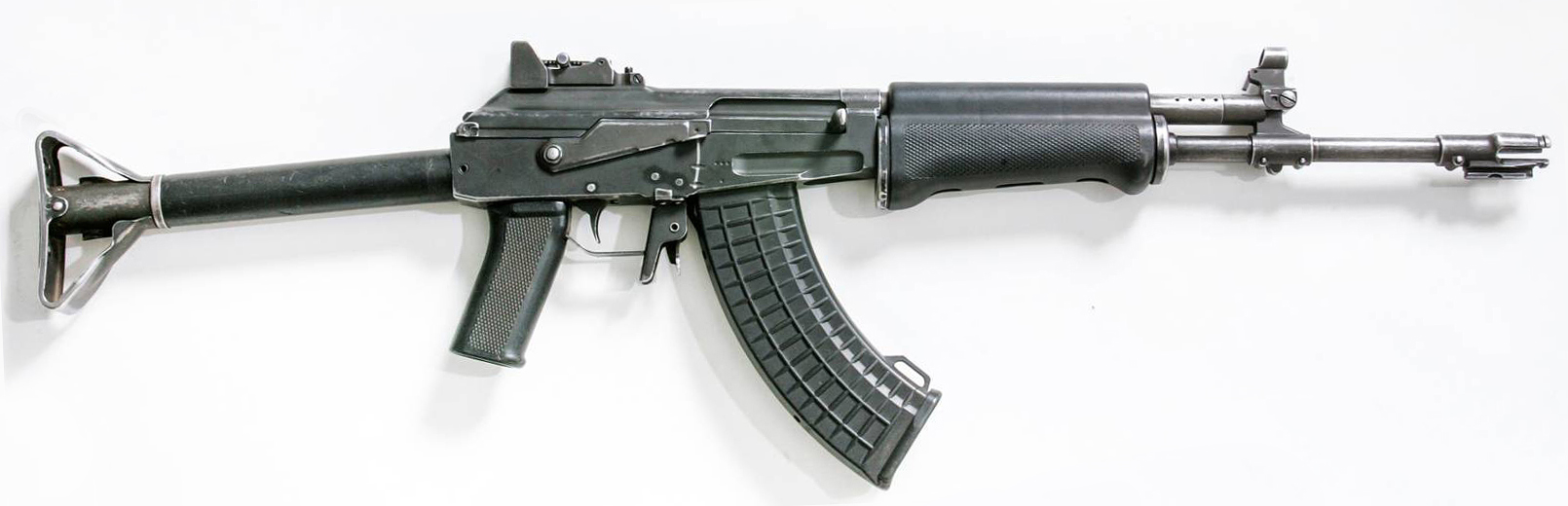
A Finnish RK 62, based on the Polish licensed version of AK-47

Like the Germans, the Soviets were influenced by experience showing that most combat engagements occur within 400 metres (1,300 ft) and that their soldiers were consistently outgunned by heavily armed German troops, especially those armed with Sturmgewehr 44 assault rifles. On July 15, 1943, a Sturmgewehr was demonstrated before the People's Commissariat of Arms of the USSR. The Soviets were so impressed with the Sturmgewehr that they immediately set about developing an intermediate caliber automatic rifle of their own to replace the outdated Mosin–Nagant bolt-action rifles and pistol-caliber PPSh-41 and PPS-43 submachine guns that armed most of the Red Army.

The Soviets soon developed the 7.62×39mm M43 cartridge, which was first used in the semi-automatic SKS carbine and the RPD light machine gun. Hugo Schmeisser, the designer of the Sturmgewehr, was captured after World War II and likely helped develop the AK-47 assault rifle, which would quickly replace the SKS and Mosin in Soviet service. The AK-47 was finalized, adopted and entered widespread service in the Soviet army in the early 1950s. Its firepower, ease of use, low production costs, and reliability were perfectly suited for the Red Army's new mobile warfare doctrines. In the 1960s, the Soviets introduced the RPK light machine gun, itself an AK-47 type weapon with a bipod, a stronger receiver, and a longer, heavier barrel that would eventually replace the RPD light machine gun.

The AK-47 was widely supplied or sold to nations allied with the USSR, and the blueprints were shared with several friendly nations (the People's Republic of China standing out among these with the Type 56). As a result, more AK-type weapons have been produced than all other assault rifles combined. As of 2004, "of the estimated 500 million firearms worldwide, approximately 100 million belong to the Kalashnikov family, three-quarters of which are AK-47s."

=== Post-StG battle rifles ===
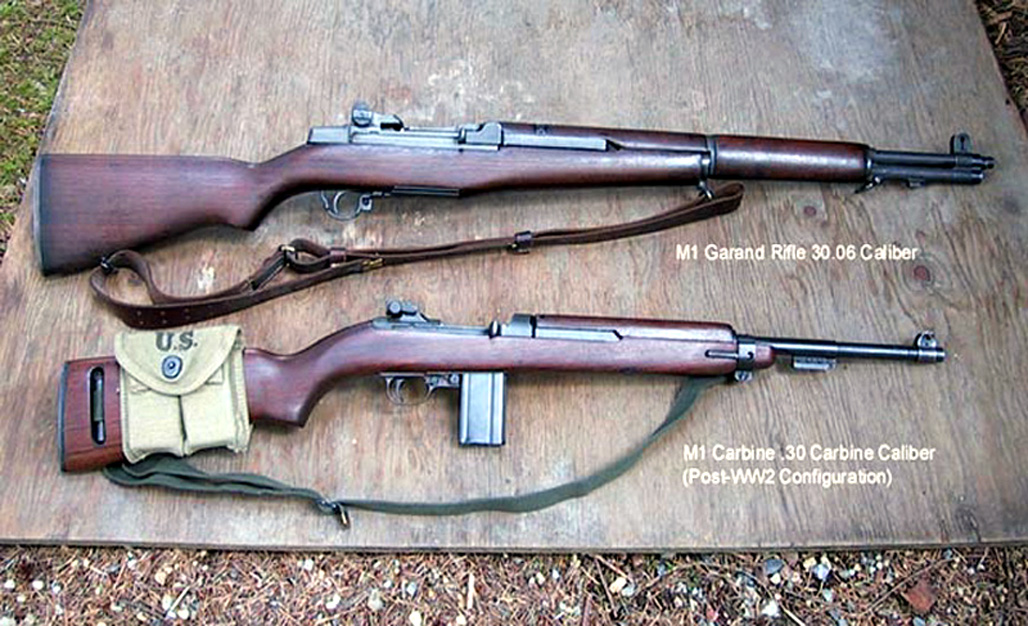
The M1 Garand (top) and M1 Carbine

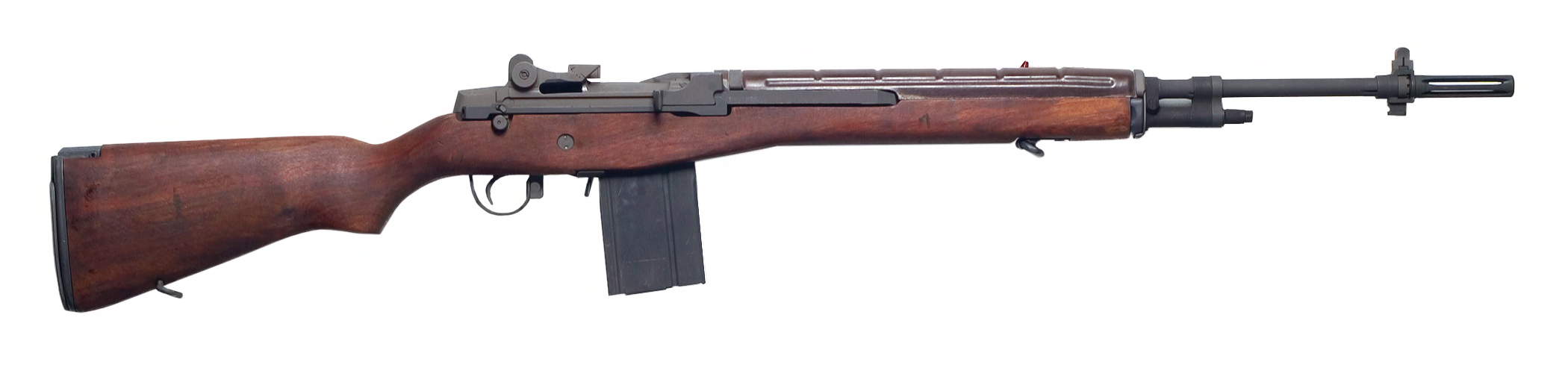
American M14

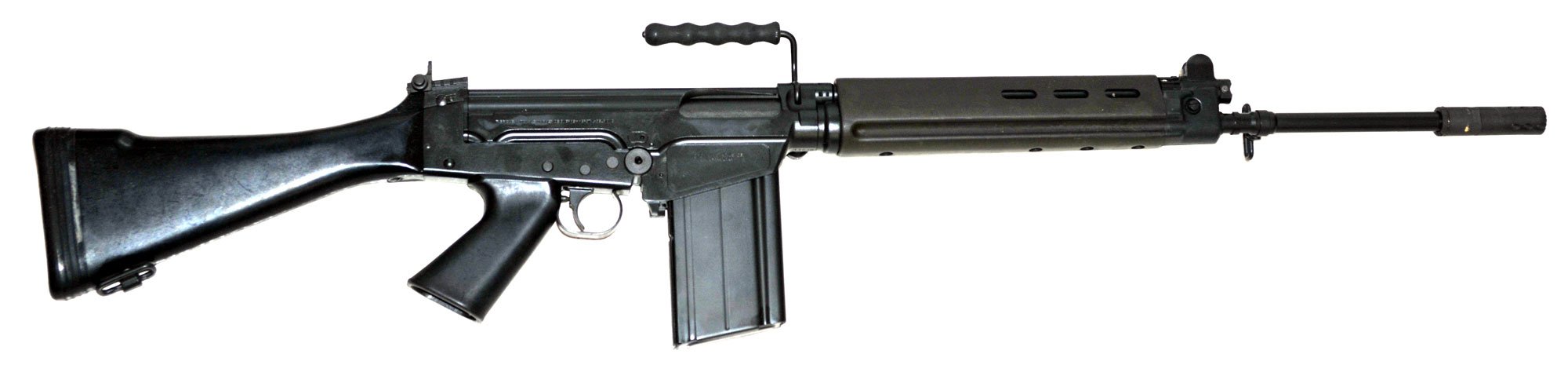
Belgian FN FAL

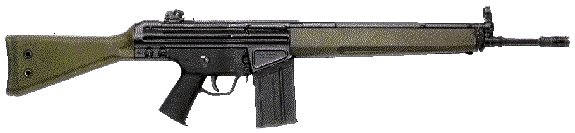
West German Heckler & Koch G3

The U.S. Army was influenced by combat experience with semi-automatic weapons such as the M1 Garand and M1 Carbine, which enjoyed a significant advantage over enemies armed primarily with bolt-action rifles. Although U.S. Army studies of World War II combat accounts had very similar results to that of the Germans and Soviets, the U.S. Army failed to recognize the importance of the assault rifle concept, and instead maintained its traditional views and preference for high-powered semi-automatic rifles. At the time, the U.S. Army believed that the Sturmgewehr 44 was "intended in a general way to serve the same purpose as the U.S. carbine" and was in many ways inferior to the M1 carbine, and was of "little importance".

After World War II, the United States military started looking for a single automatic rifle to replace the M1 Garand, M1/M2 Carbines, M1918 Browning Automatic Rifle, M3 "Grease Gun" and Thompson submachine gun. Early experiments with select-fire versions of the M1 Garand proved disappointing. During the Korean War, the select-fire M2 Carbine largely replaced the submachine gun in U.S. service and became the most widely used Carbine variant. Combat experience suggested that the .30 Carbine round was under-powered. American weapons designers reached the same conclusion as the German and Soviet ones: an intermediate round was necessary, and recommended a small-caliber, high-velocity cartridge.

Senior American commanders had faced fanatical enemies and experienced major logistical problems during World War II and the Korean War, and insisted that a single powerful .30 caliber cartridge be developed, that could be used by the new automatic rifle, and also by the new general-purpose machine gun (GPMG) in concurrent development. This culminated in the development of the 7.62×51mm NATO cartridge and the M14 rifle which was basically an improved select-fire M1 Garand with a 20-round magazine. The U.S. also adopted the M60 GPMG, which replaced the M1919 Browning machine gun in major combat roles. Its NATO partners adopted the FN FAL and Heckler & Koch G3 rifles, as well as the FN MAG and Rheinmetall MG3 GPMGs.

The FN FAL is a 7.62×51mm, selective fire, automatic rifle produced by the Belgian armaments manufacturer Fabrique Nationale de Herstal (FN). During the Cold War it was adopted by many North Atlantic Treaty Organization (NATO) countries, most notably with the British Commonwealth as the semi-automatic L1A1. It is one of the most widely used rifles in history, having been used by more than 90 countries. The FAL was predominantly chambered for the 7.62mm NATO round, and because of its prevalence and widespread use among the armed forces of many western nations during the Cold War, it was nicknamed "The right arm of the Free World".

The Heckler & Koch G3 is a 7.62×51mm, selective fire, automatic rifle produced by the German armament manufacturer Heckler & Koch GmbH (H&K) in collaboration with the Spanish state-owned design and development agency CETME (Centro de Estudios Técnicos de Materiales Especiales). The rifle proved successful in the export market, being adopted by the armed forces of over 60 countries. After World War II, German technicians involved in developing the Sturmgewehr 45, continued their research in France at CEAM. The StG 45 mechanism was modified by Ludwig Vorgrimler and Theodor Löffler at the Mulhouse facility between 1946 and 1949. Vorgrimler later went to work at CETME in Spain and developed the line of CETME automatic rifles based on his improved StG 45 design. Germany eventually purchased the license for the CETME design and manufactured the Heckler & Koch G3 as well as an entire line of weapons built on the same system, one of the most famous being the MP5 SMG.

=== M16 ===
The first confrontations between the AK-47 and the M14 ("assault rifle" vs "battle rifle") came in the early part of the Vietnam War. Battlefield reports indicated that the M14 was uncontrollable in full-auto and that soldiers could not carry enough ammunition to maintain fire superiority over the AK-47. And, while the M2 Carbine offered a high rate of fire, it was under-powered and ultimately outclassed by the AK-47. A replacement was needed: A medium between the traditional preference for high-powered rifles such as the M14, and the lightweight firepower of the M2 Carbine.

As a result, the Army was forced to reconsider a 1957 request by General Willard G. Wyman, commander of the U.S. Continental Army Command (CONARC) to develop a .223 caliber (5.56 mm) select-fire rifle weighing 2.7 kg (6 lb) when loaded with a 20-round magazine. The 5.56 mm round had to penetrate a standard U.S. helmet at 460 metres (500 yd) and retain a velocity in excess of the speed of sound, while matching or exceeding the wounding ability of the .30 Carbine cartridge.

This request ultimately resulted in the development of a scaled-down version of the ArmaLite AR-10, called the ArmaLite AR-15 rifle. However, despite overwhelming evidence that the AR-15 could bring more firepower to bear than the M14, the Army opposed the adoption of the new rifle. In January 1963, Secretary of Defense Robert McNamara concluded that the AR-15 was the superior weapon system and ordered a halt to M14 production. At the time, the AR-15 was the only rifle available that could fulfill the requirement of a universal infantry weapon for issue to all services.

After modifications (most notably, the charging handle was re-located from under the carrying handle like it was on AR-10 to the rear of the receiver), the newly redesigned rifle was subsequently adopted as the M16 Rifle. "(The M16) was much lighter compared to the M14 it replaced, ultimately allowing soldiers to carry more ammunition. The air-cooled, gas-operated, magazine-fed assault rifle was made of steel, aluminum alloy and composite plastics, truly cutting-edge for the time. Designed with full and semi-automatic capabilities, the weapon initially did not respond well to wet and dirty conditions, sometimes even jamming in combat. After a few minor modifications, the weapon gained in popularity among troops on the battlefield."

Despite its early failures, the M16 proved to be a revolutionary design and stands as the longest continuously serving rifle in American military history. It has been adopted by many U.S. allies and the 5.56×45mm NATO cartridge has become not only the NATO standard but "the standard assault-rifle cartridge in much of the world". It also led to the development of small-caliber high-velocity service rifles by every major army in the world, including the USSR and People's Republic of China. Today, many small arms experts consider the M16 the standard by which all other assault rifles are judged.

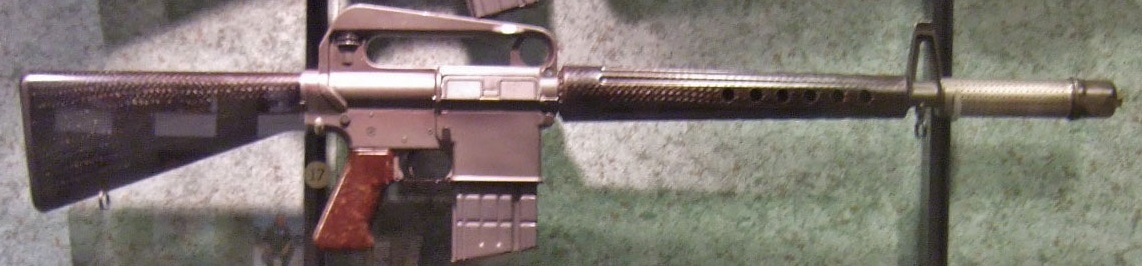
ArmaLite AR-10

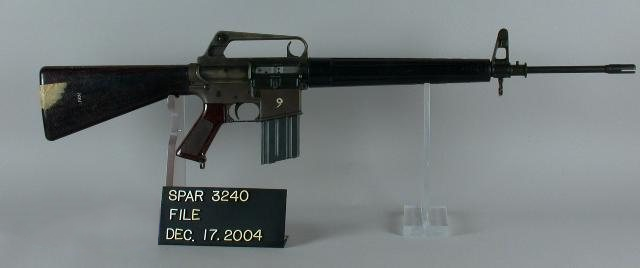
ArmaLite AR-15

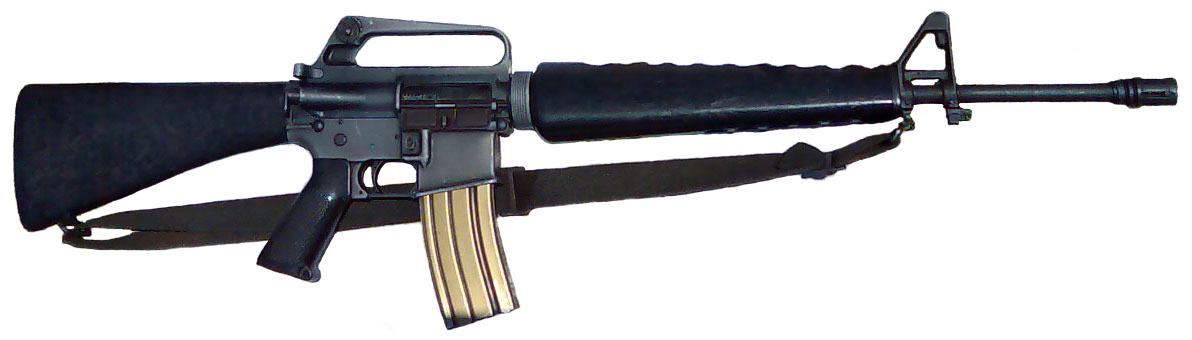
M16A1 rifle

=== SKS and derivatives ===
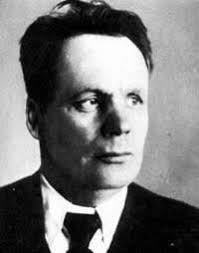
Sergei Simonov

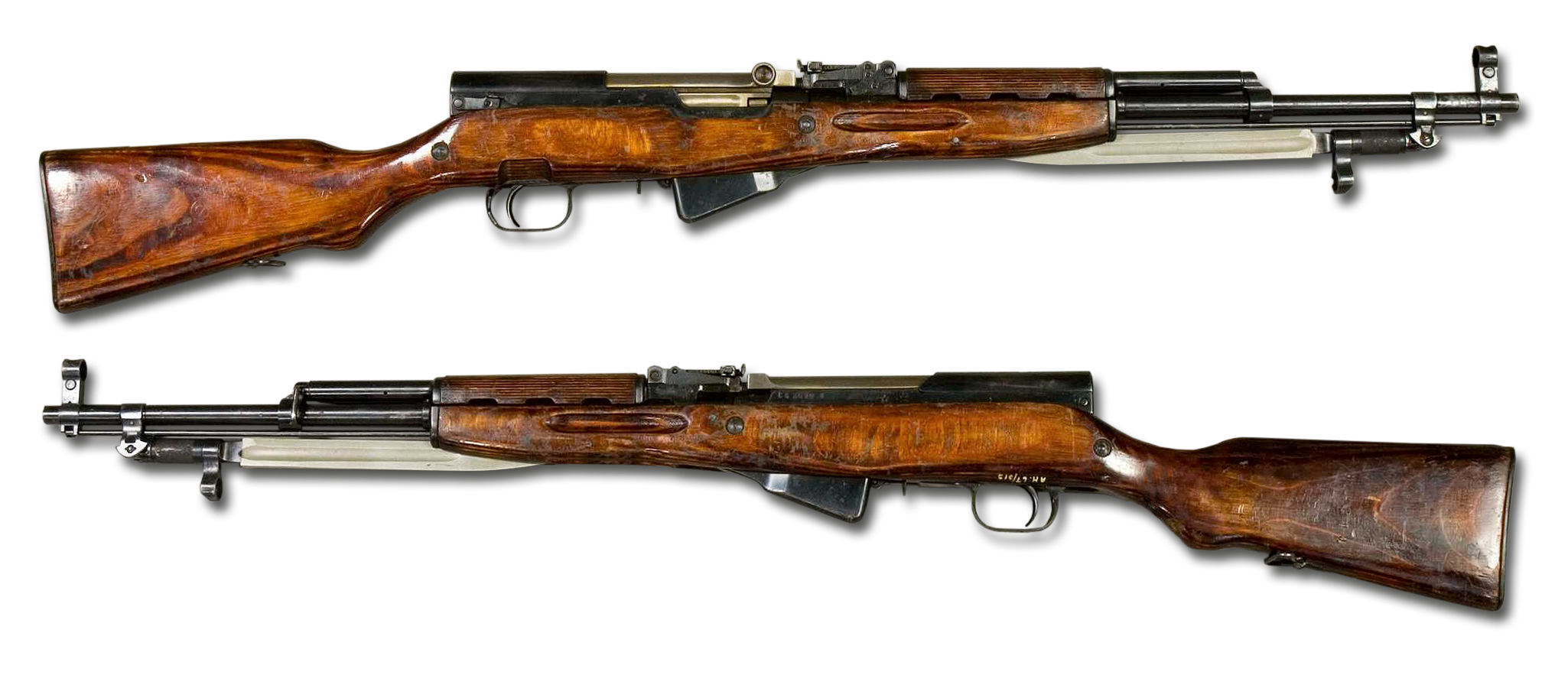
SKS

During World War II, the Soviet Union primarily used the Mosin–Nagant rifle but began exploring modern alternatives like the AVS-36 and SVT-40. In 1943, Soviet engineers developed the 7.62×39mm M43 cartridge, inspired by German designs, leading to the creation of the SKS carbine by Sergei Simonov. The carbine was based on the operating system of Simonov's PTRS-41. Officially adopted as the SKS-45 after the war, it briefly replaced the Mosin–Nagant before being overtaken by the AK-47. In 1955, the Soviets shared SKS and AK-47 technology with China, resulting in the Type 56 carbine, which became the People's Liberation Army's standard rifle. To improve on the SKS, China developed the select-fire Type 63 assault rifle, but it suffered from poor quality control, with nearly 700 unauthorized design changes that compromised performance. Production ended in 1978, and the PLA reverted to the more reliable Type 56, though some Type 63s were used briefly in the 1979 Sino-Vietnamese War.

Prompted by the shortcomings of the Type 56 weapons revealed during the 1979 Sino-Vietnamese War, the Type 81 assault rifle was developed by blending features from the AK, SKS, SVD, and Type 63 rifles, such as its unique gas regulator. Designed for improved accuracy, durability, and full-auto control, it retained the AK's layout but added a short-stroke gas system, recoil-reducing enhancements, and a spigot-style grenade launcher. Entering PLA service in 1981, it replaced the Type 56 series and saw action in the later stages of the Sino-Vietnamese conflict. Though largely replaced by newer rifles like the QBZ-95 and QBZ-03, it remains in reserve use and was exported, with Bangladesh using it as the BD-08 and Myanmar's Kachin Independence Army producing a polymer-based variant called the M23.

The Type 81 rifle served as the foundation for the Type 87, which was developed as a test platform for China's new 5.8×42mm DBP87 ammunition, used in the QBZ-03 and QBZ-95 rifles. Featuring plastic furniture and a folding stock, the Type 87 never entered mass production and was soon succeeded by the Type 87A, a prototype refined between 1987 and 1989 for the "Project 8910" parade. The Type 87A introduced polymer components and saw limited use, mainly with PLA special forces. The design lineage continued with the QBZ-03, finalized in 2003, which retained the Type 81's gas system but offered improvements such as a folding stock and higher rate of fire. It was developed partly in response to issues with the QBZ-95.

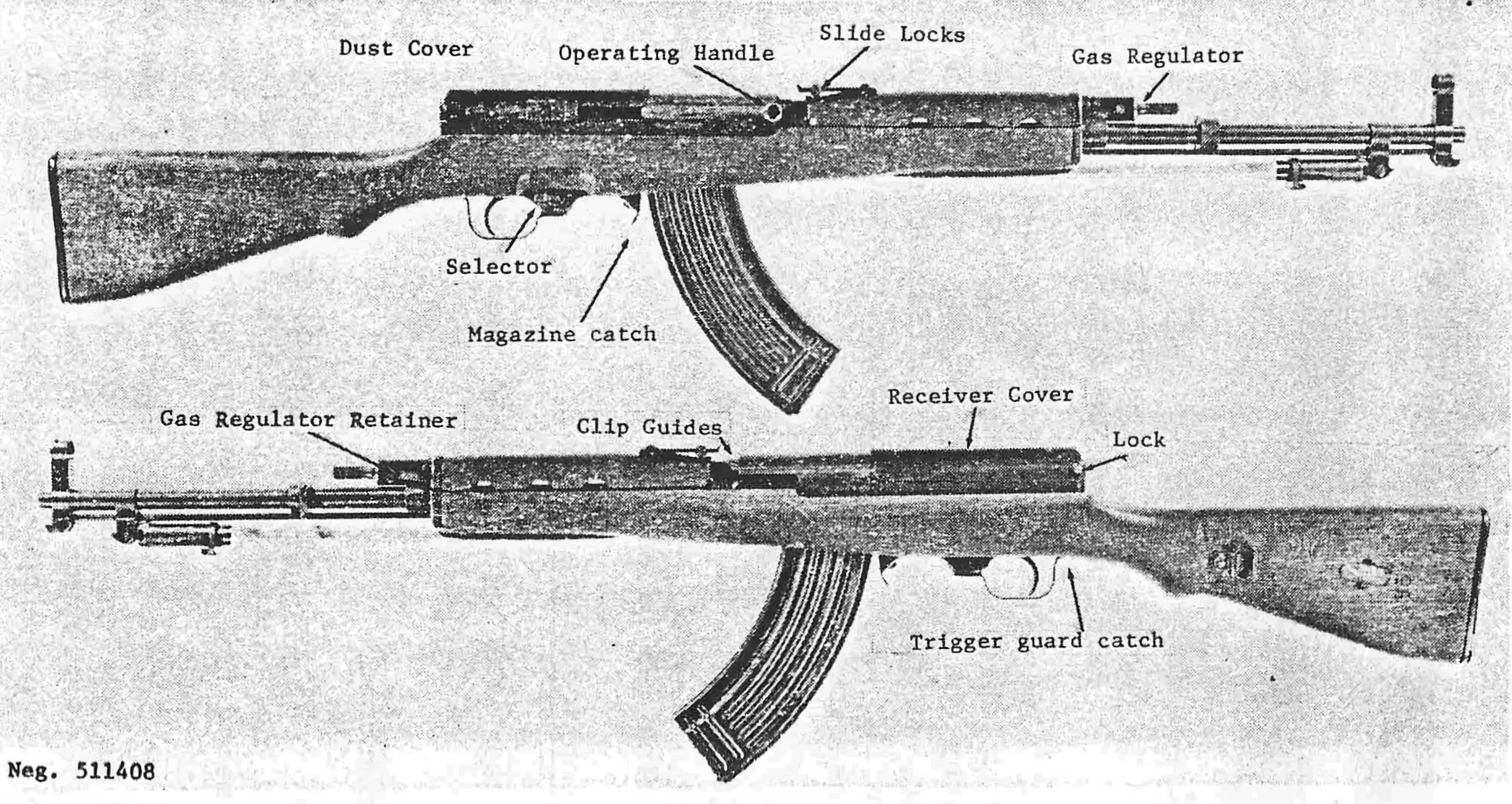
Type 63 assault rifle

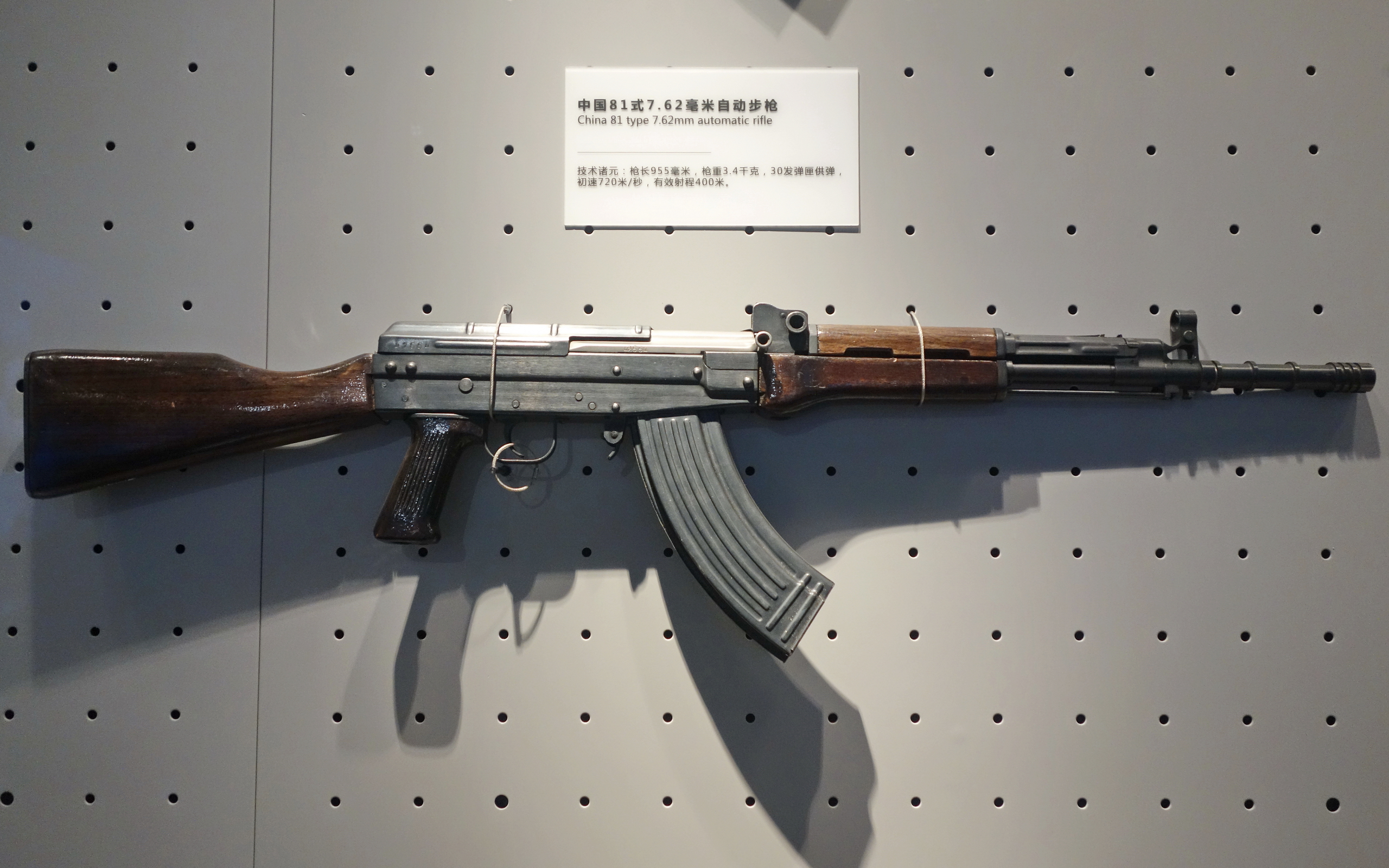
Type 81 assault rifle

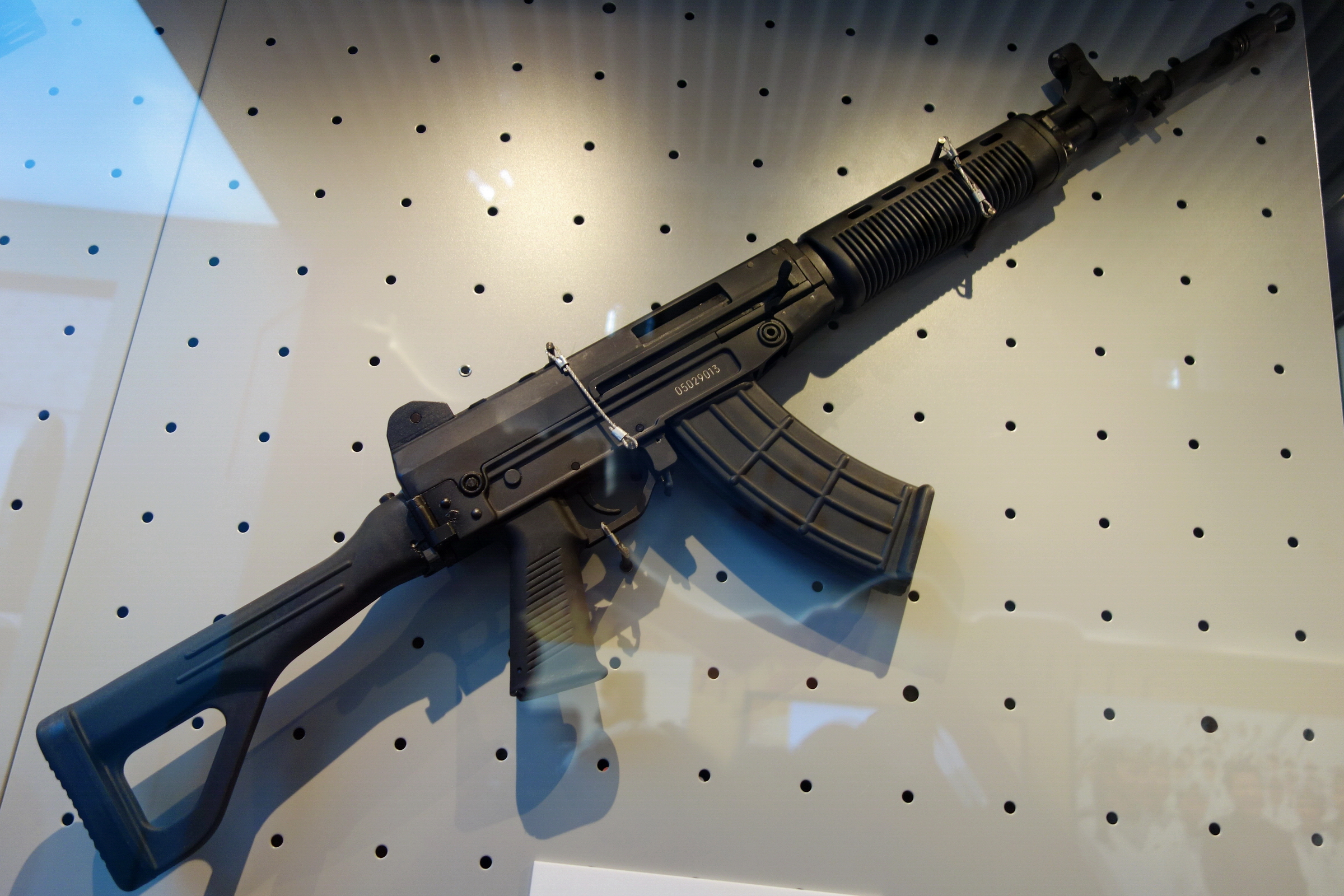
QBZ-03

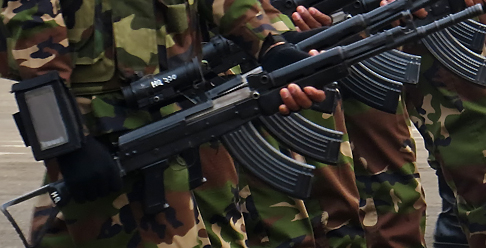
BD-08 assault rifle

=== HK33 ===
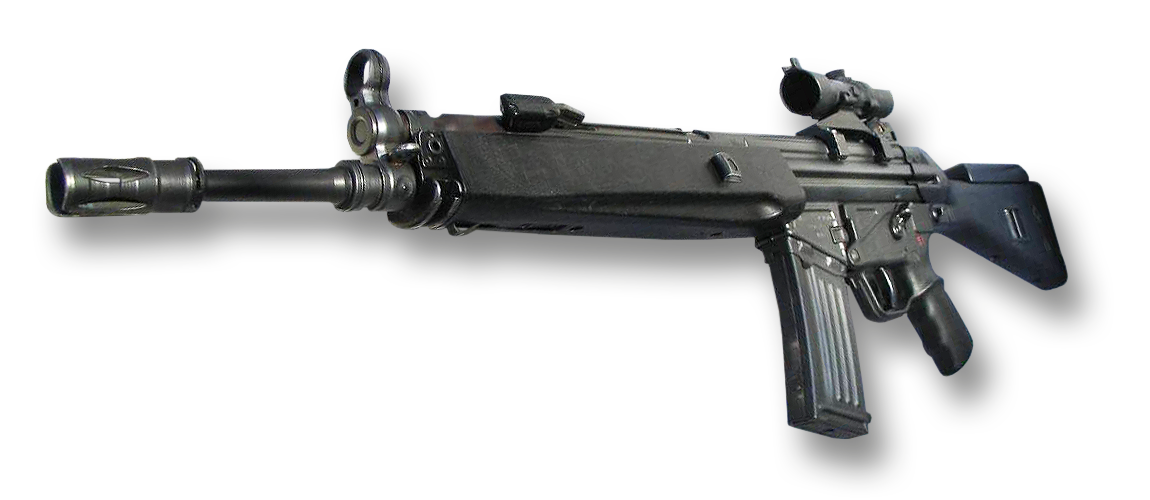
HK33A2

During the 1960s other countries would follow the Americans' lead and begin to develop 5.56×45mm assault rifles, most notably Germany with the Heckler & Koch HK33. The HK33 was essentially a smaller 5.56mm version of the 7.62×51mm Heckler & Koch G3 rifle. As one of the first 5.56mm assault rifles on the market, it would go on to become one of the most widely distributed assault rifles. The HK33 featured a modular design with a wide range of accessories (telescoping butt-stocks, optics, bi-pods, etc.) that could be easily removed and arranged in a variety of configurations.

=== 5.56mm NATO ===
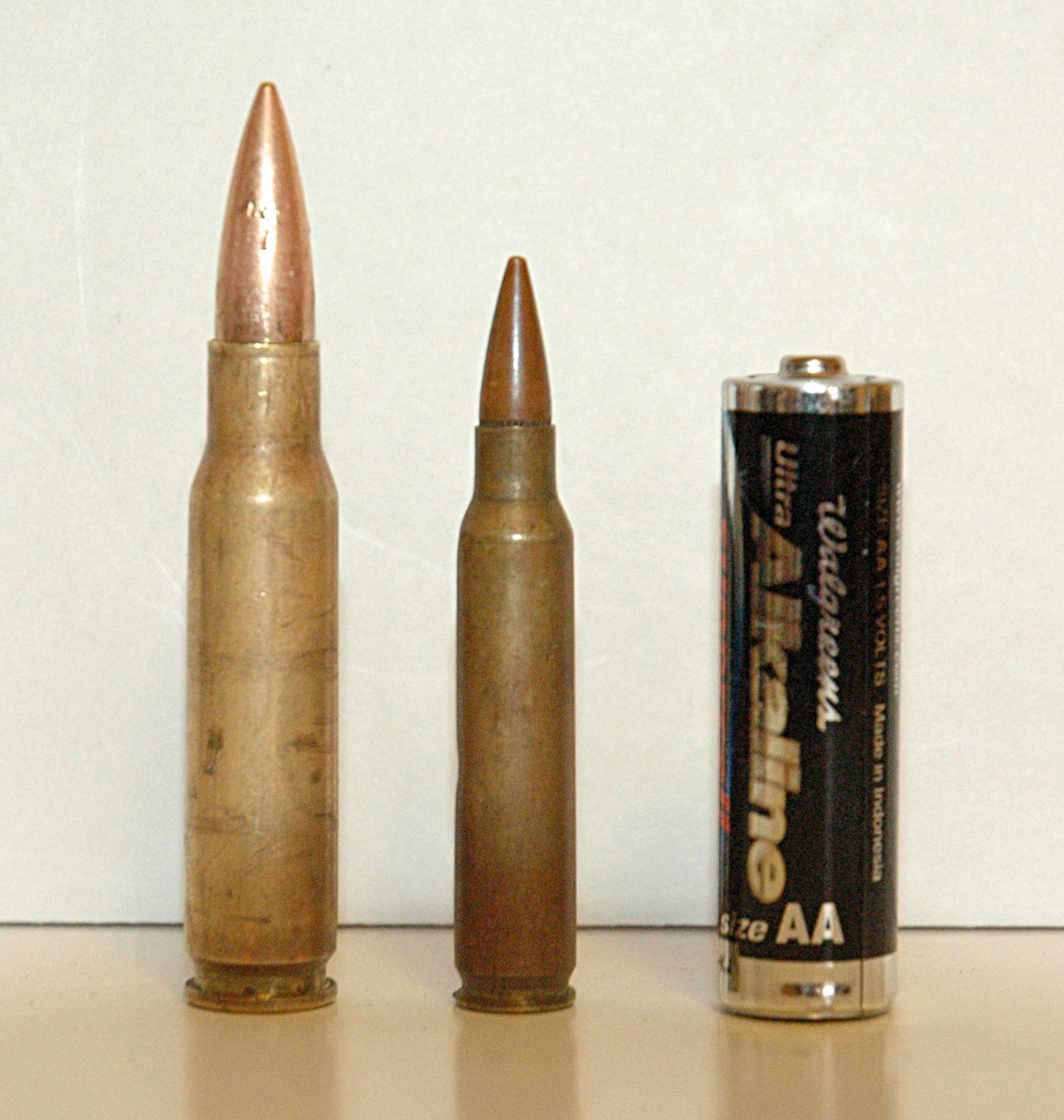
The 7.62×51mm NATO and 5.56×45mm NATO cartridges compared to an AA battery.

The adoption of the M16, the H&K33, and the 5.56×45mm cartridge inspired an international trend towards relatively small-sized, lightweight, high-velocity military service cartridges that allow a soldier to carry more ammunition for the same weight compared to the larger and heavier 7.62×51mm NATO cartridge. The 5.56mm cartridge is also much easier to shoot. In 1961 marksmanship testing, the U.S. Army found that 43% of AR-15 shooters achieved Expert, while only 22% of M-14 rifle shooters did so. Also, a lower recoil impulse, allows for more controllable automatic weapons fire.

In March 1970, the U.S. recommended that all NATO forces adopt the 5.56×45mm cartridge. This shift represented a change in the philosophy of the military's long-held position about caliber size. By the middle of the 1970s, other armies were looking at assault rifle-type weapons. A NATO standardization effort soon started and tests of various rounds were carried out starting in 1977. The U.S. offered the 5.56×45mm M193 round, but there were concerns about its penetration in the face of the wider introduction of body armor. In the end the Belgian 5.56×45mm SS109 round was chosen (STANAG 4172) in October 1980. The SS109 round was based on the U.S. cartridge but included a new stronger, heavier, 62-grain bullet design, with better long-range performance and improved penetration (specifically, to consistently penetrate the side of a steel helmet at 600 metres or 2,000 feet).

Also during the 1970s, Finland, Israel, and South Africa introduced AK type assault rifles in 5.56×45mm. Sweden began the transition with trials in 1981 and full adoption in 1986. During the 1990s, Russia developed the AK-101 in 5.56×45mm NATO for the world export market. In addition, Bulgaria, Czechoslovakia, Hungary, Poland and Yugoslavia (i.e., Serbia) have also rechambered their locally produced assault rifles to 5.56mm NATO.

=== AK-74 ===
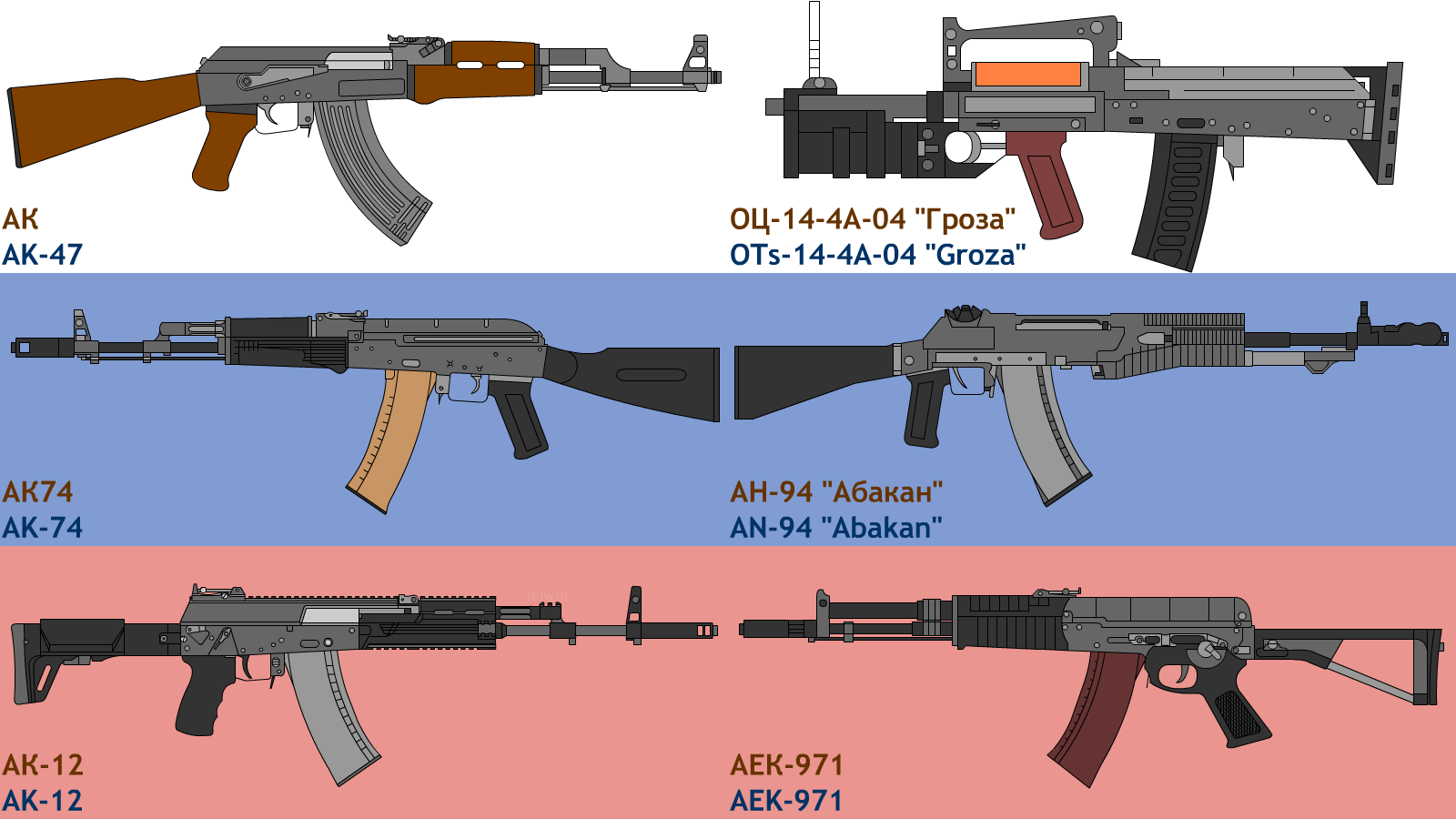
Kalashnikov rifle family: AK-47, AK-74 and AK-12 (left) as well as rare OTs-14, AN-94, and AEK-971

The AK-74 assault rifle was a Soviet answer to the U.S. M16. The Soviet military realized that the M16 had better range and accuracy over the AKM, and that its lighter cartridge allowed soldiers to carry more ammunition. Therefore, in 1967, the USSR issued an official requirement to replace the AKM and the 7.62×39mm cartridge. They soon began to develop the AK-74 and the 5.45×39mm cartridge. AK-74 production began in 1974, and it was unveiled in 1977, when it was carried by Soviet parachute troops during the annual Red Square parade. It would soon replace the AKM and become the standard Soviet infantry rifle. In 1979, the AK-74 saw combat for the first time in Afghanistan, where the lethality of the 5.45mm rounds led to the Mujahadeen dubbing them "poison bullets". The adoption of the 5.56mm NATO and the Russian 5.45×39mm cartridges cemented the worldwide trend toward small caliber, high-velocity cartridges.

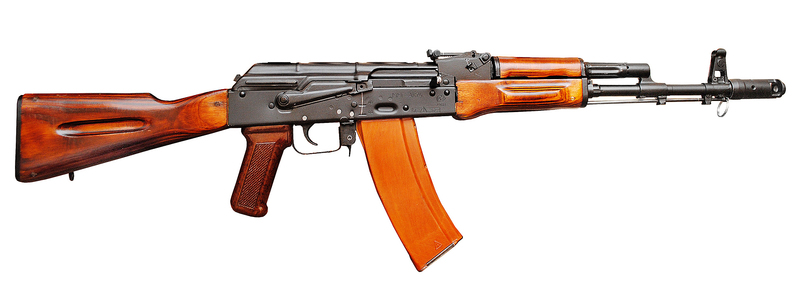
AK-74 rifle

=== Compact assault rifles ===
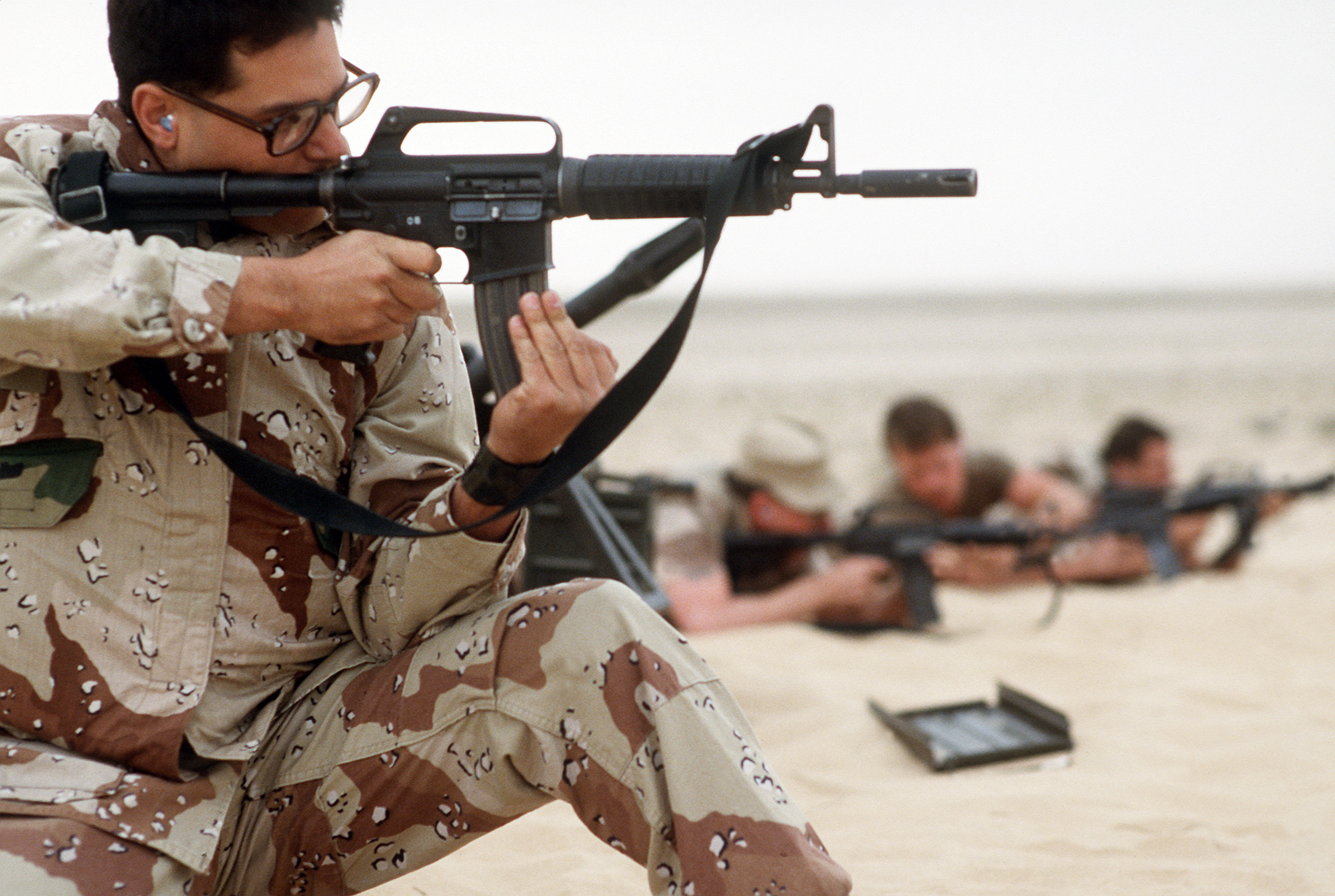
A USAF security policeman aims his Colt Commando during a live-fire demonstration, part of Operation Desert Shield. Note the large flash hider.

Following the adoption of the M16, carbine variants were also adopted for close quarters operations. The AR-15 family of weapons served through the Vietnam War. However, these compact assault rifles had design issues, as "the barrel length was halved" to 10 inches (250 mm) which "upset the ballistics", reducing its range and accuracy and leading "to considerable muzzle flash and blast, so that a large flash suppressor had to be fitted". "Nevertheless, as a short-range weapon it is quite adequate and thus, [despite] its caliber, [the Colt Commando] is classed as a submachine gun." Other compact assault rifles, such as the HK53, AKS-74U and the Daewoo K1, have been made and they have also been called submachine guns.

=== Bullpups ===
In 1977, Austria introduced the 5.56×45mm Steyr AUG bullpup rifle, often cited as the first successful bullpup rifle, finding service with the armed forces of over twenty countries. It was highly advanced for the 1970s, combining in the same weapon the bullpup configuration, a polymer housing, dual vertical grips, an optical sight as standard, and a modular design. Highly reliable, light, and accurate, the Steyr AUG showed clearly the potential of the bullpup layout. In 1978, France introduced the 5.56×45mm FAMAS bullpup rifle. In 1985, the British introduced the 5.56×45mm L85 bullpup rifle. In the late 1990s, Israel introduced the 5.56mm NATO Tavor TAR-21. In 1997, China adopted the QBZ-95 in the new 5.8×42mm cartridge, which they claim is superior to both the 5.56×45mm and the 5.45×39mm. By the turn of the century, the bullpup assault rifle design had achieved worldwide acceptance.

=== Heckler & Koch G36 ===
The Heckler & Koch G36 is a 5.56×45mm assault rifle, designed in the early 1990s by Heckler & Koch in Germany as a replacement for the heavier G3. It was accepted into service with the Bundeswehr in 1997, replacing the G3. The G36 is gas-operated and feeds from a 30-round detachable box magazine or 100-round C-Mag drum magazine. The G36 was made with the extensive use of lightweight, corrosion-resistant synthetic materials in its design; the receiver housing, stock, trigger group (including the fire control selector and firing mechanism parts), magazine well, handguard and carrying handle are all made of a carbon fiber-reinforced polyamide. The receiver has an integrated steel barrel trunnion (with locking recesses) and a nylon 66 steel reinforced receiver. The standard Bundeswehr versions of the G36 are equipped with a unique ZF 3×4° dual optical sight that combines a 3× magnified telescopic sight and an unmagnified reflex sight mounted on top of the telescopic sight. Widely distributed, it has been adopted by over 40 countries and prompted other nations to develop similar composite designs, such as the FX-05 Xiuhcoatl.

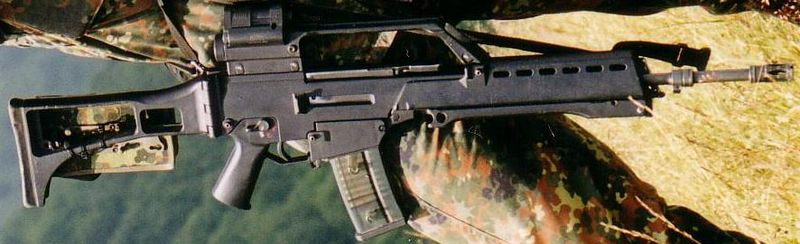
Heckler & Koch G36 with a loaded 30-round magazine

== See also ==
- Glossary of firearms terms
- List of assault rifles
- List of most produced firearms

== General and cited references ==
- Rose, Alexander (2008). American Rifle: A Biography. Bantam Dell Publishing. ISBN 978-0-553-80517-8.
