= AG-043 =

Soviet assault carbine

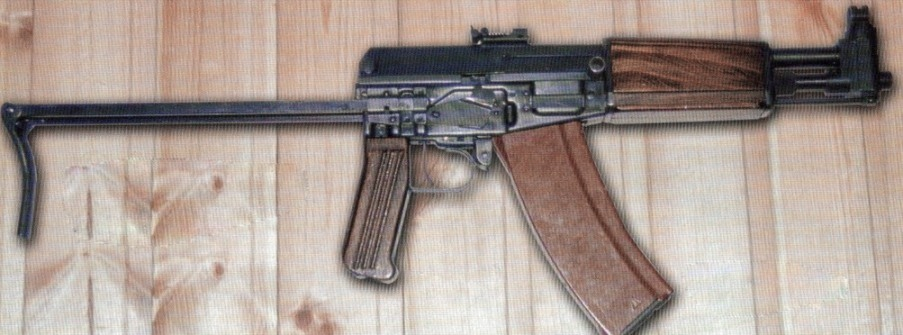
- The AG-043
- Type: Assault rifle carbine
- Place of origin: Soviet Union

Production history
- Designer: Sergei Gavrilovich Simonov
- Designed: 1974
- Produced: 1974

Specifications
- Mass: 2.1 kg (without rounds)
- Length: 680mm 420mm (folded)
- Barrel length: 215 mm
- Cartridge: 5.45×39mm
- Caliber: 5.45mm
- Action: Gas operated
- Muzzle velocity: 700 m/s
- Feed system: 30-round detachable box magazine
- Sights: Iron sights -

AG-043 (АГ-043) was a Soviet compact fully automatic assault rifle or carbine chambered for the 5.45×39mm round, developed in 1975. The weapon is a derivative of the earlier and similar AO-31 which also is Simonov's adaptation of the AK-47.

The AG-043 had folding stock; a version with fixed stock was given the designation AG-042. Both were designed by Simonov after the GRAU launched Project Modern intended to adopt a carbine capable of automatic fire, inspired by the US experience with XM177 in Vietnam. The Soviet contest for this design was won by Kalashnikov's AKS-74U.

== See also ==
- List of Russian weaponry
- List of assault rifles
