= Fyodorov–Shpagin Model 1922 =

- Type: Machine gun
- Place of origin: Soviet Union

Production history
- Designer: Vladimir Fyodorov, Georgy Shpagin
- Designed: 1922

Specifications
- Cartridge: 6.5×51mm Fyodorov
- Caliber: 6.5mm
- Barrels: 2
- Rate of fire: 1200rpm
- Feed system: 2×25-round detachable box magazine
- Sights: Iron

The Fyodorov–Shpagin Model 1922 was an experimental twin barrel Soviet machine gun. It was designed by Vladimir Fyodorov and Georgy Shpagin and was chambered in 6.5×51mm Fyodorov.
