= Vladimir Grigoryevich Fyodorov =

Russian and Soviet weapons designer (1874–1966)

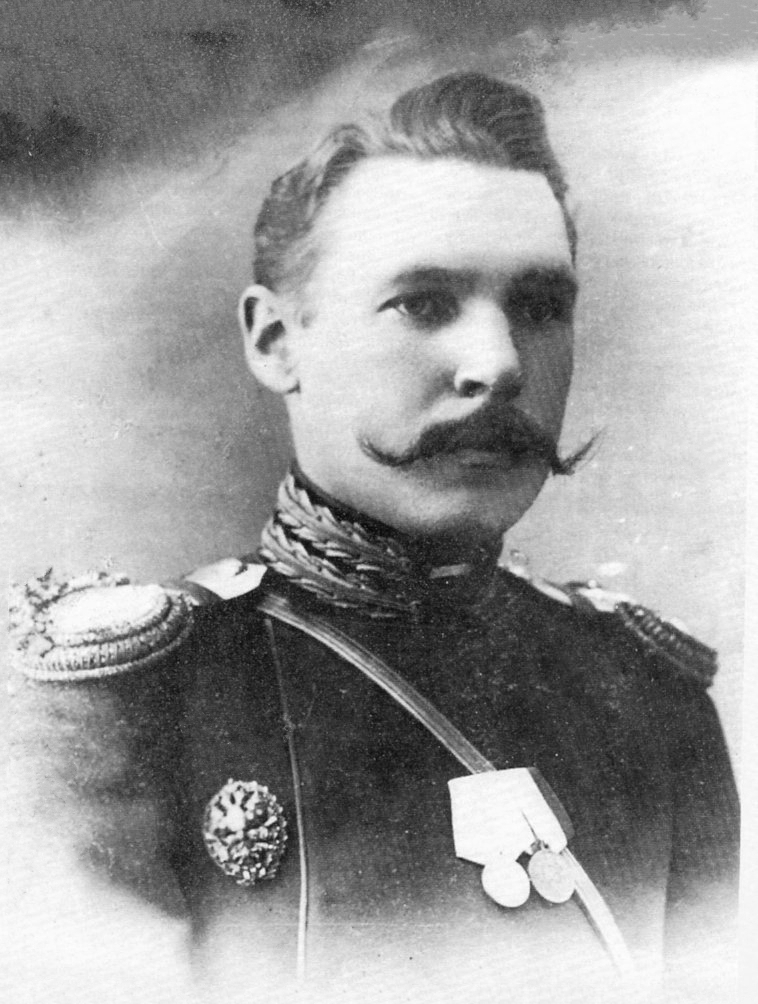
- Fyodorov in 1900 as an officer of the Imperial Russian Army
- Born: Vladimir Grigoryevich Fyodorov; 15 May 1874; Saint Petersburg, Russian Empire
- Died: 19 September 1966 (aged 92); Moscow, Soviet Union
- Occupations: Inventor, scientist, weapons designer, professor, lieutenant general

Vladimir Grigoryevich Fyodorov (Russian: Владимир Григорьевич Фёдоров; 15 May [O.S. 3 May] 1874 – 19 September 1966) was a Russian and Soviet scientist, weapons designer, professor, lieutenant general of the Soviet technical-engineering service and a founder of the Soviet school of automatic small arms.

In 1900, Vladimir Fyodorov graduated from Mikhailovskaya Artillery Academy and was transferred to the artillery committee of the Chief Artillery Directorate (Главное артиллерийское управление). He designed several automatic rifles: one chambered in 7.62 mm (1912), another in 6.5 mm for a cartridge of his own design (1913), and one of the first prototype assault rifles in the world: the Avtomat Fyodorova (1916), which was originally designed to fire a shortened Arisaka 6.5mm rifle cartridge, but saw service firing the full-sized 6.5 mm Arisaka rifle cartridge due to reliability issues in testing and foresight of logistical problems. Automatic weapons designed by Fyodorov were used during World War I and the Russian Civil War.

After the October Revolution, Fyodorov was appointed head and technical director (1918–1931) of the first Soviet weapons plant, which produced submachine guns of his design.

In 1921, he organized and headed a design bureau at the automatic small arms factory.

In 1922, Fyodorov designed the Fyodorov-Shpagin machine gun with his protégé Georgy Shpagin, who would later design the PPSh-41 submachine gun.

From 1931 to 1933, Fyodorov worked as a standardization consultant at a weapons and machine gun trust. He then published several works on automatic weapons and was appointed a small arms consultant at Narkomat and with the Ministry of Arms (1942–1946).

Between 1946 and 1953, Fyodorov was a member of the Academy of Artillery Sciences. He tutored prominent Soviet arms designers, Shpagin, Vasily Degtyaryov, Sergei Simonov and others. Vladimir Fyodorov authored some scientific works on the history, design, production, and combat use of small firearms.

== Honours and awards ==
- Hero of Labour
- Two Orders of Lenin
- Order of the Patriotic War, 1st class
- Order of the Red Star
