= PTRS-41 =

Soviet anti-tank rifle

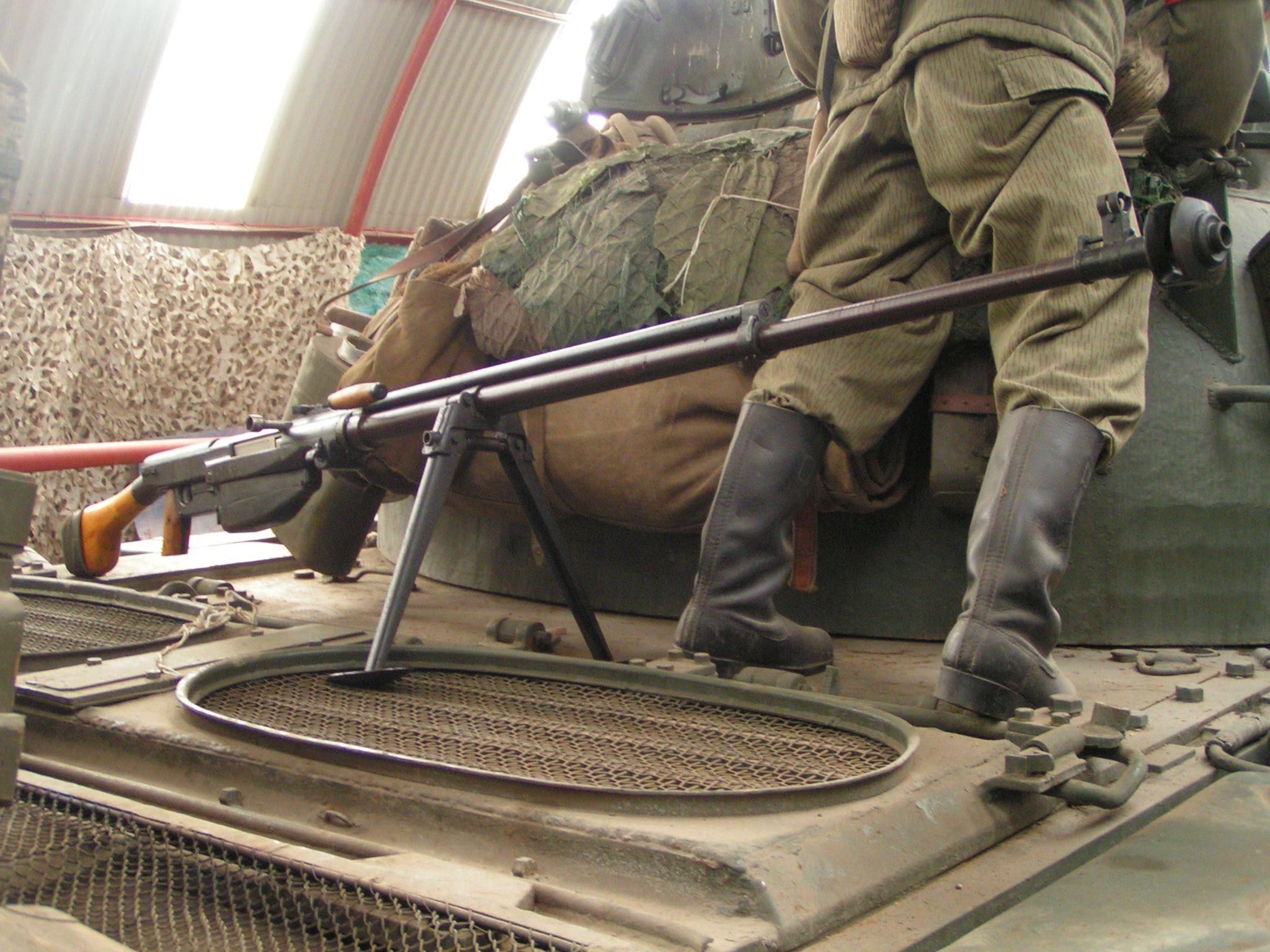
- PTRS
- Type: Anti-tank rifle
- Place of origin: Soviet Union

Service history
- In service: 1941–present
- Used by: see Users
- Wars: World War II; Korean War; Chinese Civil War; Lebanese Civil War; Syrian Civil War; War in Donbas; Russo-Ukrainian War

Production history
- Designer: Sergei Gavrilovich Simonov
- Designed: 1938–1939
- Produced: 1941–1945

Specifications
- Mass: 21 kg (46 lb)
- Length: 2.11 m (6 ft 11 in)
- Barrel length: 1.22 m (4 ft 0 in)
- Cartridge: 14.5×114mm
- Caliber: 14.5 mm (0.57 in)
- Action: Gas-operated; short stroke gas piston, vertically tilting bolt
- Muzzle velocity: 1,013 m/s (3,320 ft/s)
- Effective firing range: 800 m (870 yd) against armoured vehicles
- Maximum firing range: 1,500 m (1,600 yd) against armoured vehicles
- Feed system: 5-round integral box magazine

The PTRS-41 (Russian: Противотанковое самозарядное ружьё образца 1941 года системы Симонова, romanized: Protivotankovoye samozaryadnoye ruzhyo obraztsa 1941 goda sistemy Simonova, lit. 'Anti-tank-self-loading gun pattern 1941, Simonov system') is a World War II-era semi-automatic anti-tank rifle firing the 14.5×114mm cartridge.

== Design ==
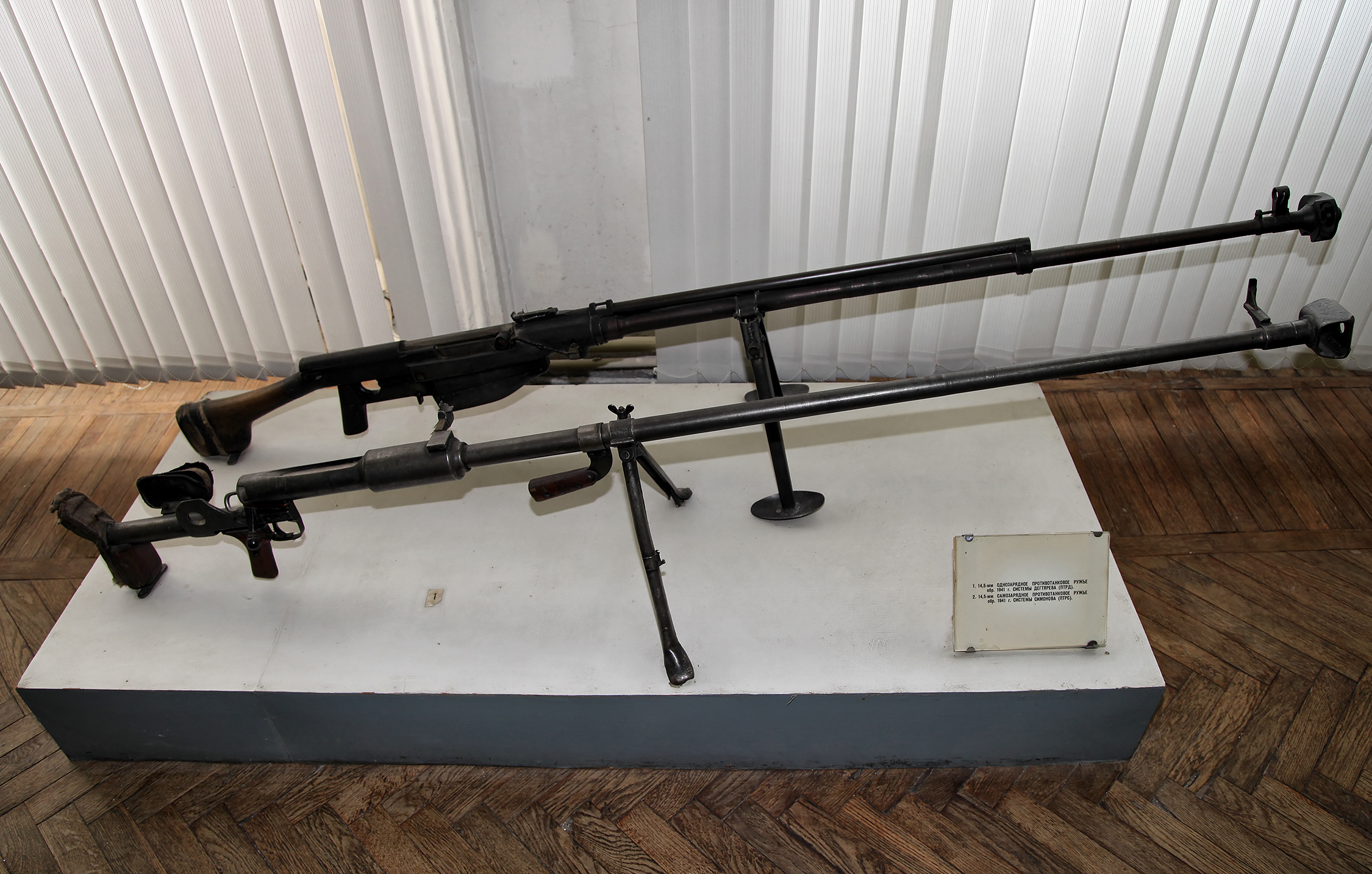
14.5mm anti-tank rifles PTRD-41 and PTRS-41

The PTRS-41 was produced and used by the Soviet Union during World War II. In the years between the World Wars, the Soviet Union began experimenting with different types of armor-piercing anti-tank cartridges. Finding the 12.7×108mm insufficient, they began development of what became the 14.5×114mm armor-piercing round. Rukavishnikov developed his anti-tank rifle M1939 to use this cartridge, but it was not successful because of some manufacturing issues, a sufficient number of more effective anti-tank guns in the Red Army, and high expectations about new German tank armor.

In 1941, the loss of huge amounts of anti-tank artillery created a need for a stop-gap anti-tank weapon, so famous USSR weapons designers such as Vasily Degtyaryov and Sergei Gavrilovich Simonov were tasked to design anti-tank rifles. Both were considered simpler and more suitable to wartime production than an updated Rukavishnikov rifle. Simonov used elements of a family of his 7.62x54R self-loading rifles and carbines which he continued to develop after his 1938 design lost to SVT-38 to create a scaled-up self-loading rifle.

The five-round clip is loaded into the receiver and held under pressure by a swing magazine underneath. On firing the last round, the bolt is held open, and the magazine release catch can be operated only when the bolt is locked back. The gas-operated PTRS has a tendency to jam when dirty, and the 14.5mm cartridge produces significant residue, blocking the gas port. The 14.5mm armor-piercing bullet has a muzzle velocity of 1,013 m/s (3,320 ft/s) and devastating ballistics. It can penetrate an armor plate up to 40 mm (1.6 in) thick at a distance of 100 m (330 ft).

In 1943 Simonov used a scaled-down PTRS-41 design for the SKS, that would accommodate the new 1943-designed 7.62×39mm cartridge.

== History ==
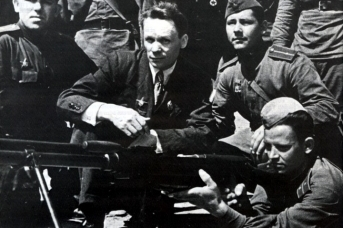
Sergei Simonov during a test of the PTRS-41 anti-tank rifle, firing 14.5×115mm rounds that he himself designed in 1941

Along with his partner Vasily Degtyaryov, Sergei Gavrilovich Simonov helped the Soviet Union develop new weapons between the First and Second World War. During this time, Degtyaryov went on to create the PTRD-41 while Simonov created and designed its cousin rifle, the PTRS-41 in 1938. As one of Simonov's creations, the PTRS-41 was sometimes known as simply the "Simonov" on the battlefield. Although more advanced, the PTRS was harder to use and less reliable than the cheaper PTRD while yielding similar performance, so the PTRD was used more often.

The semi-automatic anti-tank rifle was used extensively on the Eastern Front in World War II. It was used successfully by Hero of the Soviet Union Sergeant Yakov Pavlov during the Battle of Stalingrad when the NCO led the defense of Pavlov's House in the city after he mounted rifles on the building's roof. Because the rifles were effective against thin armor at close range, they were able to destroy numerous German Panzers that came into range because they could shoot through the thin armor on their turret-roofs. Guns captured by the Germans were given the designation 14.5 mm PzB 784(r).

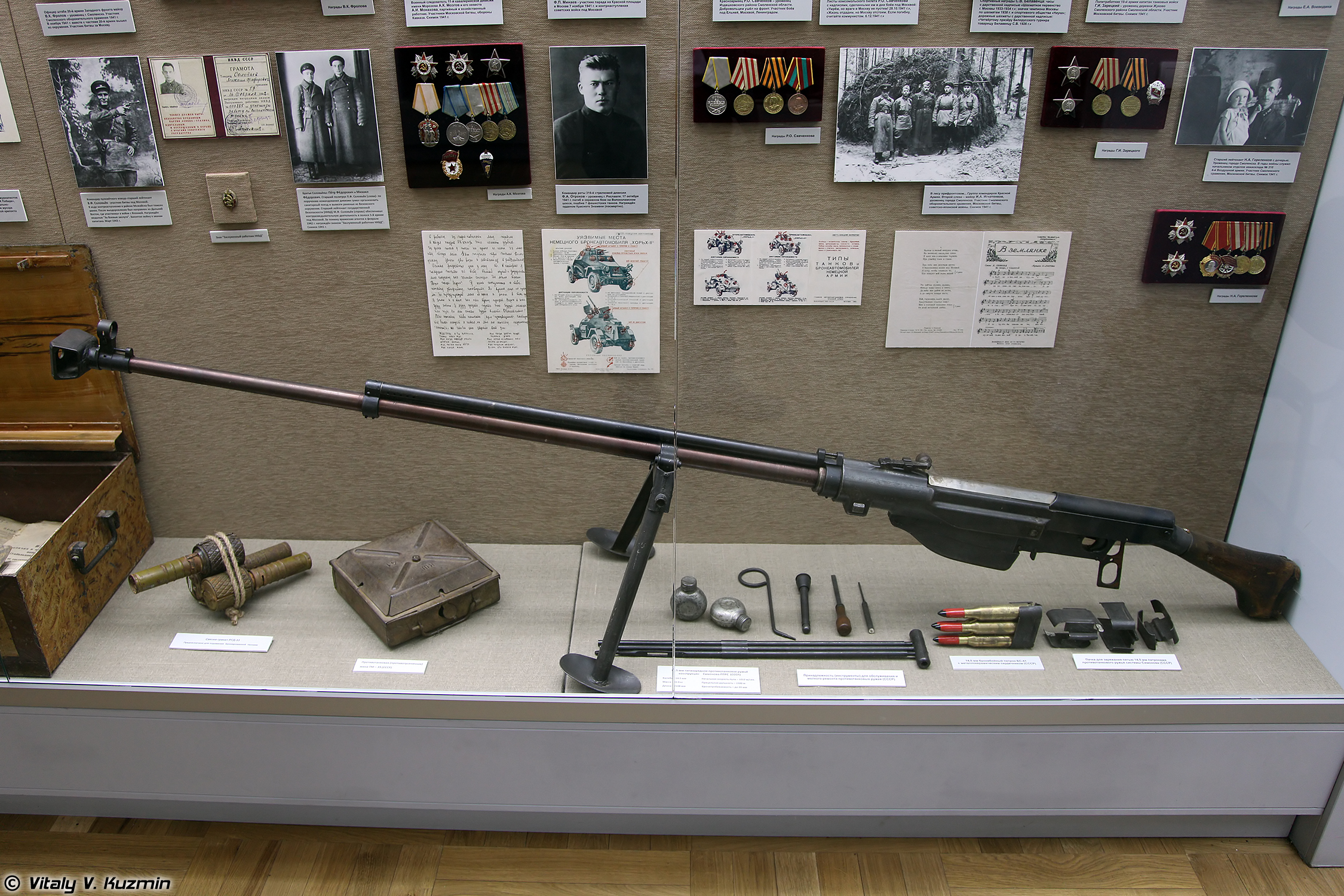
PTRS rifle at Great Patriotic War museum in Smolensk

Although the PTRS-41 anti-armor capabilities quickly diminished after its introduction in 1941 due to increasing thickness of German tank armor, the 14.5×114mm round was still useful against soft-skinned targets such as trucks and in urban warfare.

The AT gun was used again by Communist-backed forces in the Korean War and Chinese Civil War.

PTRS-41 rifles have been used by Donbas militiamen in Ukraine, during the Russo-Ukrainian War, due to their ability to penetrate APC armor.

== Users ==
- Albania: Used as late as 1980
- China
- Hungary: Used as late as 1960
- Nazi Germany: Captured rifles designated as 14.5 mm Panzerabwehrbüchse 784(r)
- Romania: Used as late as 1960
- USSR
- Ukraine

=== Non-state actors ===
- Donetsk People's Republic
- Syrian opposition

== See also ==
- List of Russian weaponry
- PTRD-41
- Boys anti-tank rifle
- Lahti L-39
- Mauser 1918 T-Gewehr
- Panzerbüchse 39
- Solothurn S-18/100
- Type 97 automatic cannon
- Wz. 35 anti-tank rifle

== Bibliography ==
- Beevor, Antony (1999). Stalingrad. United Kingdom: Penguin. p. 154. ISBN 978-0-14-103240-5.
- Bishop, Chris (2002). The Encyclopedia of Weapons of World War II. Sterling Publishing Company, Inc. ISBN 978-1-58663-762-0.
- Department of the Army, United States (1960). Handbook on the Satellite Armies. Washington, DC: Headquarters, Department of the Army.
- Koll, Christian (2009). Soviet Cannon - A Comprehensive Study of Soviet Arms and Ammunition in Calibres 12.7mm to 57mm. Austria: Koll. p. 91. ISBN 978-3-200-01445-9.
- Weeks, Col. John, ed. (1980). Jane's Infantry Weapons, 1980-81. Jane's Publishing Company. ISBN 978-0-531-03936-6.
