= SG-43 Goryunov =

SG-43
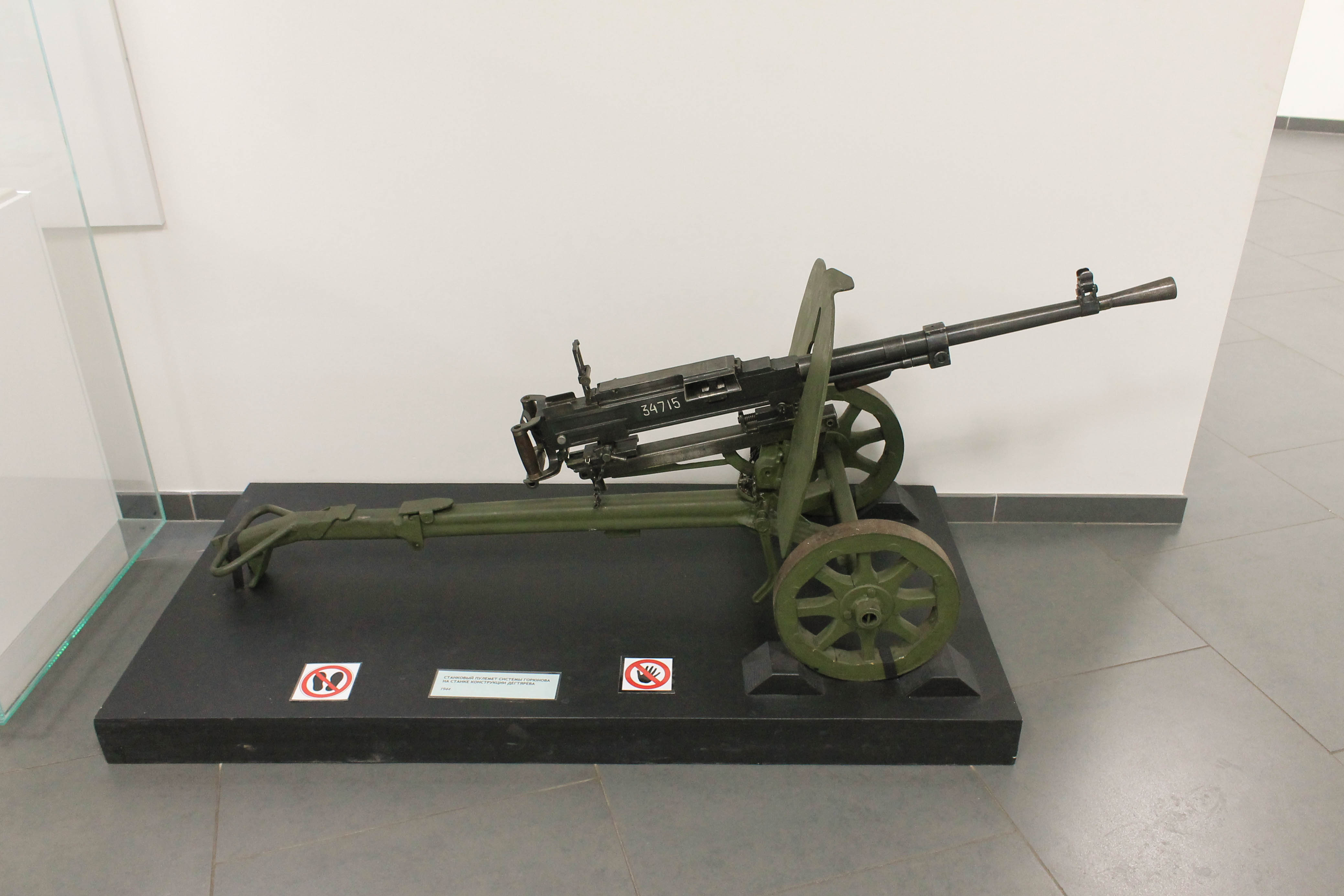
- A static SG-43 inside the Road of Life museum in Ladoga lake station.
- Type: Medium machine gun
- Place of origin: Soviet Union

Service history
- In service: 1943–1968 (Soviet Union)
- Wars: World War II; Korean War; Vietnam War; Laotian Civil War; Cambodian Civil War; Hungarian Revolution of 1956; Portuguese Colonial War; Rhodesian Bush War; South African Border War; North Yemen Civil War; Six-Day War; Yom Kippur War; Lebanese Civil War; Angolan Civil War; Mozambican Civil War; Uganda-Tanzania War; Wars in Afghanistan; Somali Civil War; Gulf War; Burundian Civil War; Congo-Brazzaville Civil War; Iraq War; Kivu conflict Northern Mali Conflict; Syrian Civil War; Saudi Arabian-led intervention in Yemen

Production history
- Designer: P.M. Goryunov
- Designed: 1940–1943
- Variants: SG-43, SGM, SGMT, SGMB

Specifications
- Mass: 13.8 kg (30.42 lb) gun body 41 kg (90.39 lb) on wheeled mount
- Length: 1,150 mm (45.3 in)
- Barrel length: 720 mm (28.3 in)
- Cartridge: 7.62×54mmR
- Action: Gas-operated
- Rate of fire: 500–700 rounds/min
- Muzzle velocity: 800 m/s (2,624 ft/s)
- Effective firing range: 1100 m (1200 yd)
- Maximum firing range: 1,500 meters
- Feed system: 200 or 250 round belts
- Sights: Iron sights

The SG-43 Goryunov (Russian: Станковый пулемёт системы Горюнова, Stankovyy pulyemyot sistyemy Goryunova, meaning "Mounted machinegun, Goryunov design") was a Soviet medium machine gun that was introduced during the Second World War. It was chambered for the 7.62×54mmR cartridge, and was introduced in 1943 as a replacement for the older M1910 Maxim machine guns. It was mounted on wheeled mounts, tripods and armored vehicles.

== Design ==
The SG-43 used a tilting bolt, moving sideways and locking into the side of the receiver. The feed is not straightforward, as the gun fires the 7.62×54mmR round, and this has to be withdrawn rearwards from the belt before ramming into the breech. The reciprocating motion is achieved by using two claws to pull the round from the belt, and then an arm pushes the round into the cartridge guide ready for the bolt to carry it to the breech. Despite this complication, the SG-43 was remarkably reliable and feed jams were apparently few.

The barrel is air-cooled and massively dense, contributing to a fairly high overall weight. The bore is chromium-plated and able to withstand continuous fire for long periods. The barrel can also be easily changed by releasing a simple lock, and the carrying handle allows a hot barrel to be lifted clear without difficulty. The World War II version of the gun had a smooth outline to the barrel, and the cocking handle was under the receiver, with no dust covers to the feed and ejection ports.

== History ==
The machine gun was developed as GVG (after last names of three designers) from February 1940 to November 1942, originally to be fired from either a magazine or belt-fed, however in spring 1942 the magazine feeding was dropped. After field trials on the frontline it was adopted as the M1943 Goryunov machine gun in May 1943.

In 1944-1945 the machine gun was improved by Alexander Zaytsev and Mikhail Kalashnikov, with the new version receiving SGM ("M" for modernized) designation. Reloading handle was moved, dust covers and a new barrel lock were fitted, and a splined barrel was fitted to improve cooling. A coaxially-mounted stockless electric solenoid-fired variant was developed under the designation SGMT (the "T" standing for Tankovy, or "Tank"). The SG-43M and SGMB are versions modified with dust covers and used mostly on armoured personnel carriers.

The SG-43/SGM was widely exported and also licensed for construction in several countries. It was manufactured in the People's Republic of China as the Type 53 (SG-43) and Type 57 (SGM) heavy machine guns. It was also produced in Czechoslovakia (as Vz 43) and Poland (as Wz 43).

In addition to World War II, SG-43 saw service in the Korean War with the Communist North Korean and Chinese forces. In Soviet service, the Goryunov, together with the RP-46, was replaced in the 1960s by the PK machine gun due to the switch in Soviet tactical doctrine to the general-purpose machine gun concept, rendering the gun effectively obsolete.

=== KGK general purpose machine gun ===
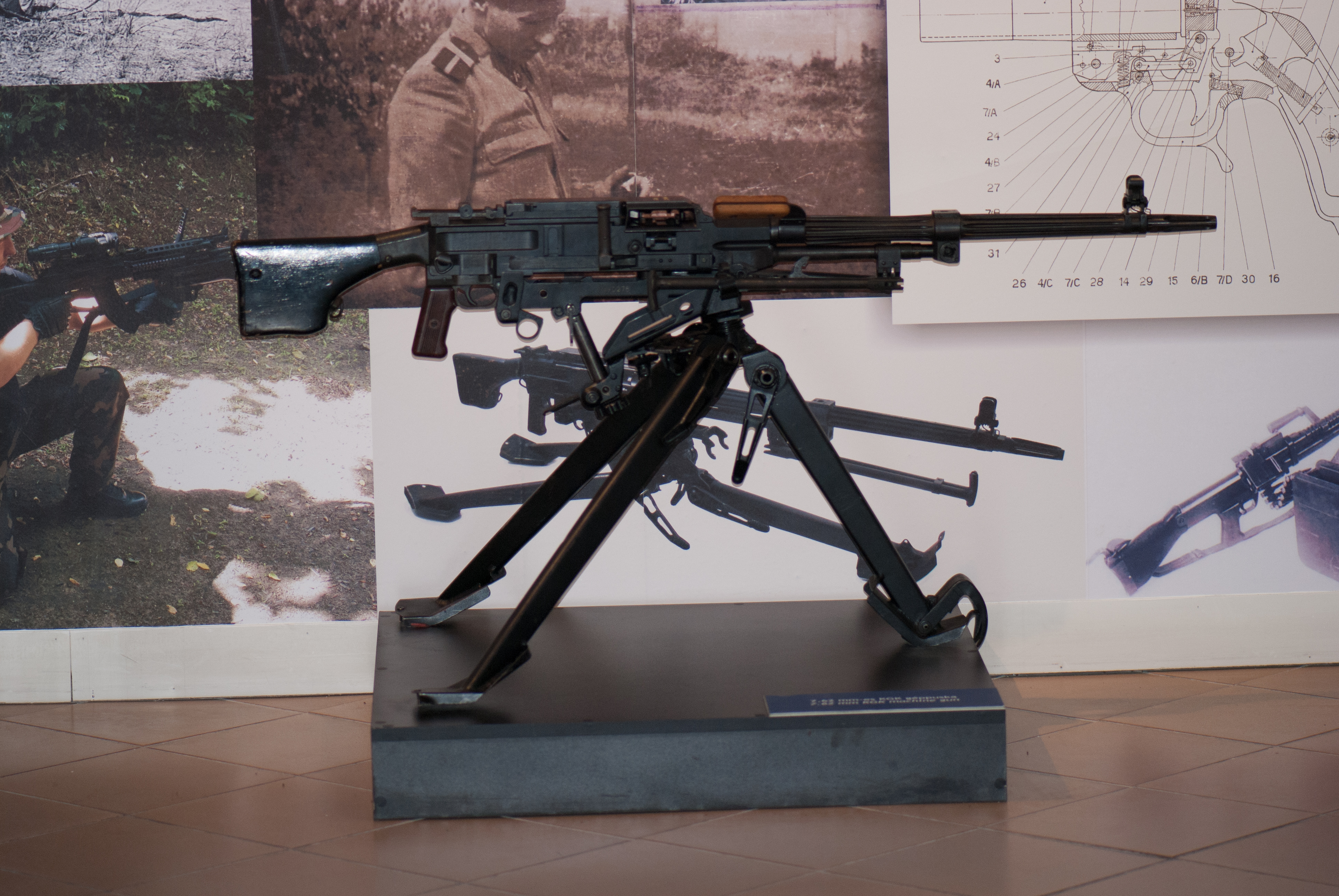
A KGK on a tripod at the Museum of Military History in Budapest

The KGK (Korszerűsített Gorjunov-Kucher) general purpose machine gun was based on the Goryunov machine gun modified by a FEG team headed by József Kucher (partner of Pál Király best known for his Kucher Model K1 SMG) and produced in Hungary during the 1960s and 1970s. The team added a butt-stock, a pistol grip, a conventional trigger and a bipod from the RPD machine gun, moved the charging handle from the bottom to the side, and redesigned the barrel lock mechanism so that the barrel could be quickly changed in the field. Otherwise, the machine gun is identical to an SGM, and most parts are interchangeable.

It was used by the Hungarian army on a limited scale, including in the KGKT version as the turret machine gun on D-944 PSZH scout car, and was later replaced by a domestically produced copy of the Kalashnikov PKM machine gun.

== Users ==
- Afghanistan: SGM used by DRA and the Afghan mujahideen during the Soviet–Afghan War and by Afghan National Army
- Burundi: Burundian rebels
- Cape Verde: SGM
- Central African Republic

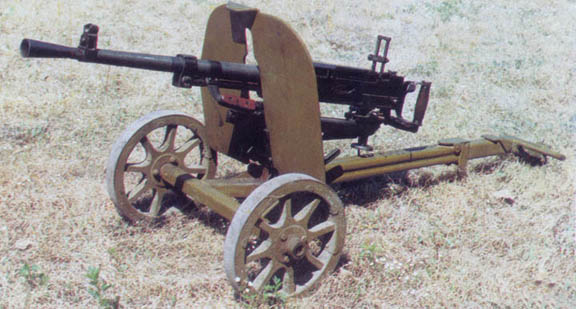
Type 53 MMG

- Chad: SGM
- China: Type 53 (SG-43) and Type 57 (SGM) heavy machine gun; Type 59 coaxial machine gun (SGMT)
- Cuba: SG-43
- Republic of Congo: Chinese-made SGM used by Cocoye militia during Congo Civil War
- Democratic Republic of Congo: Armed Forces of the Democratic Republic of the Congo used SGMs

- Democratic Forces for the Liberation of Rwanda, sometimes known as MILOU, for mitrailleuse lourde (heavy machine gun)

- Czechoslovakia: produced under license as Kulomet vz. 43 from 1953.
- Egypt: built under license Used SG-43 and SGM.
- Finland: used during World War II in limited numbers
- Georgia
- Guinea: SGM
- Guinea-Bissau: SGM
- East Germany: SG-43 and SGM
- Hungary: SG-43 and KGK variant
- Indonesia: used by Mobile Indonesian Police Brigade (BRIMOB)
- Iraq: SGM variant
- Libya: SGM variant
- Mali: SG-43, SGM, Type 53 and Type 57 variants
- Mozambique: SGM
- North Korea: used during the Korean War.
- North Vietnam: SG-43, Type 53, SGM and Type 57 variants used during the Vietnam War by the NVA and the Vietcong
- Palestine Liberation Organisation
- Poland: SG-43
- Romania: SG-43 and SGM
- São Tomé and Príncipe: SGM
- Somalia
- Soviet Union: SG-43 and SGM were still in service in the late 1960s
- Syria
- Tanzania
- Yemen
- Zambia: SGM
- Zimbabwe

== Sources ==
- Smith, Joseph E. (1969). Small Arms of the World (11 ed.). Harrisburg, Pennsylvania: The Stackpole Company. ISBN 9780811715669.
- Hogg, Ian V., ed. (1 January 1988). Jane's Infantry Weapons, 1988-89. Jane's Information Group. ISBN 978-0-7106-0857-4.
