= Danuvia VD-01 =

- Type: Machine pistol/semi-automatic pistol
- Place of origin: Hungary

Production history
- Designer: Róbert Vörös
- Manufacturer: Danuvia Engineering Industries, and Intermodul Weapon Shops
- Produced: 1990-1998(Danuvia), 1998-?(Intermodul)
- No. built: over 100 until 1998

Specifications
- Mass: Without magazine: 2.00 kg (4.41 lb); Magazine, empty: 0.45 kg (0.99 lb)
- Length: 303 mm (11.9 in)
- Barrel length: Rifled bore length: 127 mm (5.0 in)
- Cartridge: 9×19mm Parabellum
- Action: Short Blowback
- Rate of fire: 330 rds/min
- Muzzle velocity: ~350 m/s (1,100 ft/s)
- Effective firing range: 75 m (82 yd)
- Feed system: 33-round helical magazine
- Sights: Iron sights, can have various sights mounted

The Forte VD.01(often called Danuvia VD-01) is a pistol manufactured, for a short time, by Danuvia Engineering Industries from 1990. In 1998, the rights to manufacture were sold to Intermodul Weapon Shops. The gun has gained some international attention as an oddity due to its unorthodox appearance and helical magazine, and is often compared to the Calico M950 and M960A. The gun has polygonal rifling.

The Danuvia factory, having taken over prototypes by Róbert Vörös, only produced 50–60 examples of the pistol in the early 1990s. Due to difficult economic conditions at the factory caused by the deliberate downsizing of Hungarian arms production, production was limited. A submachine-gun version was produced as a prototype, but never entered mass production. It’s likely the designers considered developing the submachine-gun variant during the design draft, supported by the high magazine capacity, the submachine-gun-like controls, and the magazine’s construction.

Some prototypes of a machine pistol version were built.
