= Cristóbal Carbine =

Rifle made in the Dominican Republic

San Cristóbal Carbine
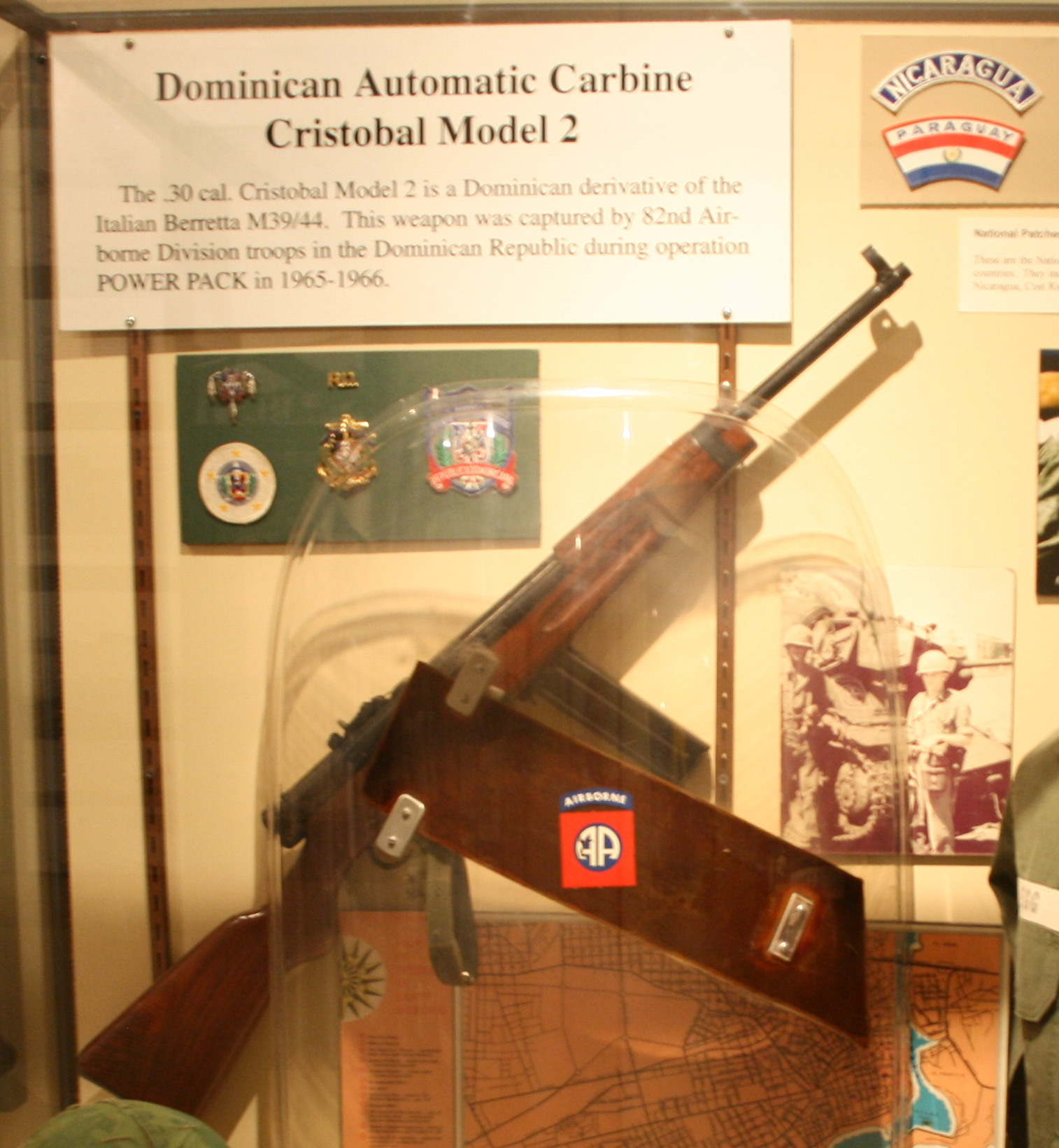
- Type: Carbine
- Place of origin: Dominican Republic

Service history
- Used by: See Users
- Wars: Cuban Revolution; Dominican Civil War; Colombian conflict

Production history
- Manufacturer: Armería San Cristóbal Weapon Factory
- Produced: 1950-1966
- No. built: over 200,000

Specifications
- Mass: 3.53 kg (7.8 lb) empty 4.25 kg (9.4 lb) loaded
- Length: 945 mm (37.2 in)
- Barrel length: 405 mm (15.9 in)
- Cartridge: .30 Carbine
- Action: Lever-delayed blowback
- Rate of fire: 580 rpm
- Muzzle velocity: 572 m/s (1,880 ft/s)
- Feed system: 30-round box magazine
- Sights: Iron sights, adjustable from 100–500 m

The .30 Kiraly-Cristóbal Carbine, also known as the San Cristóbal or Cristóbal Automatic Rifle, was manufactured by the Dominican Republic’s Armería San Cristóbal Weapon Factory.

== History and development ==
Although called a carbine, the gun may be termed a submachine gun since it is identical to the Hungarian Danuvia 43M submachine gun. Both weapons were designed by Hungarian engineer Pál Király, who came to the Dominican Republic as an expatriate in 1948. The gun's name is a reference to the San Cristóbal Province, which is the birthplace of the late Dominican dictator, Generalissimo Rafael Trujillo. The Dominican Republic's military was the main user of this weapon although it was also exported to Cuba prior to the Cuban Revolution.

== Description ==
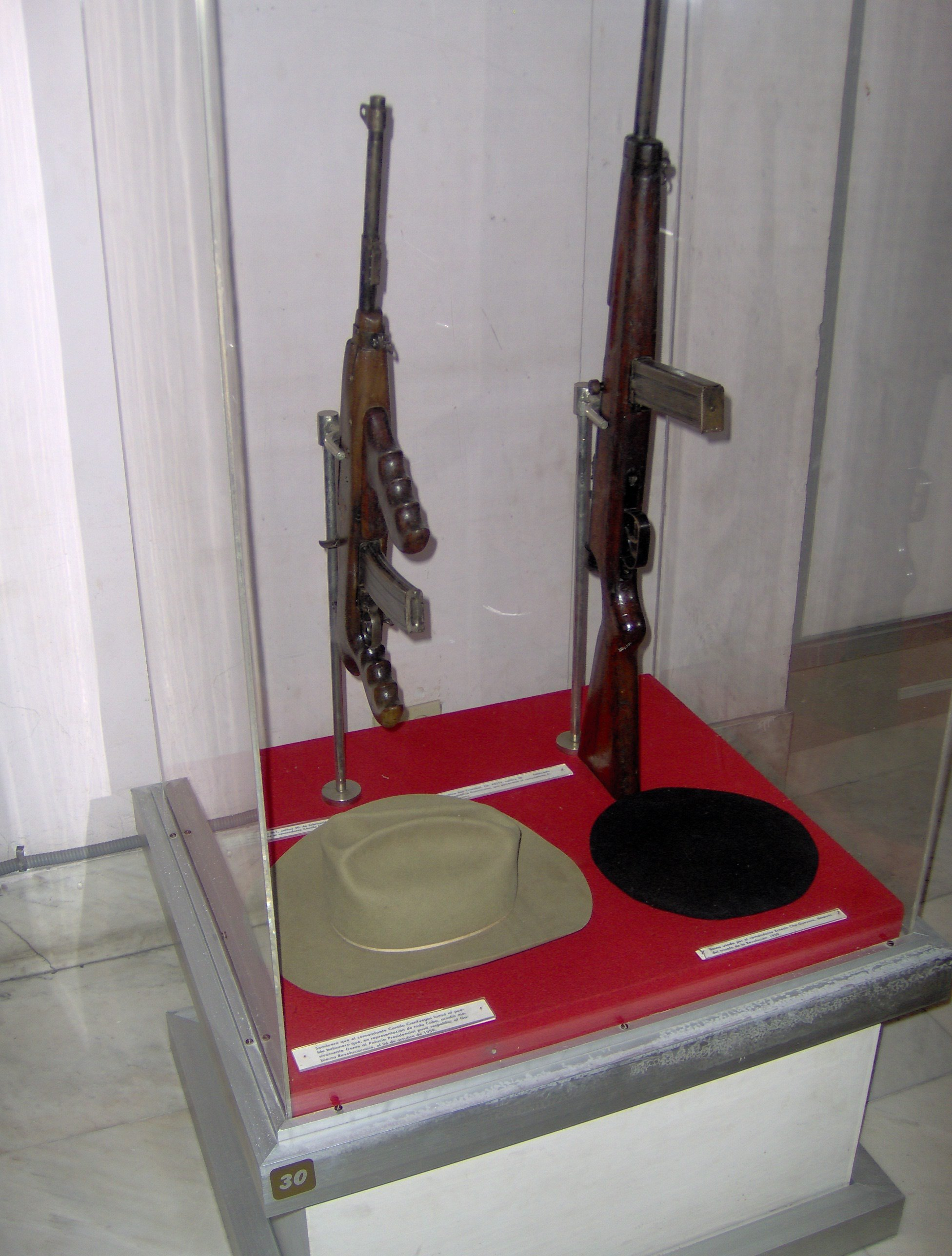
Cristóbal Carbine used by Che Guevara (on right), modified M2 carbine used by Camilo Cienfuegos

The Cristóbal had a wooden stock, 30-round bottom-mounted box magazine, and tubular receiver with a fixed cocking handle on the right-hand side. It used lever-delayed blowback for its operation. The original version was produced in 9×19mm Parabellum. The most typical version of the Cristóbal was made in .30 Carbine.

Over 200,000 Cristóbals were made by the Armeria San Cristóbal from 1950 to 1966. After Trujillo’s assassination on May 31, 1961, the Dominican government decided not to maintain a local military industry and production was slowly wound down. By 1990, the Cristóbal was no longer a standard Dominican firearm, but continues to be used for basic training in the Dominican Republic's military schools.

This carbine was used by Che Guevara during the Cuban Revolution.

== Users ==
- Cuba
- Dominican Republic
- Panama

== See also ==
- List of delayed-blowback firearms
- List of carbines
