= 9×25mm Mauser =

Pistol cartridge

9×25mm Mauser, 9mm Mauser Export
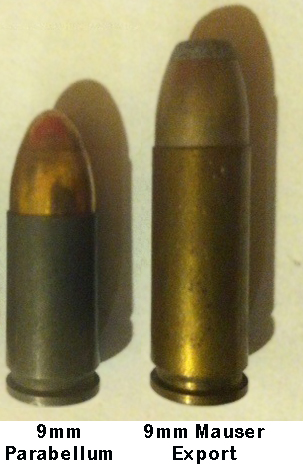
- 9×19mm Parabellum (left) and 9mm Mauser Export (right) cartridges for comparison
- Type: Pistol
- Place of origin: German Empire

Service history
- Used by: Austria, Hungary, Chile, others

Production history
- Designer: Deutsche Waffen und Munitionsfabriken
- Designed: 1904

Specifications
- Parent case: 7.63×25mm Mauser
- Case type: Rimless, straight
- Bullet diameter: 9.02 mm (0.355 in)
- Land diameter: 8.82 mm (0.347 in)
- Rim diameter: 9.9 mm (0.39 in)
- Case length: 24.9 mm (0.98 in)
- Overall length: 32.8 mm (1.29 in)
- Maximum pressure: 260 MPa (38,000 psi)

Ballistic performance
Bullet mass/type	Velocity	Energy
127 gr (8 g) FMJ	1,325 ft/s (404 m/s)	495 ft⋅lbf (671 J)
- Test barrel length: 5.5

The 9×25mm Mauser (or 9mm Mauser Export) is a cartridge developed for the Mauser C96 service pistol around 1904 by DWM. Mauser pistols in this relatively powerful caliber were primarily intended for export to Africa, Asia, and South America. The 9mm Mauser Export cartridge was produced specifically for Mauser pistols and carbines made from 1904 to 1914 and then later from approximately 1930 to 1945 for submachine guns chambered for this caliber.

The basis of this cartridge is the 7.63×25mm Mauser. The case length is the same as the 7.63×25mm Mauser, but the case is straight and does not have a bottleneck shape. This cartridge headspaces on the mouth of the case.

== Manufacture ==
Although Germany was not a primary user of firearms in this caliber, it was a major producer of it, both for commercial export and foreign military contracts. Pre-World War I production was for C96 Mauser pistols, but as war loomed, production was re-oriented towards calibers in official military usage. Demand for the cartridge returned in the 1930s, as it was used in several Austrian, Hungarian and Swiss submachine guns and machine carbines. German munitions companies DWM, Geco (Gustav Genschow & Co.) and RWS (Rheinische-Westfälische Sprengstoff AG) made this round through World War II. Various munitions factories in Austria and Hungary produced this round in the 1930s and 1940s as well as Kynoch, Fiocchi, Société Française des Munitions of Paris, France, and Greek Powder and Cartridge Co. of Athens, Greece. In Italy, the round was manufactured at the Giulio Fiocchi plant in Lecco, both during World War II for military purposes and in the 1950s and 1960s for limited commercial sale.

== C96 ==
Mauser C96 pistols in this caliber usually have an indentation milled into the upper surface of the magazine's follower to facilitate feeding of the straight-cased 9×25mm cartridge cases. The rifling in the barrel has a unique 13.8 twist. In addition, the flat surfaces extending around the chamber are longer, to accommodate the higher pressures of the 9×25mm cartridge. Maximum average pressure using transducer method as per C.I.P. datasheet is 2600 bar. Examples of Mauser C96s in this caliber are rare, but are still occasionally found on the private collector's market.

In Africa, big-game hunter W.D.M. Bell carried a stocked C96 in 9mm Mauser Export as his personal sidearm, nicknamed "Bom-Bom". According to Bell, the "particularly vicious bang" of the 9mm Mauser intimidated hostile natives he encountered and "kept them dodging dust-bursts for four or five hundred yards".

In 1940, Mauser officials proposed using the C-96 as the vehicle for an upgrade to the 9×25mm cartridge to match the ballistics of the .357 Magnum. The upgrade would entail increasing the velocity to 450 m/s and introducing a crimp around the mouth of the case.

== Mauser C/06-08 ==
As the German Army seemed to show more official interest in DWM's P-08 Luger pistol than in their C-96, Mauser developed a new design in hopes of competing more successfully. This was the experimental Model 1906-08 (or C/06-08) pistol introduced in 1906, chambered in 9×25mm Mauser. This firearm had a similar layout to the C-96, with the magazine situated in front of the trigger group (although in the case of the C/06-08 this was detachable, coming in 6, 10 or 15 round capacities), but it used a flapper locking system that was considerably different. The pistol generated interest in some quarters, including with the German and Brazilian armies, but was never manufactured for commercial sale, and today only a few examples exist as museum or collector's pieces.

== Submachine guns ==
The 9×25mm Mauser returned to prominence after World War I as a viable, powerful cartridge for submachine guns. As Germany was restricted by the Treaty of Versailles from manufacturing certain small arms, it outsourced production to companies in other countries, including Belgium and Switzerland. Rheinmetall set up Waffenfabrik Solothurn in Switzerland to manufacture the MP19, designed by Louis Stange and Theodor Rakula. As Solothurn did not have the production capacity for large-scale manufacturing, Rheinmetall acquired a controlling interest in Waffenfabrik Steyr of Steyr Daimler-Puch AG, an established arms manufacturer in Austria, creating the business consortium Steyr-Solothurn Waffen AG. The Solothurn trademark changed from a single S to a double S with a W in the center.

The MP19 design became the Steyr-Solothurn S1-100. Under the designation of MP30 and MP34, it was adopted by the Austrian police and Army respectively. It was manufactured until 1940 in several calibers, including 9×25mm Mauser for the Austrian Army. In Greece, the MP34 in 9×25mm Mauser was issued to mechanized police units; production of the ammunition there continued through German occupation.

The Steyr-Solothurn S17-100 was a direct-blowback submachine gun in 9×25mm Mauser that was intended to be mounted on a tripod or vehicle, but did not see wider adoption in the armed services. A rather unusual submachine gun with no stock, the S17-100 had a trigger with two grooves, the top being for semi-automatic fire and the bottom for fully automatic fire. While the design was quite different from the S1-100/MP-34, it had a similar barrel and bolt, and used the same magazines. In function, it was essentially a submachine gun with a more powerful cartridge that could be used as a squad automatic weapon. Only a few samples were made for testing and demonstration.

The M1923 Thompson, an early 1920s experimental military version of the Thompson submachine gun, was offered in this caliber, in addition to others.

Later iterations of the MP 18, such as the Haenel MP 28/II, were offered on the world market in this caliber, among others.

The Bergmann MP34/I and MP35/I were offered in 9×25mm Mauser in addition to other calibers.

SIG automatic carbine models MKMO, MKMS, MKPO and MKPS were produced in Switzerland from 1933 until 1942 with 9×25mm Mauser caliber as an option.

The Scotti OM 42 was an experimental Italian submachine gun in 9×25mm Mauser.

The Pál Király-designed Géppisztoly 39M and 43M in 9×25mm Mauser were produced by Danuvia in Hungary from 1939 through the end of World War II. These weapons remained in Hungarian service through the early 1950s. It has been suggested that special loading, similar to the aformenetioned 1940 Mauser proposal, may have been used for these.

== Reloading ==
Reloadable cartridge cases may be produced by resizing and trimming 9mm Winchester Magnum brass. A reasonable starting point for load development would be .38 ACP load data. The .38 Super data may possibly be more consistent with the original factory loading, as these had a claimed muzzle velocity of approximately 1,362 fps with a 128 gr bullet. The eighth edition of Cartridges of the World has a listing in the entry for 9mm Mauser using a 125 gr bullet with a heavier charge of Blue Dot powder than is normally listed as the maximum for 124 gr jacketed bullets in the .38 Super. Using old loading data using modern powders may result in more powerful loads than is intended. Excessively strong loads may crack the bolt stop in a Mauser pistol. Failure of this part due to weak recoil springs may cause the bolt to fly back out of the barrel extension into the shooter's face.

== See also ==
- 9 mm caliber
- List of handgun cartridges

== Sources ==
- Hogg, Ian German Handguns, p. 311, Greenhill Books, 2001
- Barnes, Frank C. CARTRIDGES OF THE WORLD 3rd Edition, 1972 Digest Books, ISBN 0-695-80326-3
- Kersten, Manfred; Moll, F.W.; Schmid, Walter C96 Geschichte und Modelle Vol. 2, 1904-1915, Service K,
- Moss, John L., "The 9 x 25 Mauser Export Cartridge," IAA Journal Issue 424, March/April 2002, pp. 6–20
- Nelson, Thomas B., The World's Submachine Guns (Machine Pistols) Volume I, International Small Arms Publishers, Cologne, 1963
