= MP 30 =

MP 30 or MP30 may refer to:

- MP30, a submachine gun
- Chattian, MP 30, a zone during the Oligocene
