= Degtyaryov machine gun =

Soviet light machine gun

DP machine gun
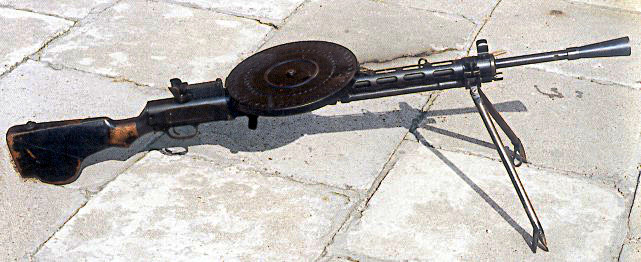
- DP-27
- Type: Light machine gun
- Place of origin: Soviet Union

Service history
- In service: 1928–present
- Used by: See Users
- Wars: Spanish Civil War; Winter War; World War II; Second Sino-Japanese War; Korean War; Chinese Civil War; First Indochina War; Vietnam War; Hungarian Revolution of 1956; Laotian Civil War; North Yemen Civil War; Cambodian Civil War; Cambodian-Vietnamese War; Rhodesian Bush War; Portuguese Colonial War; Communist insurgency in Thailand; Afghan Wars; Sino-Vietnamese War; Sri Lankan Civil War; First Nagorno-Karabakh War; Georgian Civil War; Yugoslav Wars; Somali Civil War; Iraq War; First Libyan Civil War; Northern Mali conflict Syrian Civil War; Russo-Ukrainian War

Production history
- Designer: Vasily Degtyaryov
- Designed: 1927
- Produced: 1928–1950s
- No. built: 795,000
- Variants: See Variants

Specifications
- Mass: 9.12 kg (20.11 lb) (unloaded); 11.5 kg (25 lb) (loaded)
- Length: 1,270 mm (50.0 in)
- Barrel length: 604 mm (23.8 in)
- Cartridge: 7.62×54mmR
- Caliber: 7.62 mm
- Action: Gas-operated, flapper locking
- Rate of fire: 550 rpm
- Muzzle velocity: 840 m/s (2,755 ft/s)
- Effective firing range: 800 m (874.9 yd)
- Feed system: 47-round pan magazine
- Sights: Adjustable iron sights, front post and rear notch on a scaled tangent

The Degtyaryov machine gun (Russian: Пулемёт Дегтярёва Пехотный (ПДП), romanized: Pulemyot Degtyaryova Pekhotny (PDP), lit. 'Degtyarev Infantry Machinegun' or DP-27/DP-28 is a light machine gun chambered in the 7.62×54mmR cartridge that was primarily used by the Soviet Union, with service trials starting in 1927, followed by general deployment in 1928.

Besides being the standard Soviet infantry light machine gun (LMG) during World War II, with various modifications it was used in aircraft as a flexible defensive weapon, and it was equipped on almost all Soviet tanks in World War II as either a flexible bow machine gun or a co-axial machine gun controlled by the gunner. It was improved in 1943 producing the DPM, but it was replaced in 1946 with the RP-46 which improved on the basic DP design by converting it to use belt feed. The DP machine gun was supplemented in the 1950s by the more modern RPD machine gun and entirely replaced in Soviet service by the general purpose PK machine gun in the 1960s.

== Service use ==
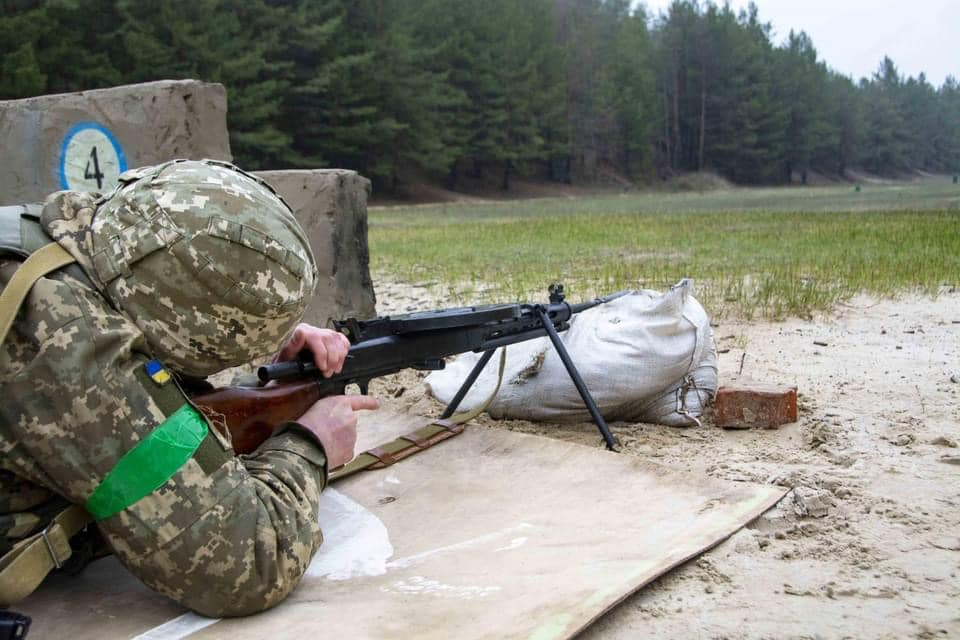
Ukrainian Territorial Defense Forces soldier training with a DPM machine gun during the Russian invasion of Ukraine

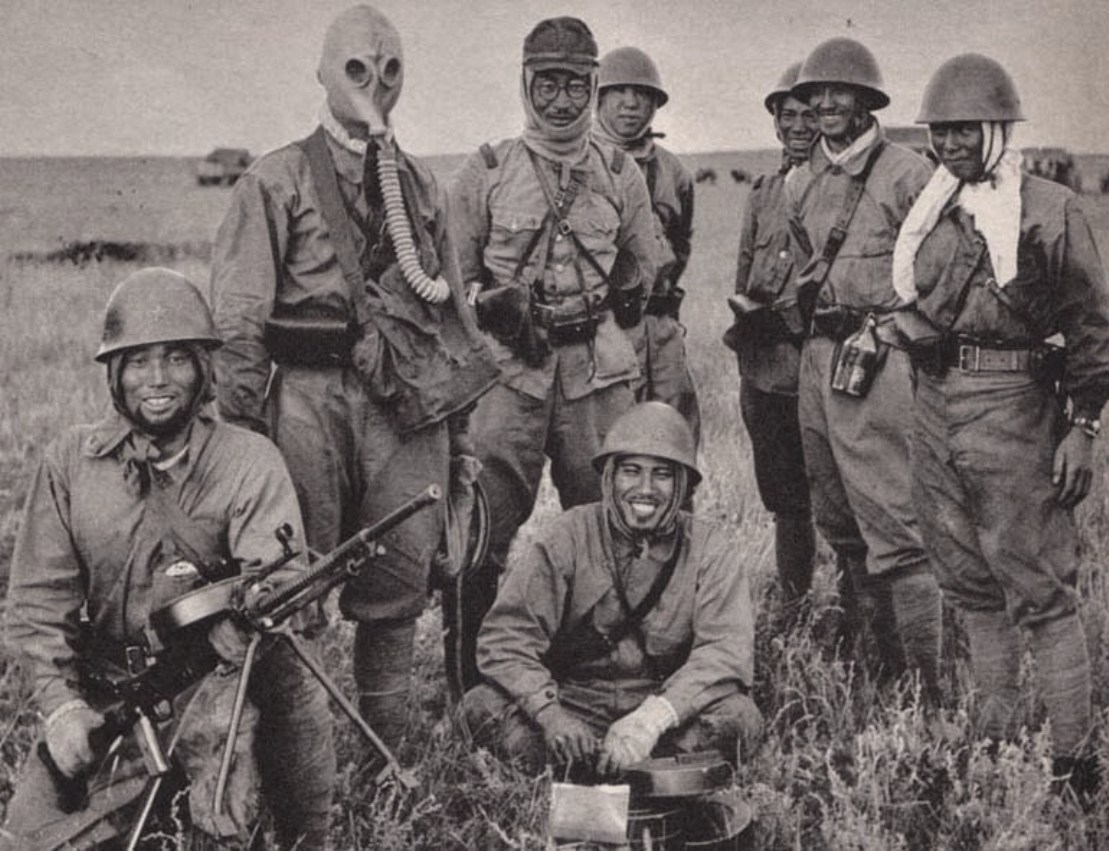
Japanese soldiers with captured Soviet equipment during the Battles of Khalkhin Gol. The bottom left soldier has a DT machine gun.

Despite its limitations, the DP had a reputation as a relatively effective light support weapon. It was nicknamed the "record player" (proigryvatel) by Red Army troops because of its rotating disc-shaped pan magazine.

The first uses of the DP-27 in war were with the Republican forces in the Spanish Civil War. On 25 October 1936, the SS Kursk docked at Cartegena, delivering 150 Degtaryov machine guns along with 9,000 Tsarist-era Winchester Model 1895 rifles. The Cabo Palos delivered 3 DT tank machine guns on 7 May 1937. On 7 February 1938, the SS Bonafacio arrived in Bassens and included numerous weapons in its cargo delivery, including DP and DT machine guns.

Many were captured by the Finnish Army in the Winter War and the Continuation War and partially replaced the Lahti-Saloranta M/26. The DP received the nickname Emma in Finnish service after a popular waltz, again due to the magazine's resemblance to a record player. In the summer of 1944, the Finnish army had about 3,400 Finnish-made Lahti-Salorantas and 9,000 captured Soviet-made Degtyarevs on the front. Captured examples were operated by the Volkssturm, the late-war German militia, and in German service the Degtyarev received the designation Leichtes Maschinengewehr 120(r).

The Chinese Nationalists received 5,600 DPs from the USSR and used them in the Second Sino-Japanese War and the Chinese Civil War. The North Korean and Chinese Communists used the DP in the Korean War and copied the DPM as the Type 53.

Examples of all variants of the DP machine gun were given or sold to the Viet Minh in the First Indochina War by the USSR and Chinese Communists. Similarly, in the Vietnam War to the NVA and Vietcong.

DPMs have also been recovered from Taliban fighters during the War in Afghanistan while DPs or DPMs have been spotted in 2014 in the Northern Mali conflict. During the 2022 Russian invasion of Ukraine, a few of the backline Ukrainian forces were issued surplus DPMs.

== System ==
The Degtyaryov light machine gun (DP) operates using a gas-operated mechanism and magazine-fed ammunition. The gas engine features a long-stroke piston and a gas regulator located under the barrel.

The barrel itself is quick-detachable, partially covered by a protective shroud, and equipped with a conical removable flash hider (early models lacked both a flash hider and threading for it). The barrel was prone to overheating during intensive fire: due to its thin walls, it would heat up quickly (especially in later models where ribbed radiators were omitted for simplicity), and thus short bursts were necessary to prevent disabling the gun (combat rate of fire was up to 80 rounds per minute). Replacing the barrel during combat was difficult—it required a special wrench to remove the lock and protect the hands from burns.

The bolt was locked using two locking lugs that spread sideways when the firing pin moved forward. Once the bolt reached the forward position, the bolt carrier continued moving, and the widened middle section of the firing pin, connected to it, pushed the rear ends of the locking lugs outward into the grooves of the receiver, securely locking the bolt. After firing, the bolt carrier moved backward under the action of the gas piston. During this, the firing pin was retracted, and special bevels on the carrier brought the locking lugs inward, disengaging them from the receiver and unlocking the bolt. The recoil-operating spring was located under the barrel and could lose elasticity when overheated during intense fire, which was one of the relatively few but significant disadvantages of the DP. Additionally, the locking lugs required precise fitting to achieve symmetrical locking (though this was not a major practical drawback).

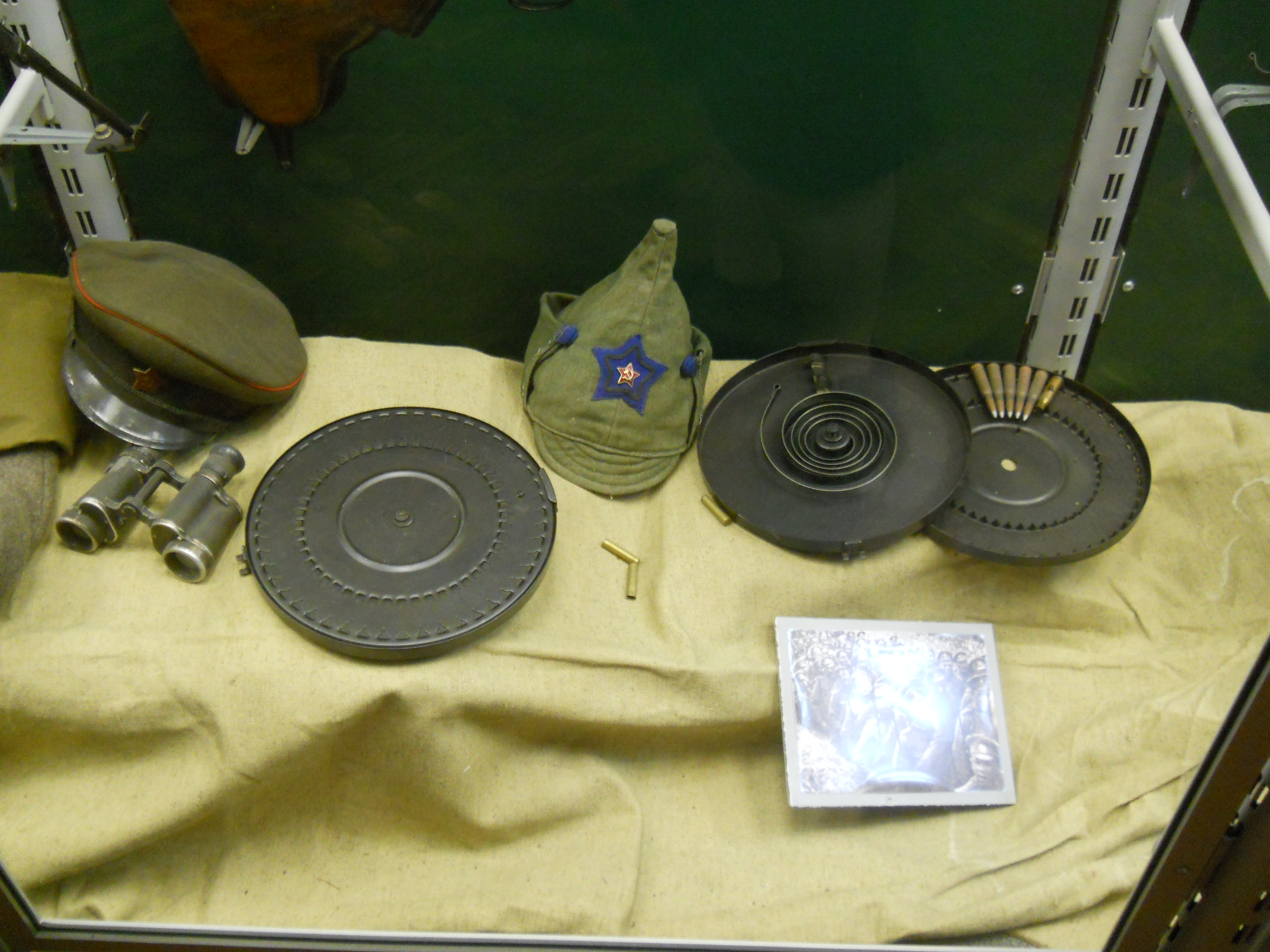
Cartridges were arranged in a circle, with bullets facing the center of the disk.

The weapon was fed by flat pan magazines—"platters"—in which cartridges were arranged in a circle with bullets facing the center. This design ensured reliable feeding of rimmed cartridges but had notable drawbacks: large size and weight of the empty magazine, difficulty in transport and reloading, and susceptibility to damage during combat due to deformation. Initial magazines held 49 rounds, later replaced by 47-round ones with improved reliability. The machine gun was issued with three magazines and a metal box for their transport.

Although the DP magazine externally resembled the magazine of the Lewis gun, its operating principle was entirely different; for example, in the Lewis gun, the disk rotated using energy from the bolt via a complex lever system, while in the DP, it was powered by a pre-tensioned spring inside the magazine.

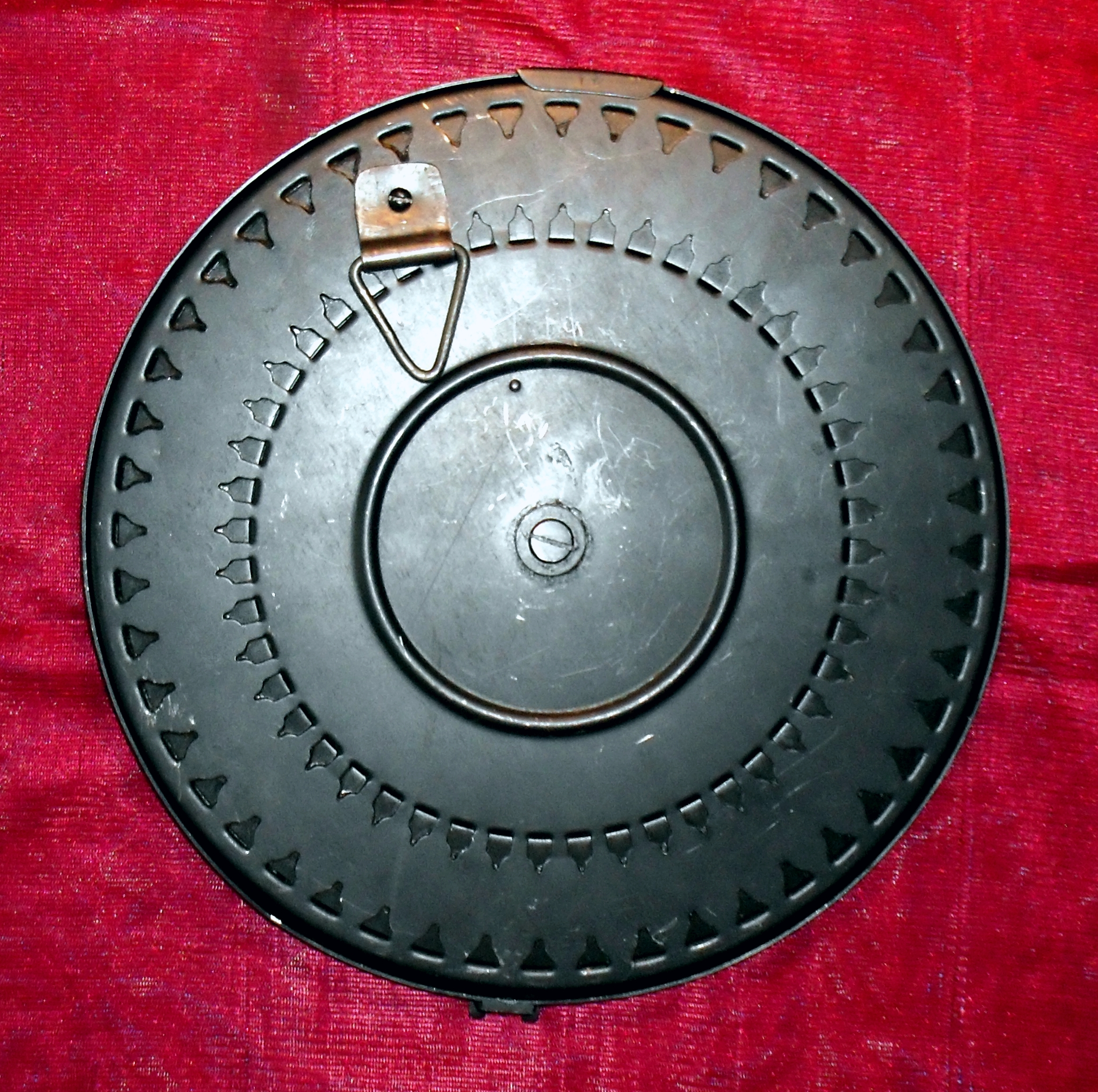
Top view of DP drum magazine

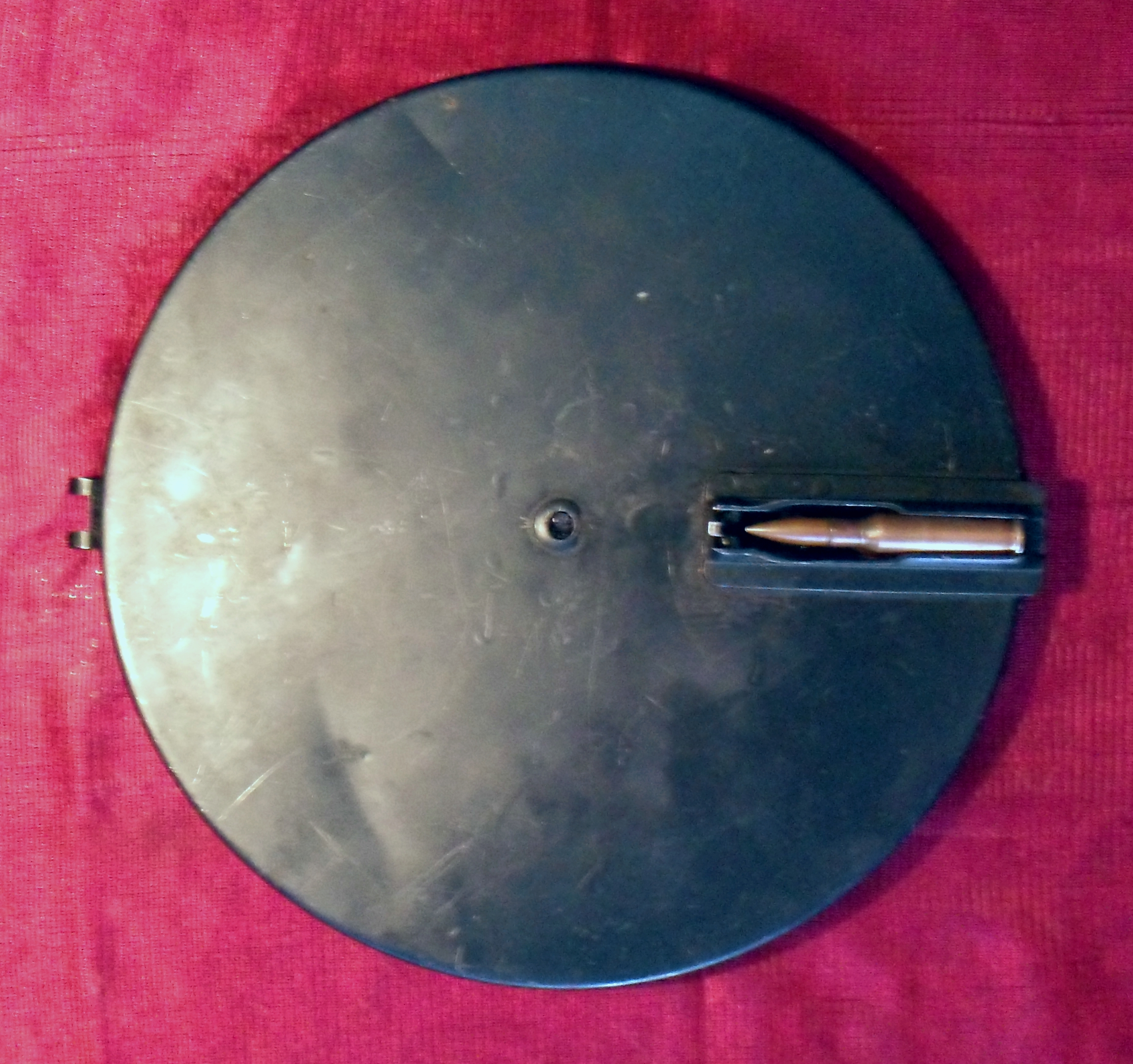
Bottom view of DP drum magazine

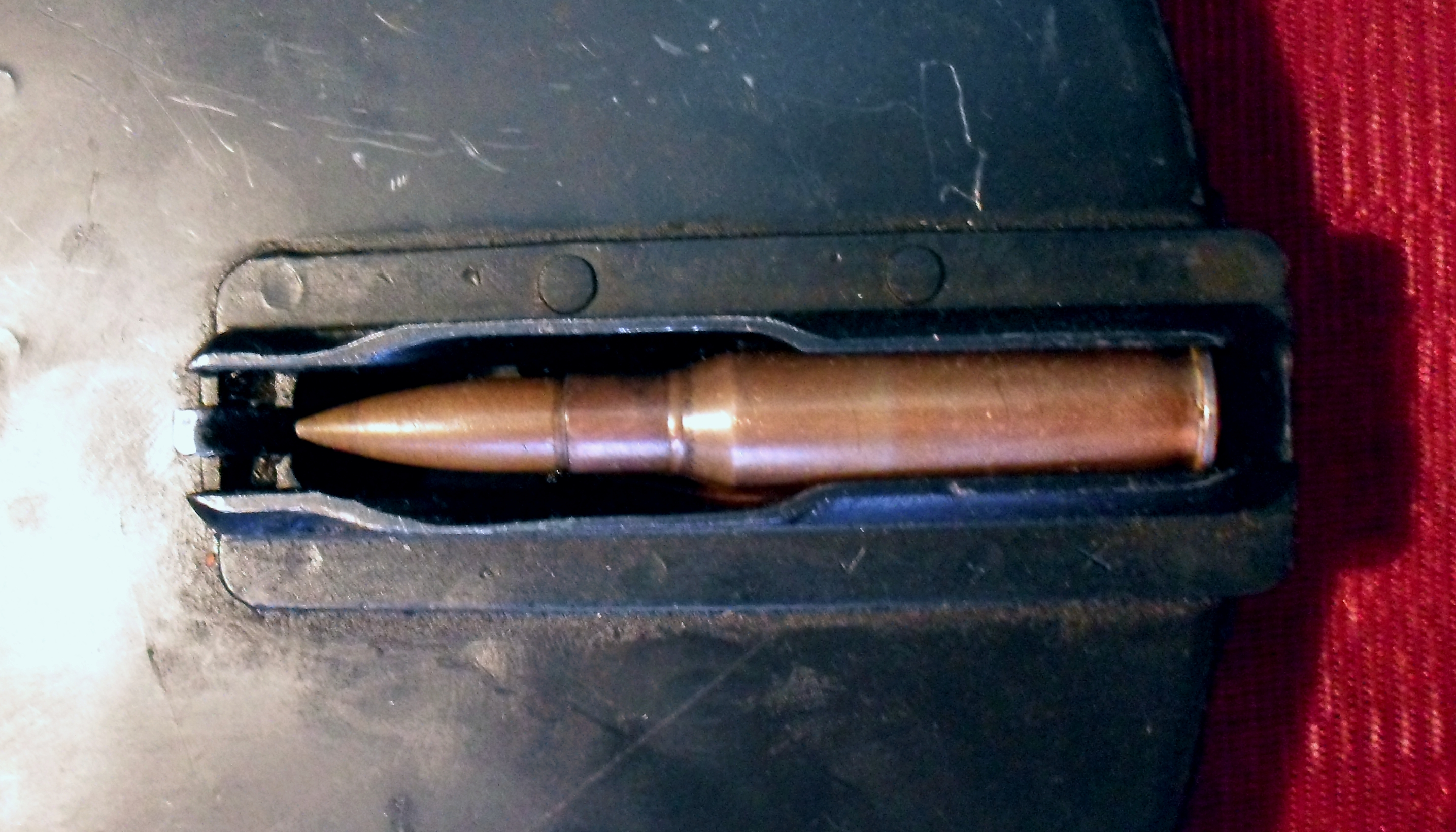
Magazine lips

The trigger mechanism allowed only fully automatic fire from an open bolt. It was housed in the trigger frame, attached to the receiver with a cross-pin. There was no conventional safety; instead, it had an automatic safety lever that disengaged when gripping the neck of the stock. During intense fire, the need to constantly press the safety lever tired the shooter, and the rifle-type stock did not aid in maintaining a firm grip during burst fire. The tank version, the DT, had a more successful trigger frame design, featuring a standard safety and a pistol grip. The upgraded version, the DPM, adopted a similar trigger frame. Interestingly, Finnish-modified DPs during overhaul were fitted with a manual safety in addition to the original automatic one.

The DP was fired using a detachable bipod, which was sometimes lost in the heat of battle due to insecure attachment or became loose, significantly reducing stability and ease of use. The DPM later adopted a fixed bipod. Spent casings were ejected downward.

=== Accessories ===
The machine gun's accessories include:

- a sectional cleaning rod for cleaning the barrel bore;
- a wrench-screwdriver for disassembly and assembly;
- a crank cleaning rod with a bristle brush for cleaning the chamber through the top receiver port without full disassembly;
- a gas path cleaning tool;
- two drifts for pushing out pins and dowels;
- an extractor for removing torn cartridge case necks.

All accessories were packed in a box-bag or a canvas pouch.

=== Sound Suppressor ===
At the end of 1941, the SG-DP (Special Sound Suppressor for the “DP” LMG), likely developed with I. G. Mitin's involvement, was created. It used low-charge rounds with light bullets, reaching a muzzle velocity of 330 m/s. The suppressor enabled silent automatic fire up to 300 m (with a lethal range of up to 500 m). It was adopted by the Red Army on 27 May 1942. In June 1942, Plant No. 2 of the NKVD in Kovrov planned to produce 500 units. The suppressor weighed 1.3 kg, and the overall length of the machine gun with it was 1,332 mm.

After testing in July 1942, the SG-DP was revised at Kovrov's OKB-2 by designers A. M. Marantsev and I. V. Dolgushev. The improved suppressor had a reduced inner diameter from 16 to 14.5 mm. It weighed 1.15 kg, had an 85 mm muzzle attachment, and an overall length of 291 mm.

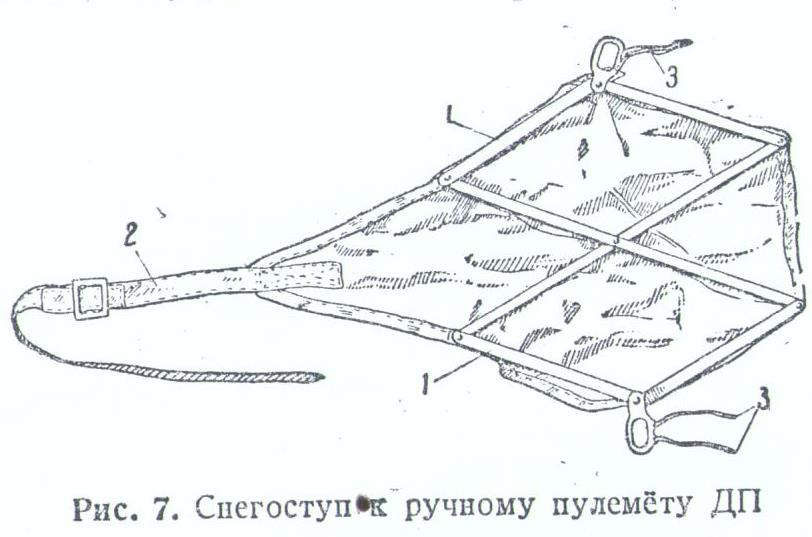
Snowshoe for the DP LMG

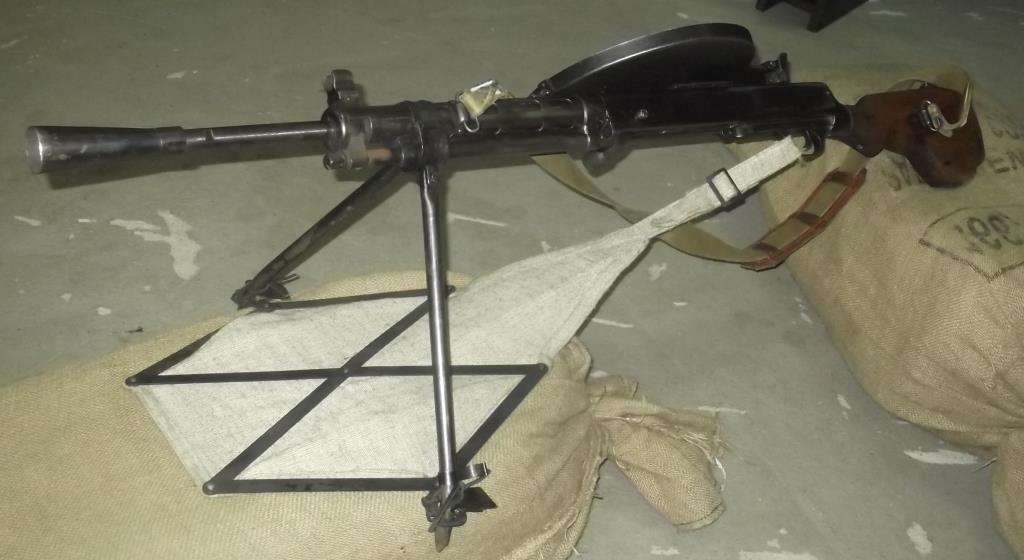
DP-27 with replica snowshoe

In late 1942, the suppressor was tested at the NIPSVO as the SG-42 (Special Suppressor Model 1942). It was presumably used at the front and mass-produced, although production volume is unknown. Postwar tests in February–March 1948 found the suppressors unreliable, and they were decommissioned.

Between 1948–1950, the suppressor was further developed into the KB-P-535 at OKB-2. It weighed 0.96 kg with obturators, measured 301 mm in length, 68 mm in height, and 34 mm in width. The DP with this suppressor measured 1,310 mm.

In March–April 1950, the KB-P-535 suppressors were tested with the RP-46 machine gun but again failed to meet requirements.

=== Snowshoe ===
Due to the legs of the machine gun sinking into snow or loose soil, various devices were developed, such as the snowshoe.

The snowshoe for the DP consists of metal plates hinged together with a stretched canvas fabric. Two of the plates, with eyelets and straps, are used to attach the bipod legs, while a canvas strap with buckle secures it to the trigger guard.

The snowshoe supports the DP during firing from deep snow, swampy, or sandy ground in summer.

Magazines and ammunition could also conveniently be placed on the snowshoe.

== Designation ==
The Degtyaryov machine gun was accepted for Red Army service in 1927 with the official designation 7,62-мм ручной пулемет обр. 1927 г (7.62mm Hand-Held Machine Gun Model 1927). It was called the ДП-27 (DP-27), although some western sources refer to it as the DP-28.

== Variants ==
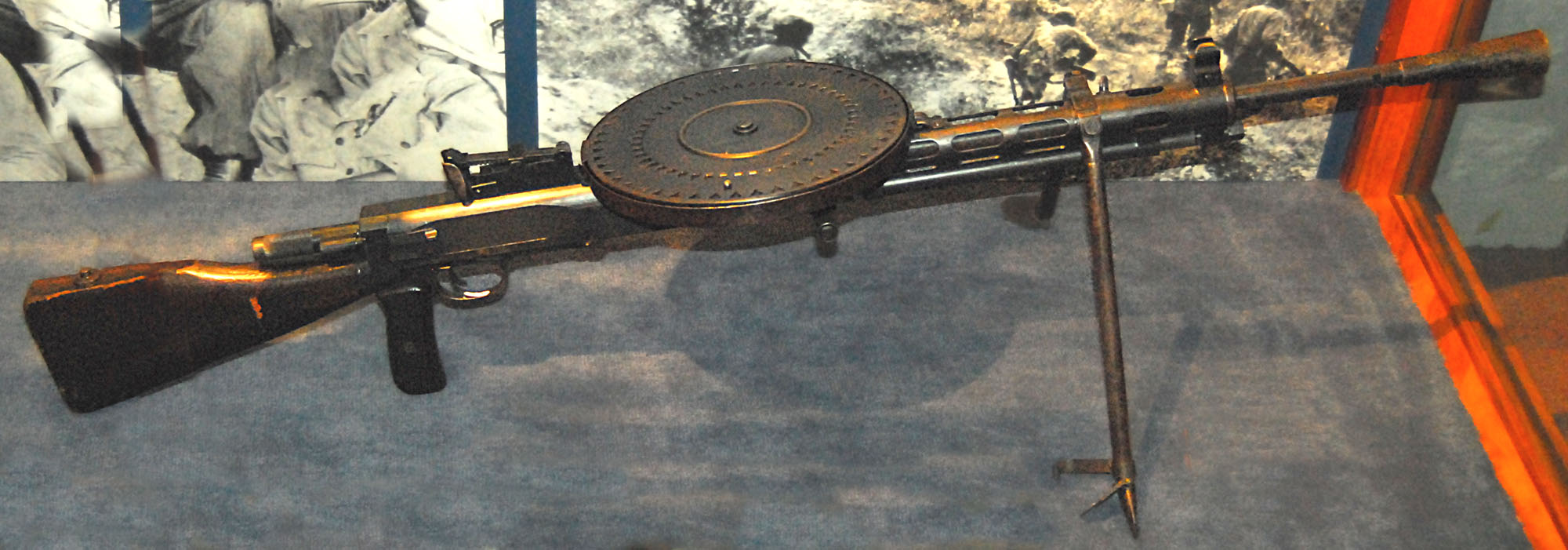
Chinese Type 53 (DPM)

- DPM, modernized version adopted in 1943–44, with a more robust bipod fastened to the cooling jacket and the recoil spring housed in a tube projecting from the rear of the receiver which necessitated a pistol grip for this model of the weapon (manufactured in China as the Type 53)
- DA, for mounting and loading in aircraft (Дегтярёва авиационный, Degtyaryova Aviatsionny; ДА). Also used in tandem mounts known as DA-2. Employed in the early versions of the Tupolev TB-3 bomber and in the Polikarpov R-5 and Polikarpov Po-2 army cooperation aircraft. The DA weighed 7.1 kg empty and 11.5 kg with standard ammunition load. Its rate of fire was 600 rounds per minute. It was built between 1928 and March 1930 with 1,200 units delivered. It was soon superseded by the ShKAS, which had a much higher rate of fire.
- DT and DTM, for mounting and loading in armoured fighting vehicles (Дегтярёва танковый, Degtyaryova Tankovy; ДТ and ДТМ)
- DTM-4, (ДТМ-4) quad mounted variant.

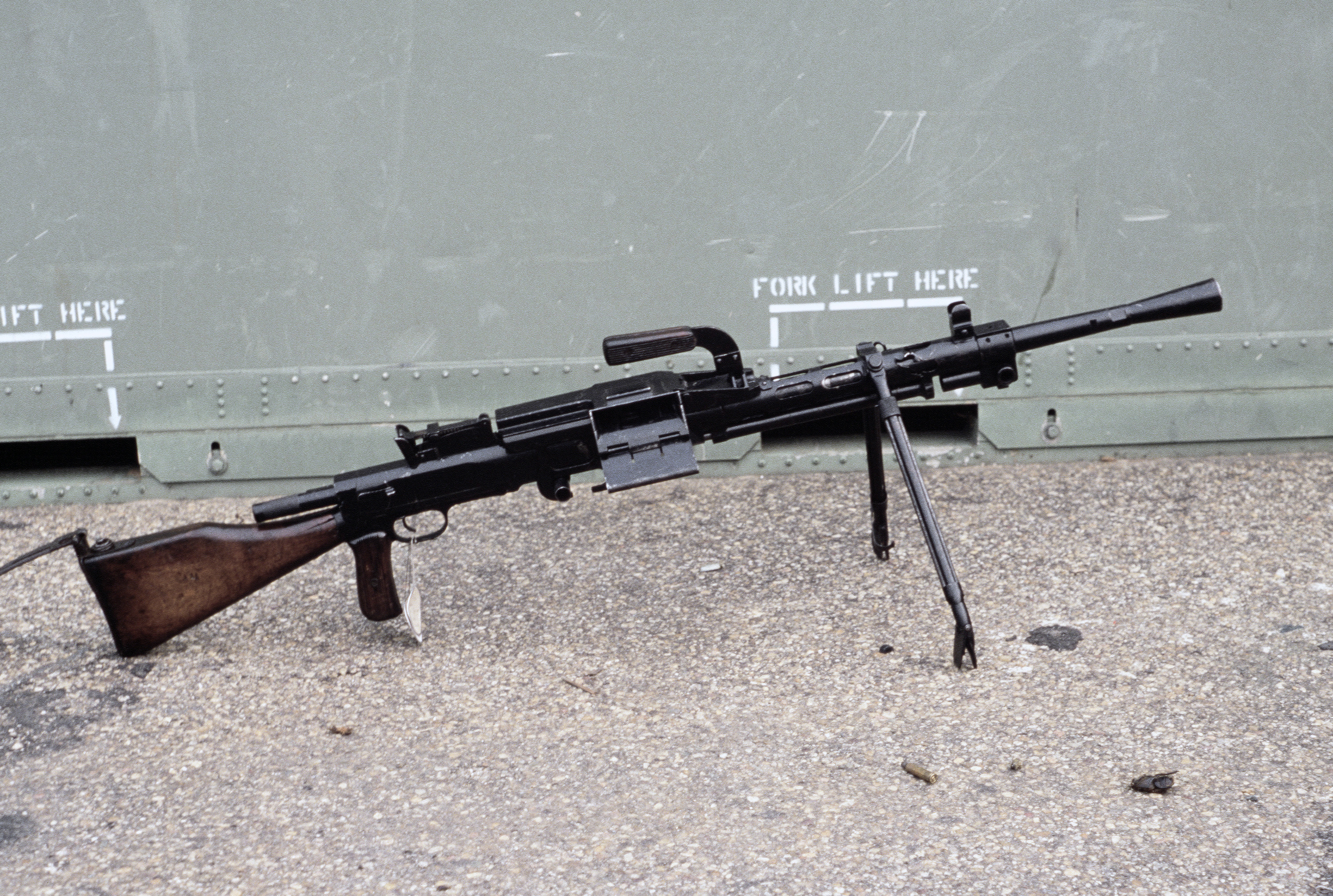
RP-46

- RP-46 (Ротный пулемет - company machine gun): metallic-belt fed version adopted in 1946 with a heavier barrel to allow prolonged sustained fire. About 500 rounds could be fired continuously before the barrel had to be swapped or allowed to cool down. Also had a user-adjustable gas system, with three holes of varying diameters provided, to cope with varying environmental conditions and residue buildup. Although the empty weight of the RP-46 exceeded that of DP by 2.5 kg, when considered together with a single ammo box of 250 rounds, the RP-46 weighed 10 kg less than the DP together with the same amount of ammunition in DP pans. The RP-46 remained in Soviet service for 15 years before it was replaced (together with the SGM) by the PK machine gun. The RP-46 was later manufactured in China as the Type 58 and in North Korea as the Type 64. The RP-46 could still fire from DP-style magazines by removing its belt-feeding system.

== Users ==
- Afghanistan: DPM and RP-46 variants
- Albania: RP-46 variant.
- Algeria: RP-46 variant.
- Angola: RP-46 variant.
- Benin: RP-46 variant.
- Bulgaria: RP-46 variant.
- Central African Republic: RP-46 variant.
- Republic of China: Received 5,600 from the Soviet Union as aid from 1938.
- China: DPM and RP-46 locally built as Type 53 and Type 58
- Comoros: RP-46 and Type 58 variants.
- Congo-Brazzaville: RP-46 variant.
- Cuba: DP, DT, DTM, DPM and RP-46 variants.
- Czechoslovakia: DP, DPM and RP-46 variants.
- Egypt
- Equatorial Guinea: RP-46 variant.
- Ethiopia: RP-46 variant.
- Finland: Used captured examples during World War II.
- East Germany: DT and DTM variants.
- Germany: Captured models were issued to the Volkssturm.
- Hungary: DP, DPM and DTM variants. Locally produced as M-27.
- Indonesia
- Iraq: Iraqi insurgents used RP-46 variant.
- Kingdom of Italy: The Italian Army in Russia used captured examples.
- Laos: RP-46 variant.
- Libya: RP-46 variant.
- Nigeria: RP-46 variant.
- North Korea: DPM, Type 53 and RP-46 variants.
- PAIGC
- Palestine Liberation Organization
- Poland: Used by Polish Army in USSR during World War II and then during the Cold War era (DPM and RP-46 variants).
- Romania: DP and DPM used after the war.
- Seychelles: RP-46 variant.
- Somalia: RP-46 variant.
- Soviet Union
- Spanish Republic
- Sri Lanka: Type 58 variant
- Sudan: RP-46 variant.
- Syria: RP-46 variant.
- Syrian opposition: Regular DP27. Used by the Martyrs Of Islam rebel faction.
- Tanzania: RP-46 variant.
- Togo: RP-46 variant.
- Ukraine
- Vietnam: DPM, Type 53, RP-46 and Type 58 variants
- Yemen
- Yugoslavia
- Zambia: RP-46 variant.

== See also ==
- Kucher Model K1
- Lahti-Saloranta M/26
- Lewis gun
- List of Russian weaponry
