= Danuvia =

Hungarian arms and motorcycle manufacturing company

- Industry: Manufacturing
- Founded: 4 June 1920
- Defunct: 1998; 28 years ago
- Fate: Dissolved
- Headquarters: Budapest, Hungary
- Area served: Worldwide
- Products: Small arms, machinery, motorcycles

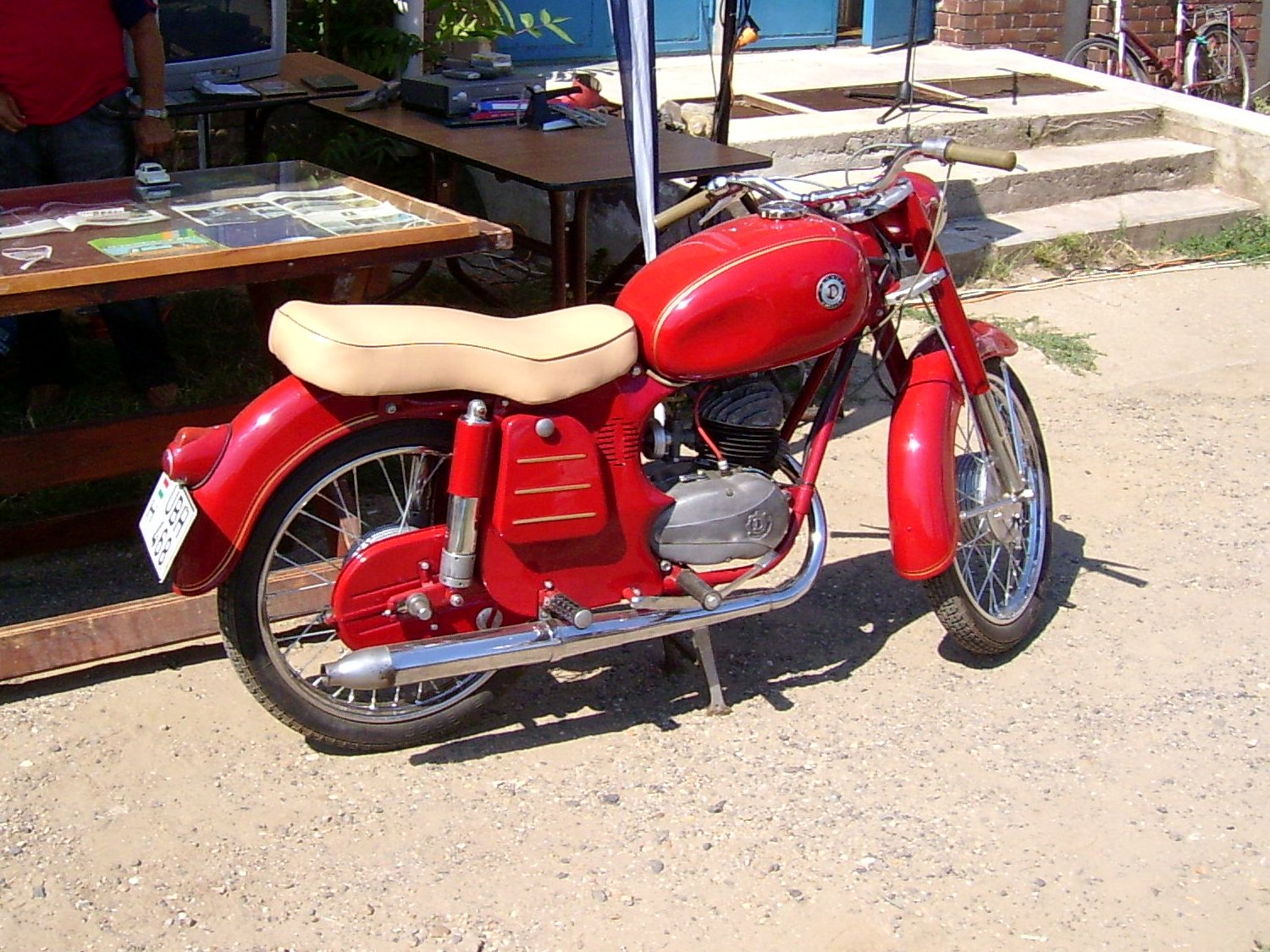
Danuvia DV 125

Danuvia, known fully as Danuvia Engineering Industries Rt. (Hungarian: Danuvia Gépgyár, lit. Danuvia Machinery Factory), was a Hungarian manufacturer founded in 1920 that produced firearms, munitions, machine tools and motorcycles for the Central and Eastern European armies and markets.

== History ==
Danuvia was founded on June 4, 1920, by the Hungarian government as an alternative to Fegyver- és Gépgyár, to produce arms for the Royal Hungarian Army and the Hungarian People's Army over the 20th century in discretion of oversight by the Military Inter-Allied Commission of Control, particularly during the interwar period and World War II. Hungary at the time was under treaty following the defeat and dissolution of Austria-Hungary as a result of the Treaty of Trianon from World War I, thus the company was originally given the title of Danuvia Külkereskedelmi Rt, lit. Danuvia Foreign Trade Co, and declared a foreign trading company to circumvent the restrictions on military rearmament following the treaty's signature.

In 1938, Hungarian prime minister Kálmán Darányi announced the Győr armament program, aiming to modernise the equipment and arms of the Royal Hungarian Army. In 1940, Danuvia operated and owned the Magyar Lőszerművek (lit. Hungarian Ammunition Works) factory in Veszprém to service this new demand. During World War II, Hungary purchased the licensing rights to various German and other foreign weapons, which were produced at the Danuvia factories. In 1944, Production from the Danuvia factories were largely halted due to the advancement of the Red Army. Following World War II underneath the jurisdiction of the Soviet Union, Hungarian arms development efforts declined under Soviet efforts for military standardization and preferential treatment for Soviet weaponry by the Hungarian Communist Party General Secretary Mátyás Rákosi, such as the mass-produced PPSh-41.

From 1954 to 1966, Danuvia also manufactured motorcycles. The Danuvia factories were based in the Zugló district of Budapest, on Angol utca ("English Street"). Danuvia was eventually disbanded in 1998, selling off intellectual property for their products to companies such as Intermodul Weapon Shops.

== Products ==
During the weapon manufacturing era of Danuvia, the company employed several notable Hungarian firearms designers, including Pál Király, the inventor of the Danuvia 39.M and Danuvia 43M submachine guns, József Kucher, the inventor of the Danuvia M53 K1 submachine gun, and Róbert Vörös, the inventor of the Danuvia VD-01 pistol. Additionally, it was the manufacturer of the Danuvia brand of motorcycles from 1954 to 1966.

=== Firearms ===
- FÈG 35M (possibly)
- 31.M Golyószóro
- Danuvia/Király 39M
- Danuvia/Király 39 a.M
- Danuvia/Király 43M
- Danuvia/Király 44M (prototype)
- 7.62mm Géppisztoly 48.Minta
- Danuvia/Király 50M (conversion of 43M)
- Kucher K1 SMG
- Kucher K1 MG
- Danuvia VD-01
