= Danuvia 43M submachine gun =

Danuvia 39M/43M
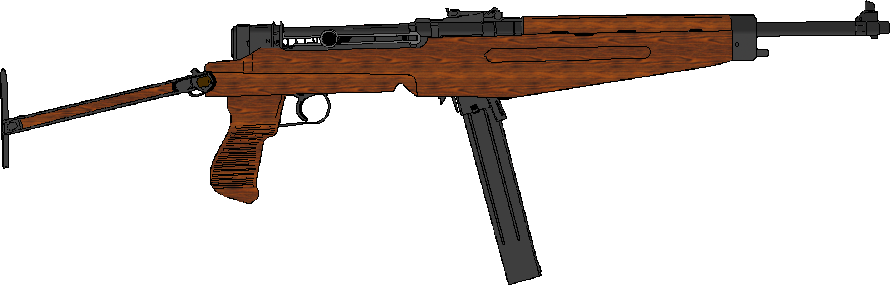
- Danuvia 43M
- Type: Submachine gun
- Place of origin: Hungary

Service history
- In service: 1939 to 1950s
- Wars: World War II; Hungarian Revolution of 1956

Production history
- Designer: Pál Király
- Designed: 1930s
- Manufacturer: Danuvia
- Produced: 1939–1944
- No. built: 39M: 13,332- ~15,000; 39/AM: 276; 43M: ~6000- ~8000; 44M: few trials guns 50M: unknown number converted from 43M (likely around 20,000 of all)

Specifications
- Mass: 39M: 3.7 kg (8 lb 3 oz) without magazine 4.4 kg (9 lb 11 oz) with magazine 43M: 3.63 kg (8 lb 0 oz) without magazine 4.2 kg (9 lb 4 oz) with magazine
- Length: 39M: 1,048 mm (41.3 in); 43M: 956 mm (37.6 in) butt extended 749 mm (29.5 in) butt retracted
- Barrel length: 39M: 499 mm (19.6 in); 43M: 424 mm (16.7 in)
- Cartridge: 9×25mm Mauser 39M and 43M; 9x19mm Parabellum 44M; 7.62 Tokarev 50M
- Action: Lever-delayed blowback
- Rate of fire: 730–780 rpm cyclic
- Muzzle velocity: 39M: 450 m/s (1,500 ft/s); 43M: 442 m/s (1,450 ft/s)
- Feed system: 40 round detachable box magazine

The Danuvia/Király submachine guns were Hungarian submachine guns designed by Pál Király in the late 1930s and used during World War II and the 1950s.

== History ==
The 9×25mm Danuvia submachine gun was designed by Hungarian engineer Pál Király in the late 1930s, and was produced by the titular Danuvia company. The guns were issued to Hungarian army troops in 1939 and remained in service throughout World War II and until the early 1950s. Tens of thousends (likely 20,000) were made between 1939 and 1944, according to the Hadtörténeti Intézet és Múzeum(hu). The Danuvia was a large, sturdy weapon, similar to a carbine. Inspired by the SIG MKMS, the Danuvia used the more powerful 9×25mm Mauser round, and incorporated lever-delayed blowback in order to better manage this high energy cartridge. The Danuvia's magazine can be folded forward into a recess in the stock where a plate then slides over it.

The gun was well-liked by troops it was issued to; it reportedly functioned well in the sub-zero, muddy conditions on the Eastern Front. The only difficulty was the availability of 9×25mm Mauser ammunition. It was used by the Hungarian army, military police and police forces and stayed in service until the early 1950s when it was gradually replaced by the PPSh-41 and the Kucher K1.

== Design ==
The Danuvia featured a patented two-part lever-delayed blowback bolt. The fire selector switch is a circular cap on the rear of the receiver and is rotated to one of three settings: E (Egyes)(semiautomatic fire), S(Sorozat) (full automatic), or Z (Zárt)(the safety setting). The ejection port and cocking handle are on the right side of the receiver. It had a ramp-type rear sight above the ejection port and a post foresight at end of the barrel.

== Variants ==
=== Géppisztoly 39M ===
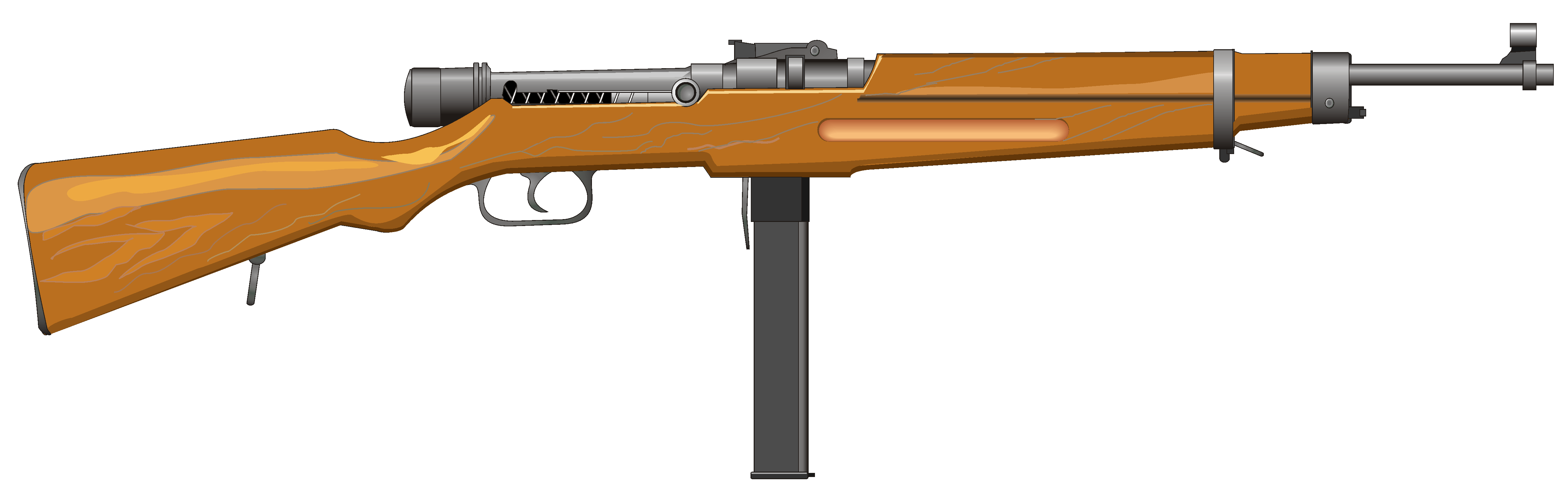
A illustration of a 39M

The original Danuvia was the Géppisztoly (Submachine gun) 39M which had a fixed full length wooden stock a vertical magazine that holds 40 rounds and is designed to look like the 35M rifle due to complaints from Gendarmes and has a bayonet lug.

=== Géppisztoly 39/AM ===
Paratroopers found the size and length of the 39M to long, because of this 276 39Ms were made with folding wooden buttstocks, similar to some Type 100 SMGs modified also for use with paratroopers.

=== Géppisztoly 43M ===
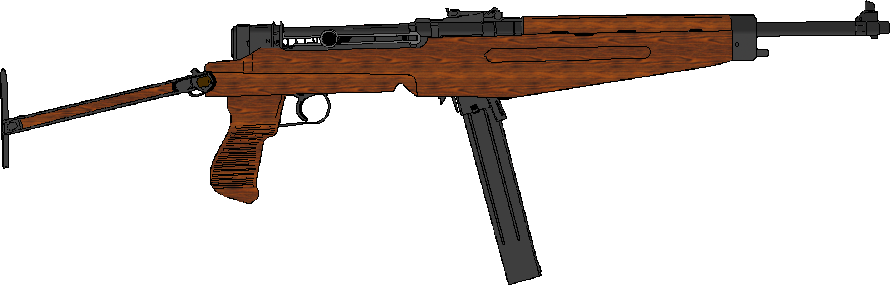
A illustration of the 43M

In 1943 a new version with a forward folding metal stock, wood fore stock and a pistol grip was designated the Géppisztoly 43M. The 43M was the most produced version and had a shortened barrel and a forward-angled magazine containing 40 rounds.

=== Géppisztoly 44M ===
In 1944 the 44M was developed as a simplified 9x19 Parabellum improvement over the 43M, it removed the toggle locking action in favour of a straight blowback action, however very few were made due to the Soviet invasion of Hungary. It would later serve as the main inspiration for the Kucher K1.

=== Géppisztoly 50M ===
The 50M was made to repurpose old 43Ms still in storage by cutting them down, giving them a new barrel shroud and rechambering them to 7.62 Tokarev. They were used by guard personal and police and notebly not by the Army, some of these likely saw combat in the 1956 revolution in Hungary.

== Users ==
- Hungary
  - Kingdom of Hungary (1920–1946) Starting in 1939 the gendarmerie and police would use the 39M, in 1942 the army would also begin to use the 39M aswell as the 39AM and 43M.
  - Hungarian People's Republic Mainly the 50M for guard personal, some 43Ms may have also been used before being converted.
- Nazi Germany Very limited use of 39M and 43M
- Soviet Union Limited use of both the 39M and 43M captured by troops in the field.

=== Non state Users ===
- Ukrainian Insurgent Army Fairly limited use of captured examples.

== Gallery ==
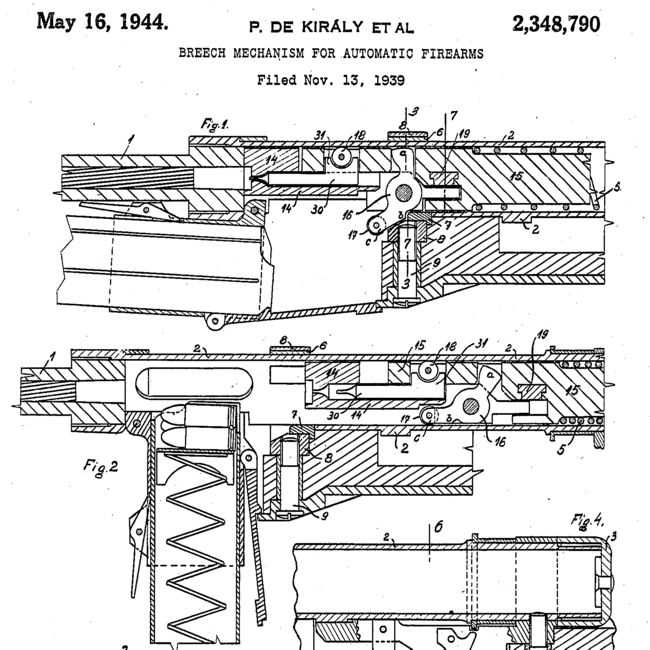
Screenshot of the patent for the Danuvia 39M

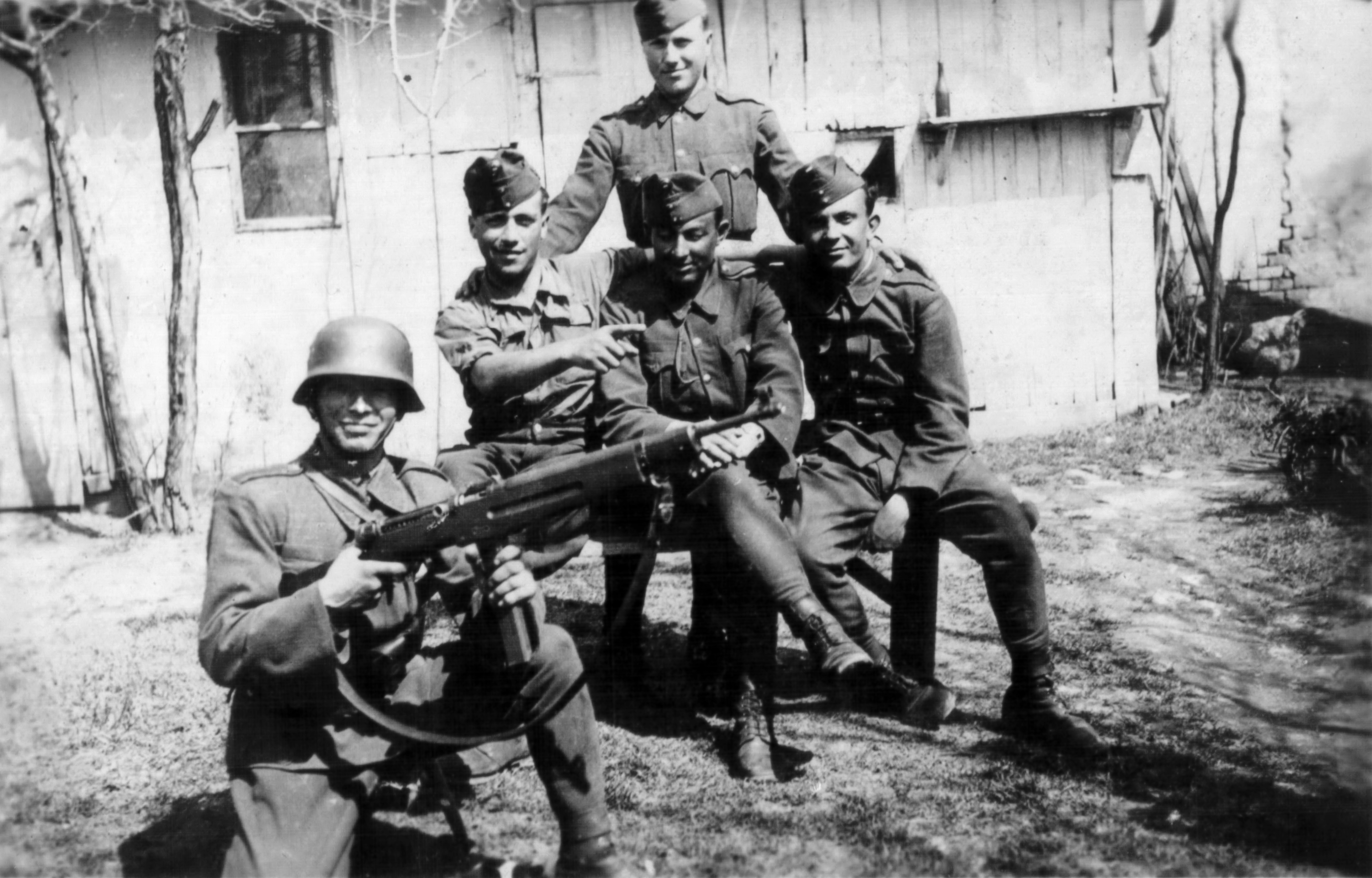
Hungarian soldiers in 1944, one of them is armed with a Danuvia 39M

A group of Ukrainian Insurgents, a 43M is seen being used by one of the insurgents.
