= SIG KE7 =

Swiss light machine gun

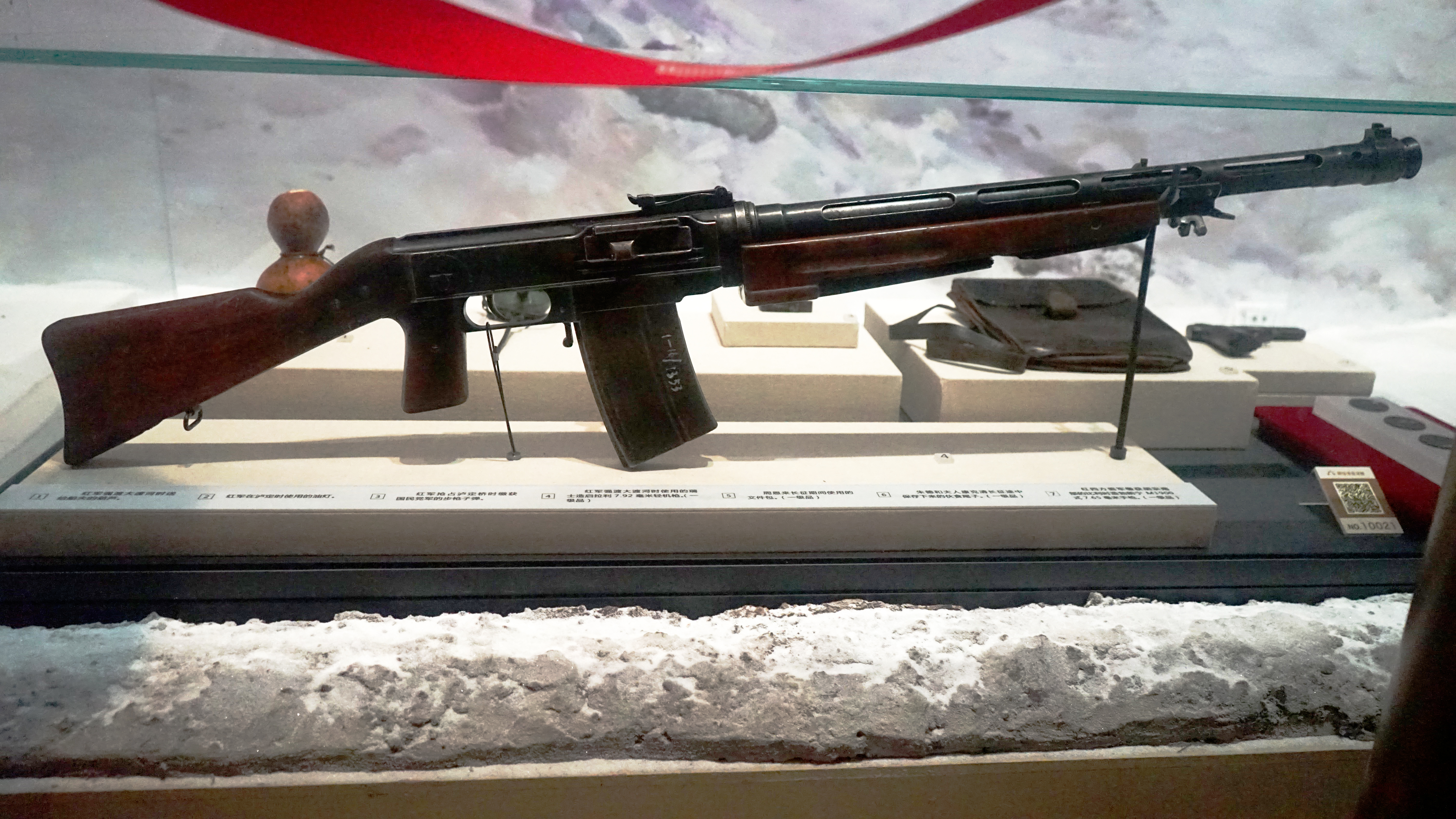
- Type: Light machine gun
- Place of origin: Switzerland

Service history
- In service: 1929
- Used by: See Users
- Wars: Chinese Civil War; Second Italo-Ethiopian War; Spanish Civil War; Second Sino-Japanese War; Korean War; Cuban Revolution

Production history
- Manufacturer: SIG
- Produced: 1929-1938

Specifications
- Mass: 8.2 kg
- Length: 1,190 mm
- Barrel length: 600 mm
- Crew: 2, firer and magazine/barrel changer
- Cartridge: 7×57mm Mauser; 7.65×53mm Mauser; 7.92×57mm Mauser
- Action: Recoil-operated
- Rate of fire: 550 rounds/minute
- Feed system: 25 round box magazine
- Sights: Iron

The SIG KE7 is a light machine gun designed and manufactured in Switzerland in the decade before the Second World War. Although exported, it was never used by the Swiss Army.

== Description ==
The SIG KE7 is a recoil operated, air cooled light machine gun with tilting bolt. It is fed from a curved box magazine mounted on the underside of the weapon, which holds 25 rounds. A light folding bipod is attached to the perforated barrel jacket, and an additional rear monopod can be fitted.

Notable feature of the gun is a very long travel of the bolt carrier (about 6 cm, 2.4 in) before it starts pulling the bolt back and extracting the fired case. It gives longer time for the pressure in barrel to drop for easier extraction.

== History ==
The KE7 light machine gun was designed by Pál Király and Gotthard End at the SIG small arms factory in Neuhausen am Rheinfall. Production commenced in 1929, with most weapons being exported to the Republic of China chambered for 7.92×57mm Mauser ammunition. The Chinese government purchased 3,025 from Switzerland between 1928 and 1939, and the provincial government of Guangdong purchased 200 KE7s with 4,000 magazines in December 1928. In 1933, Liu Xiang funded Huaxing Machine Works' acquisition of machinery for a workshop in Chongqing. From 1933 to 1936, it would produce 6,000 KE7 copies. Three months after the war with Japan began, the workshop would be requisitioned by the Chinese government and produce ZB-26 copies after 1939.

The KE7 would be used during the Chinese Civil War, the Second Sino-Japanese War and the Korean War. Some KE-7 machine guns were also made in other calibres for export to Latin America and Ethiopia. In 1930, examples were provided for trials being run by the British Army to find a replacement for the Lewis gun, although a modified ZB vz. 26 was finally adopted as the Bren gun.

== Users ==
- Argentina: In 7.65×53mm Mauser
- Brazil: In 7×57mm Mauser
- Bolivia: In 7.65x53 mm Mauser
- Republic of China: Used at least 3,225 original and 6,000 domestically made examples.
- China: Captured from ROC force during the Chinese Civil War.
- Cuba: Used by guerillas during the Cuban Revolution
- Ethiopian Empire: In 7.92×57mm Mauser
- Mexico: In 7×57mm Mauser
- Spain
- Uruguay: In 7×57mm Mauser
