= Calico Light Weapons Systems =

Defunct American manufacturing company

Calico Light Weapons Inc
- Type: Private
- Industry: Firearms
- Founded: October 1982
- Defunct: 2024
- Headquarters: Elgin, Oregon, U.S.
- Area served: Worldwide
- Products: Firearms, Magazines, Speed loaders, other firearm accessories
- Website: www.calicolightweaponsystems.com

Calico Light Weapons Inc. (CLWS) was an American privately held manufacturing company based in Elgin, Oregon, that designed, developed and manufactured semiautomatic firearms. It was established in 1982 in Bakersfield, California, and released its first production weapon in 1985. In 1998 operations were moved to Sparks, Nevada, where replacement parts for existing weapons were produced.

In 2006, it was sold once again and moved to Hillsboro, Oregon, where full firearm production resumed. It implemented a CNC machining process and upgraded materials used in manufacture. There were also minor redesigns of some production models to increase durability and reliability.

The company went out of business in 2024.

== Projects and operations ==
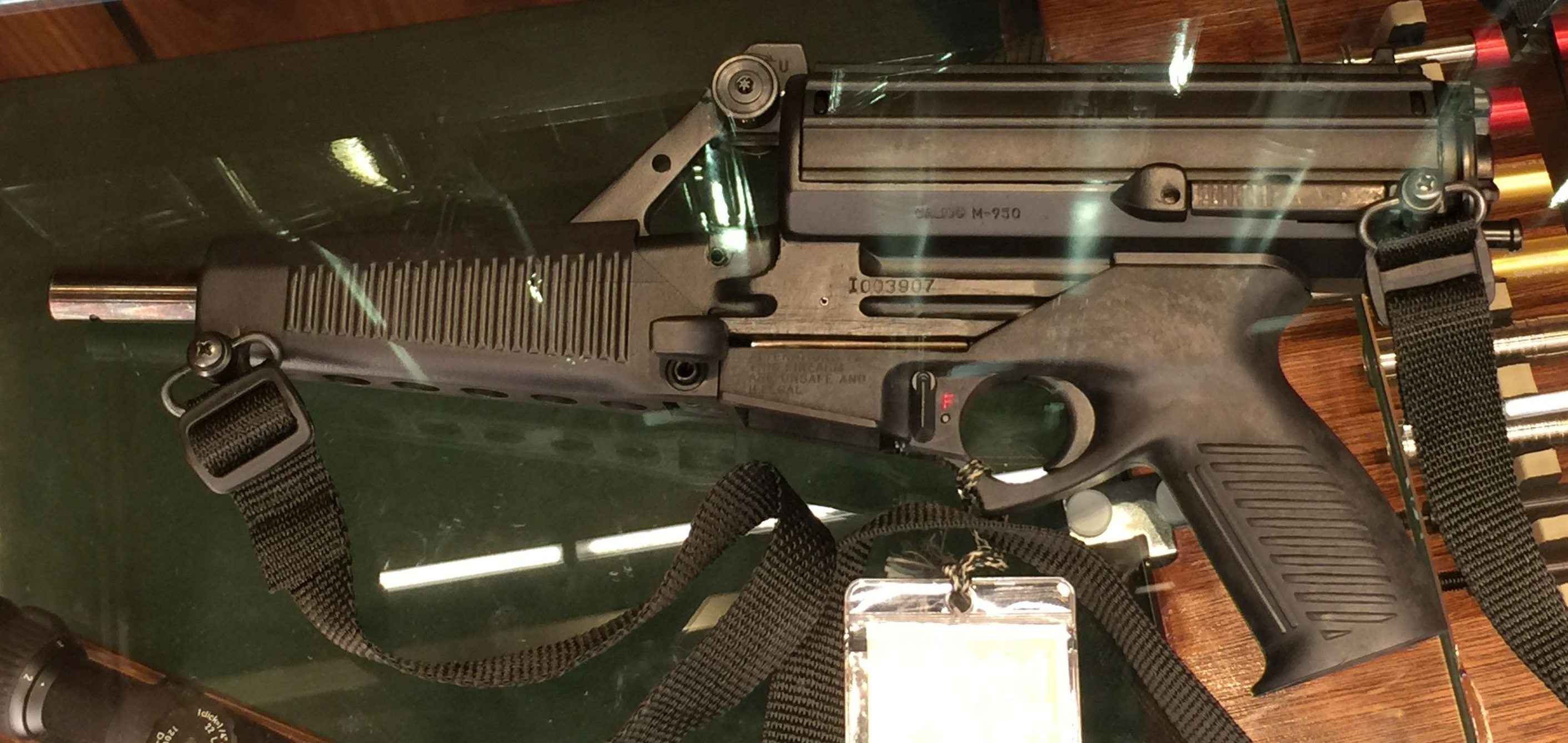
Calico M950

Calico was one of the largest manufacturers of large (50- and 100-round) magazines for automatic and semi-automatic weapons in 2011.

CLWS produced a line of pistols and pistol-caliber carbines that feature a top-mounted helical-feed 50- or 100-round magazine that ejects spent shells from a bottom port, making a brass catcher practical in various situations. Nine millimeter pistols, carbines and submachine guns use the roller-delayed blowback principle used in the Heckler & Koch series of firearms.

The Calico M950 is a pistol manufactured in the United States. Its main feature, along with all the other guns of the Calico system, is to feed from a proprietary helical magazine mounted on top, available in a 50 or 100-round capacity. The factory sights enable accuracy to about 60 meters (197 feet).

The Calico Liberty is a roller-delayed blowback-operated semi-automatic rifle (Liberty II) or pistol (Liberty III) chambered for the 9 mm Parabellum. These firearms use an unusual 50- or 100-round helical magazine that allow for a large number of rounds in a relatively compact and convenient package. The spent cartridges are discharged in an unusual fashion as well: downward, ahead of the trigger guard. This makes it relatively easy to fit an effective device to catch the cartridge cases, which can then be reloaded. A full-automatic (machine gun) version was available for military, police, and other government agencies.

At the 2012 SHOT Show, Calico exhibited a prototype 12-gauge shotgun with top-mounted helical magazine.

== Products ==
Current

- .22 LR pistols
  - Calico M110
- .22 LR rifles
  - Calico M100S and M-100 tactical
  - M-100FS and M-100FS tactical
- 9 mm pistols
  - Calico Liberty III and Liberty III tactical
- 9 mm rifles
  - Liberty I and II
  - Liberty I and II tactical
  - Calico M960 (Military and law enforcement only)
  - Calico M960A

Discontinued

- .22 LR pistols
  - M-100P
- 9 mm pistols
  - M950
- Carbines
  - M-900
  - M-951
- Sub-machineguns
  - M-750
  - M-900A
  - M-950A

Cancelled

- Shotgun
  - Calico 12-gauge shotgun

== See also ==
- List of companies based in Oregon
- PP-19 Bizon
