= MP 34 =

Austrian submachine gun

Maschinenpistole 34 (MP34)
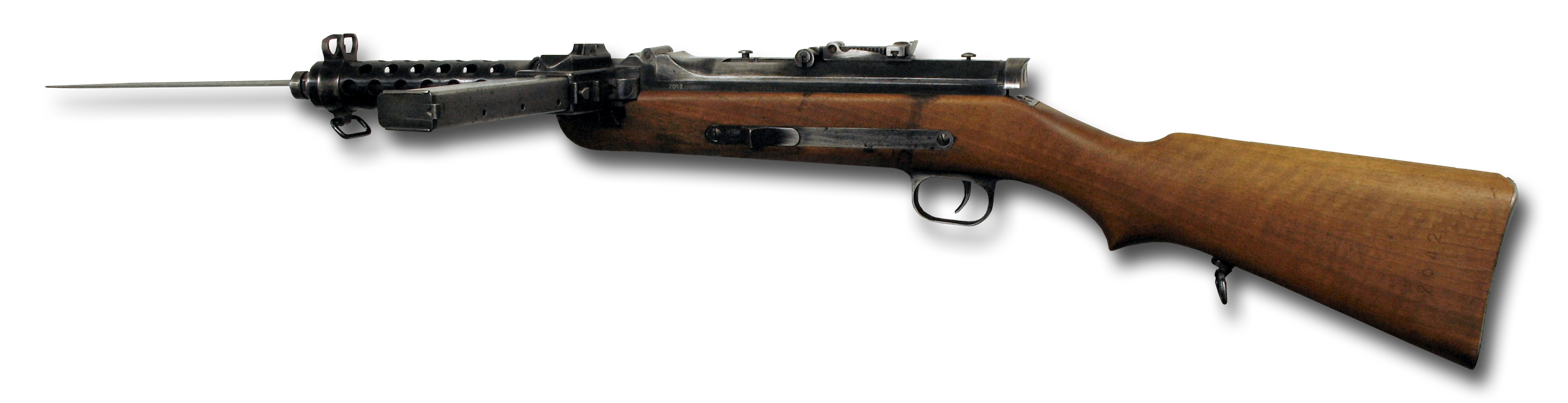
- MP34 SMG with bayonet attached
- Type: Submachine gun
- Place of origin: Austria

Service history
- In service: 1930–1970s
- Used by: See Users
- Wars: Chaco War; Spanish Civil War; World War II; Ecuadorian–Peruvian War; Bolivian National Revolution; Vietnam War; Portuguese Colonial War

Production history
- Designer: Louis Stange
- Designed: 1929
- Manufacturer: Waffenfabrik Steyr
- Produced: 1929–1940
- Variants: S1-100, MP30

Specifications
- Mass: Loaded 4.48 kg (9.9 lb); Unloaded 4.25 kg (9.4 lb)
- Length: 850 mm (33.5 in)
- Barrel length: 200 mm (7.9 in)
- Cartridge: 9×19mm Luger Parabellum; 9×23 Steyr; 9×25mm Mauser; 7.63×25mm Mauser; .45 ACP; 7.65×21mm Parabellum
- Action: open bolt blowback
- Rate of fire: ~600 rounds/min
- Muzzle velocity: ~410 m/s (1,345 ft/s)
- Effective firing range: 150–200 m (490–650 ft : 160–220 yds)
- Feed system: 20 or 32-round detachable box magazine
- Sights: Hooded or open topped front, adjustable rear

The MP34 (Maschinenpistole 34, literally "Machine Pistol 34") is a submachine gun (SMG) that was manufactured by Waffenfabrik Steyr as Steyr-Solothurn S1-100 and used by the Austrian Army and Austrian Gendarmerie and subsequently by units of the German Army and the Waffen-SS in World War II. An exceptionally well-made weapon, it was used by some forces well into the 1970s.

== History ==
The MP 34 was based on a design for the MP 19 by the Rheinmetall company based in Düsseldorf. The weapon is similar in design to the MP 18 Bergmann, which itself saw service towards the end of World War I.

To circumvent the conditions of Treaty of Versailles, precluding Germany from exporting weapons and munitions, Rheinmetall acquired the Swiss company Waffenfabrik Solothurn in 1929 and began secret production of a prototype. What was to become the MP 34 was originally designated ‘S1-100’ using the company's standard naming convention.

Due to the Solothurn company being unsuited for mass production, Rheinmetall took a controlling interest in Waffenfabrik Steyr, an established arms manufacturer in Austria. Weapons manufactured by Steyr were sold via the Zürich-based trade company Steyr-Solothurn Waffen AG to both the commercial and military markets.

The MP 34 was manufactured from the very best materials available at the time, and finished to the highest possible standard; it was so well manufactured that it has often been nicknamed the "Rolls-Royce of submachine guns". However, its production costs were extremely high as a consequence and was thus largely replaced by the MP 40, which was designed with mass-production in mind.

== Operation ==
The MP 34 is a blowback-operated, open-bolt, selective-fire weapon (single shot or fully automatic). The return spring is located in the wooden stock and is linked to the bolt via a long push rod, attached via a pivot to the rear of the bolt. Easy access to the bolt and trigger assembly is via a hinged top cover which opens up and forward by depressing two release catches. This makes cleaning procedures very easy to perform.

On the left-hand side of the stock is a sliding fire selector switch (marked by letters T and S). Initial production runs of the gun have a Schmeisser-style bolt-locking safety (similar to the MP40) in the form of hook-shaped cut which is used to engage the bolt handle when the bolt is cocked (which is notoriously unsafe). Later models include a manual safety on the top cover, just in front of the rear sight. This safety can lock the weapon in both a cocked or closed position.

Box magazines of 32- or 20-round capacity are fed in from the left side and the magazine housing is angled slightly forward to improve cartridge feeding to prevent jams. Additionally, the same magazine housing incorporates a magazine refilling feature. An empty magazine can be inserted from underneath and locked in place. From above, stripper clips (of eight rounds each) can be fed into the magazines.

All MP 34s were manufactured with a wooden stock with a semi-pistol grip. The barrel is enclosed into a perforated cooling jacket and has a bayonet-fixing lug on the right-hand side. Front (hooded) and rear rifle-type sights are fitted, the latter marked from 100 to 500 meters.

Some versions of the weapon can be fitted with a detachable tripod for use as a machine gun.

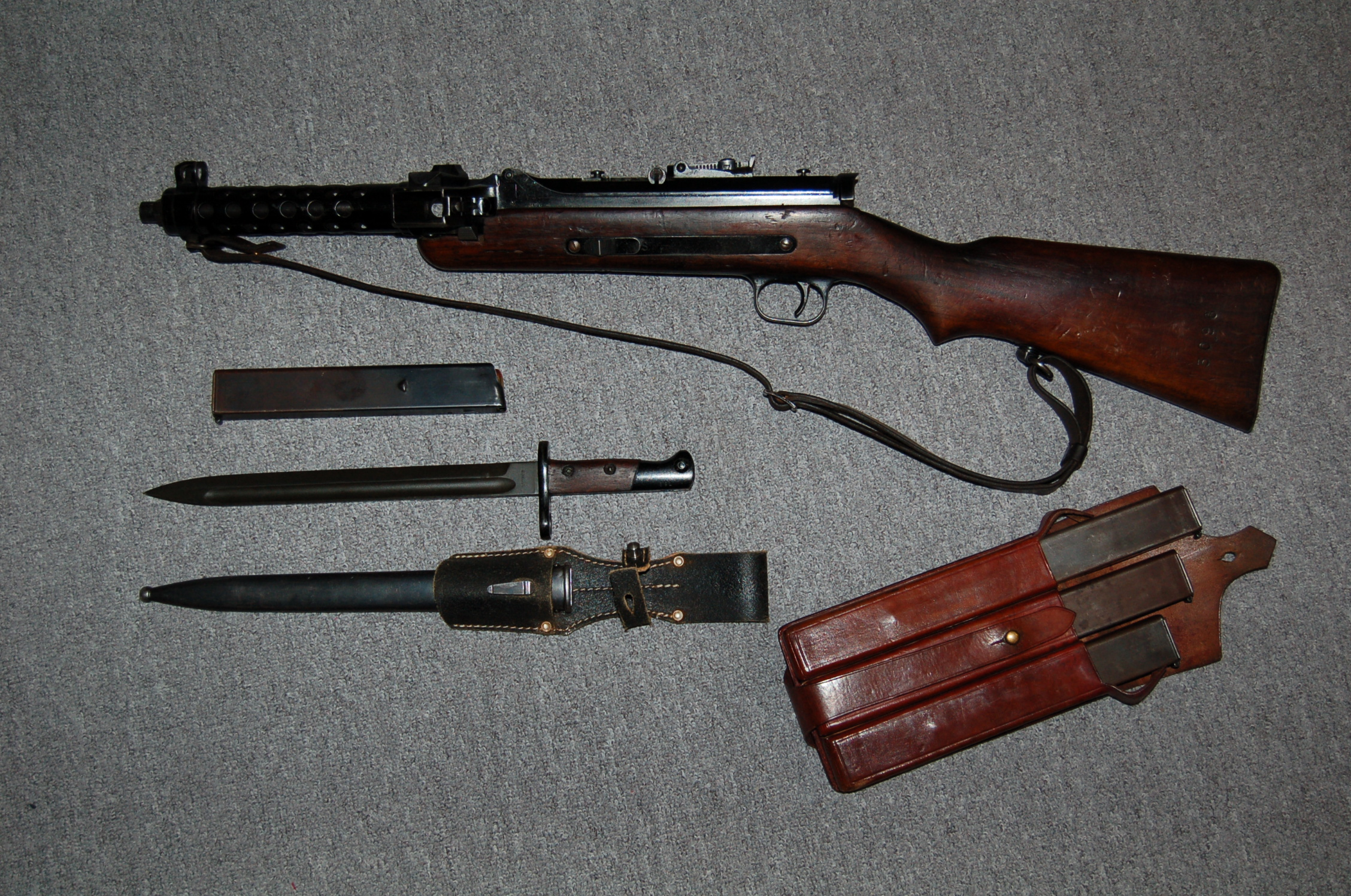
MP34, bayonet and spare magazines

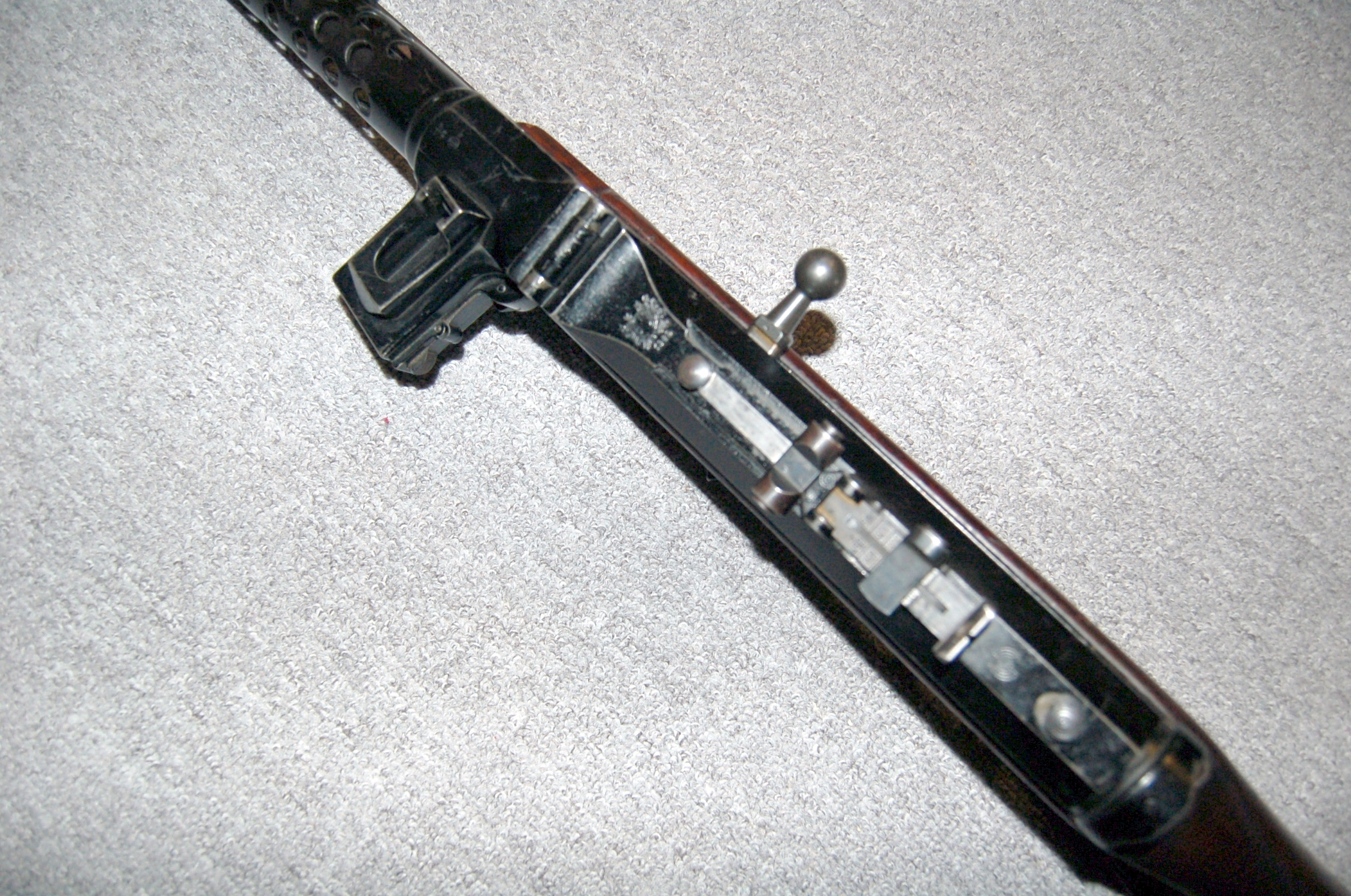
MP34 rear sights, safety and magazine housing

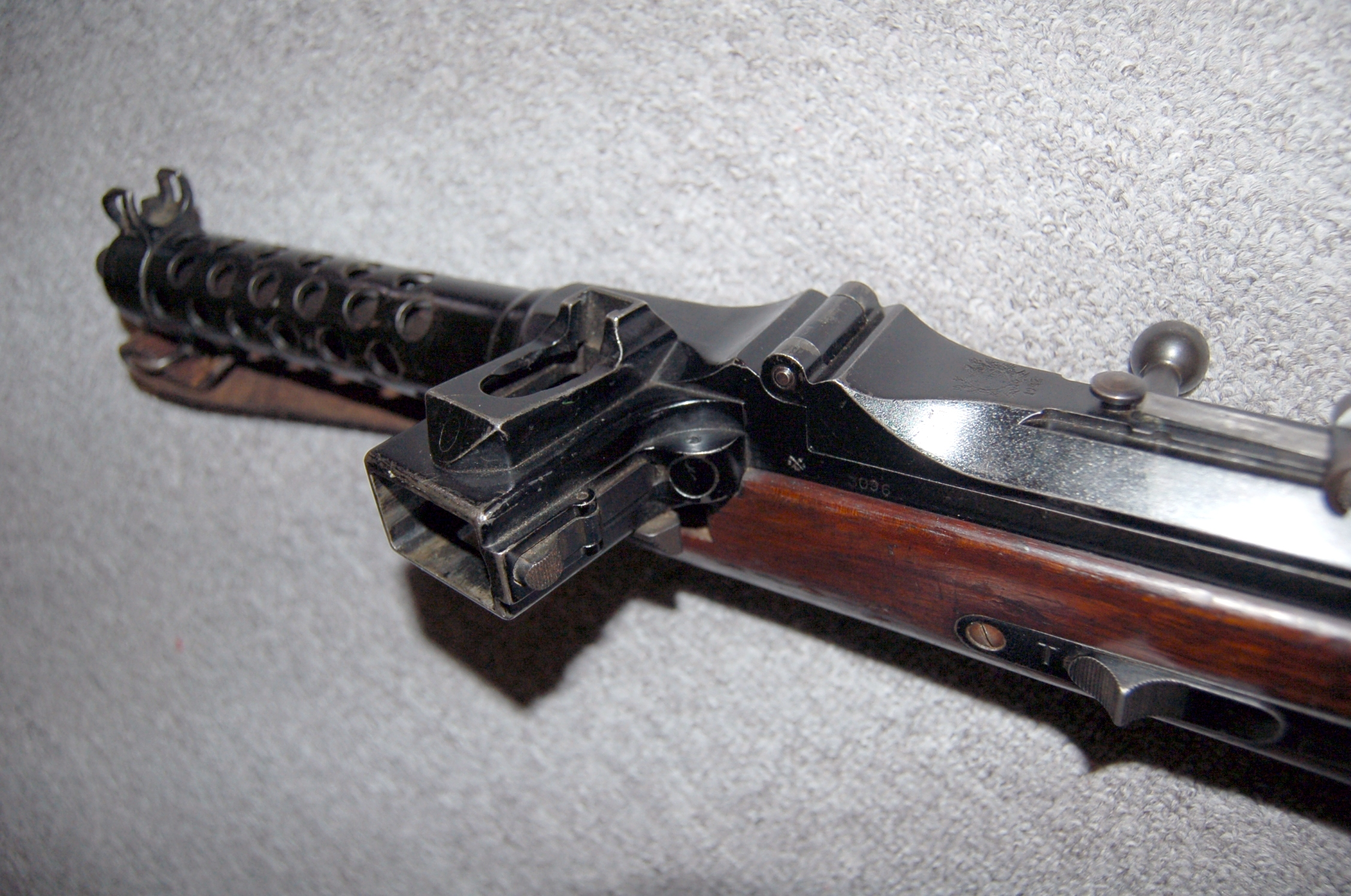
Dual purpose magazine housing

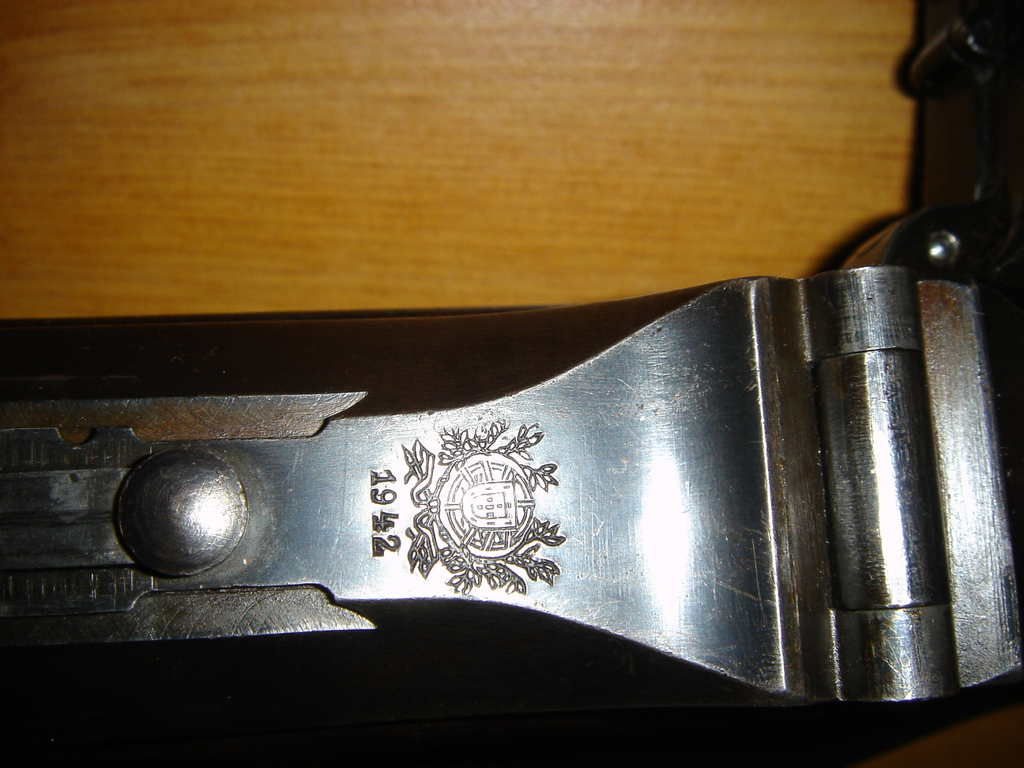
Portuguese crest on 1942 contract

== Service ==
In 1930, the Austrian police accepted the S1-100 as the Steyr MP30, chambered for then standard Austrian 9×23mm Steyr pistol rounds. The guns sold to South America, China and Japan were in 7.63x25 Mauser calibre.

The Austrian Army adopted the Steyr-Solothurn S1-100 as the Steyr MP34, chambered for the powerful 9×25mm Mauser ammunition.

With the 1938 Anschluss between Germany and Austria, the German Army acquired most of the available MP30s and MP34s. A number were then re-barrelled to chamber 9×19 ammunition and issued to German troops as the MP34(ö) – Maschinenpistole 34 österreichisch (literally "Machine-pistol 34, Austrian"). Production of the MP34 ceased in mid-1940, and manufacturing lines at Steyr moved over to the production of the MP40 – a much simpler designed weapon and far less expensive to produce than the MP34. As a substitute standard small arm, it had a relatively short combat service once quantities of the MP38 became available, though some MP34s were used by Waffen SS units in the early stages of the war in Poland and France. It was then allocated to security and reserve units, including military police and Feldgendarmerie detachments.

In Greece, various police forces under the Ministry of Security, notably the mechanized police, were equipped with the S1-100 in 9×25mm Mauser caliber. In Yugoslavia, both the Partisans and the Chetniks used captured Solothurn MP34s carried by German and Croatian troops.

Portugal bought in small quantities the .45 ACP version and was adopted as Pistola-metralhadora 11,43mm m/935. Portugal also purchased small quantities of the S1-100 in 7.65x21mm Luger calibre in 1938, and the weapon was adopted as the Pistola-metralhadora 7,65 mm m/938 Steyer submachine gun. In 1941 and 1942, larger numbers of 9mm MP34 guns were delivered to Portugal by Germany. In Portuguese service, the 9mm MP34 was known as the Pistola-metralhadora 9 mm m/942 Steyer. Many m/942 guns carry a Portuguese crest just forward of the safety mechanism in combination with Waffenamt (WaA) markings. The m/942 remained in service with Portuguese Army into the 1950s, and was used until the 1970s by paramilitary and security forces in Portugal's overseas African colonies during the Portuguese Colonial Wars.

During the late 1930s, Japan imported a small number of MP 34s for testing and limited issue.

The PAVN used this gun in the Vietnam War.

== Users ==
- Austria
- Bolivia
- Bulgaria—A small number was acquired for police units in the 1930s; used in larger numbers during WWII
- Chile
- Republic of China
- Kingdom of Greece—Used by police and gendarmerie forces
- El Salvador
- Ethiopian Empire
- Nazi Germany
- Hungary
- Italian Partisans—Used examples captured from German soldiers
- Empire of Japan
- Peru
- Portugal
- Spain
- Sweden
- Uruguay
- Venezuela
- Croatia
- (Kingdom of Yugoslavia) Yugoslav Partisans and Chetniks
- Vietnam
