= Calico M950 =

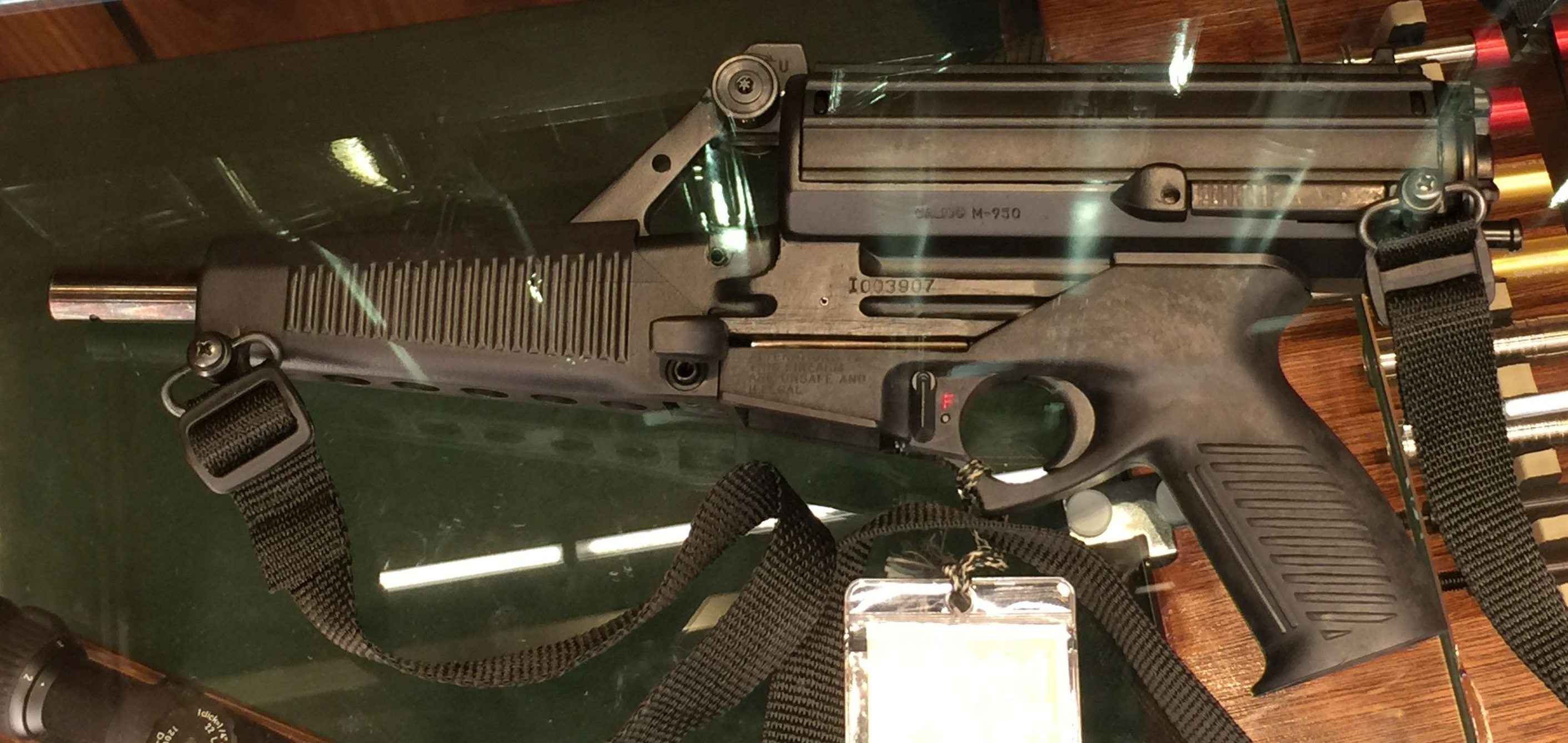
- Type: Semi-automatic pistol
- Place of origin: United States

Production history
- Designer: Calico Light Weapons Systems
- Manufacturer: Calico Light Weapons Systems

Specifications
- Mass: 2.25 lb (1.021 kg) unloaded
- Barrel length: 6 inches
- Cartridge: 9×19mm Parabellum
- Action: Roller-delayed blowback
- Muzzle velocity: 1295 ft/s (394.7 m/s)
- Maximum firing range: 300+ yards (274.3 m)
- Feed system: 50 or 100 round helical magazine
- Sights: Iron sights, can have various sights mounted

The Calico M950 is a semi-automatic pistol manufactured by Calico Light Weapons Systems in the United States. Its main feature, along with all the other guns of the Calico system, is that it feeds from a proprietary helical magazine mounted on top, available in a 50 or 100-round capacity. The factory sights enable accuracy to about 60 meters (197 feet), but 100 m is still a reasonable range.

The M950 can be configured also as a carbine (there is space to attach a foregrip) and is chambered for 9×19mm. The company produces a Calico M-1 chambered for .22LR that is superficially similar, but does not share parts with the M950. Due to the futuristic look of Calico weapons, they have appeared in many movies.

== See also ==
- Calico M960A

== Sources ==
- Dougherty, M.J. (2017). Pistols and Revolvers: From 1400 to the Present Day. Collectors Guides. Amber Books Limited. ISBN 978-1-78274-266-1.
- Wexler, B. (2023). "Calico Light Weapons Systems". 50 Guns That Changed America: An Illustrated Guide. Skyhorse. ISBN 978-1-5107-7056-0.
