= Calico M960A =

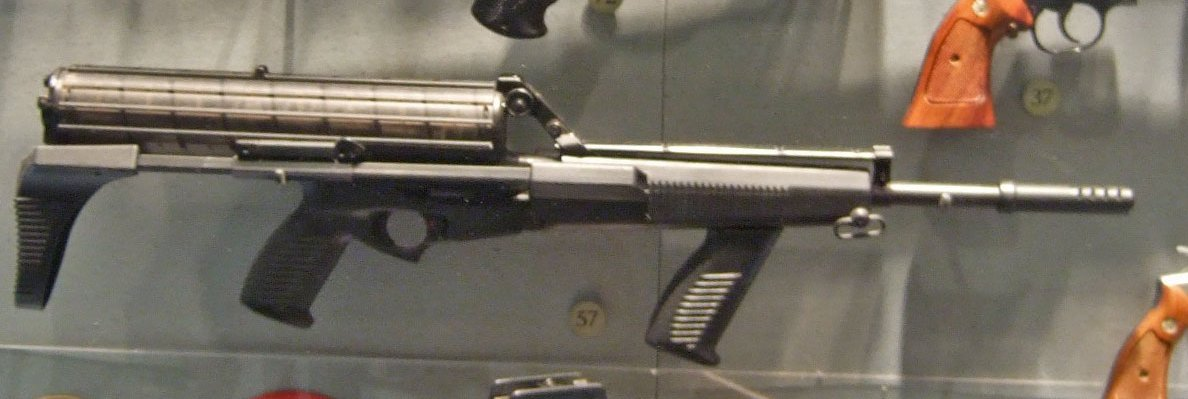
- Type: Submachine gun
- Place of origin: United States

Production history
- Designer: Calico Light Weapons Systems
- Designed: 2005
- Manufacturer: Calico Light Weapons Systems

Specifications
- Mass: 2.17 kg (4.8 lb) (empty); 2.92 kg (6.4 lb) (with a fully loaded 100 round helical magazine)
- Length: 835 mm (32.9 in) (extended); 647 mm (25.5 in) (retracted)
- Barrel length: 157 mm (6.2 in)
- Cartridge: 9×19mm Luger
- Caliber: 9 mm
- Action: Roller-delayed blowback
- Rate of fire: 750 rpm
- Muzzle velocity: 390 m/s (1,300 ft/s)
- Effective firing range: 50 m (55 yd)
- Maximum firing range: 100 m (110 yd)
- Feed system: 50- or 100-round helical magazine
- Sights: Iron sights, can have various sights mounted

The Calico M960A is an American selective-fire submachine gun (SMG) based on the Calico M950 with the addition of an extending butt and a forward grip. It is chambered for the 9×19mm Luger which takes 50-round or 100-round helical magazine which fits on top of the rear of the receiver. The M960A was first produced in 1990, and its rate of fire is 750 rpm.
