= Pál Király =

Hungarian engineer and weapons designer

- Born: 1880; Budapest, Hungary
- Died: 1965 (aged 84–85); Trujillo, Dominican Republic
- Occupations: Engineer and weapons designer
- Known for: Development of lever-delayed blowback firearms

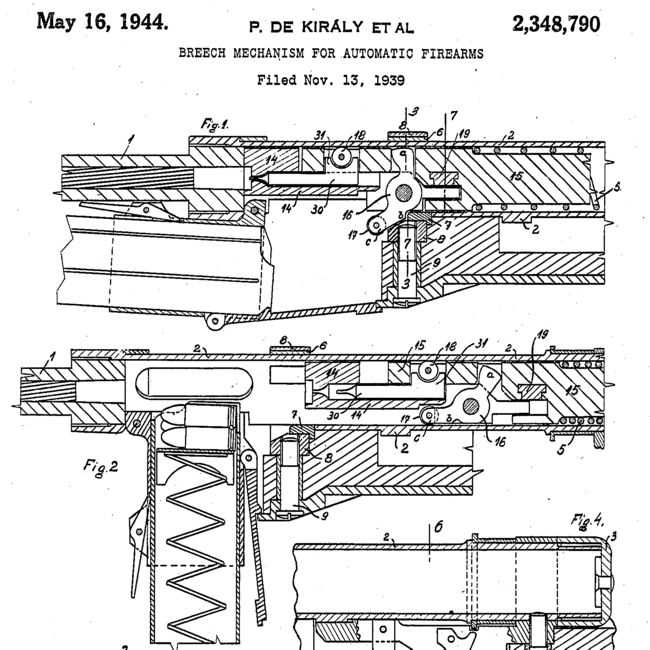
Patent for the 39M breech mechanism

Pál Király (1880–1965) was a Hungarian engineer and weapons designer.

Király was born in Budapest, Hungary, in 1880. In 1902 he earned a degree in mechanical engineering, and later joined the Austro-Hungarian army, where he rose up to the rank of Artillery Captain by the end of World War I. Pál was employed by SIG Group from 1921 to 1924, where he and Gotthard End designed the SIG KE7.

Király is best known for development of lever-delayed blowback firearms, and being employed by the Danuvia company in the 1930s and 1940s to design and produce weapons for the Royal Hungarian Army. He designed the Danuvia 39M and improved it into the Danuvia 43M submachine gun. After he moved to the Dominican republic, he designed the .30 Kiraly-Cristobal carbine, which was essentially a copy of his earlier work, specifically the 44M (an improved 43M). He made two more Cristobal carbine versions, the delayed blowback M2 in .30 Carbine and the gas-operated M3 in 7.62×51mm NATO. He patented the latter in 1961 as a competitor to the Belgian FN FAL.

Pál moved to the Dominican Republic in 1947, where he worked for the Armería San Cristóbal Weapon Factory and designed the Cristóbal Carbine.
