= Kucher Model K1 =

Kucher Light Machine Pistol Model K1
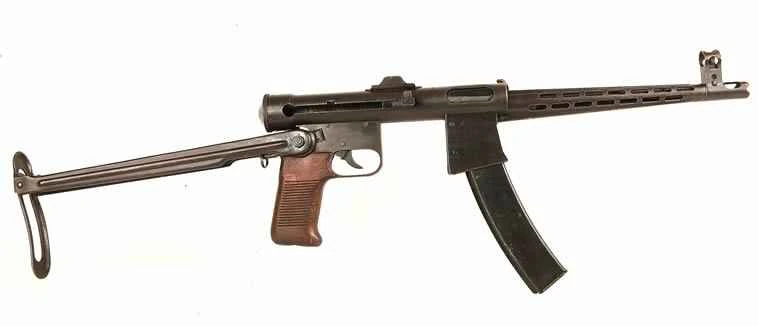
- Type: Submachine gun
- Place of origin: People's Republic of Hungary

Service history
- In service: 1953
- Used by: Hungary

Production history
- Designer: József Kucher
- Designed: 1951
- No. built: ~800

Specifications
- Mass: 3.1 kg (6.8 lb) empty, 3.7 kg (8.2 lb) fully loaded
- Length: 844 mm (33.2 in), 532 mm (20.9 in) stock folded
- Barrel length: 280 mm (11 in)
- Cartridge: 7.62×25mm Tokarev
- Action: Blowback
- Rate of fire: 700 rounds/min
- Muzzle velocity: 480 m/s (1,600 ft/s)
- Effective firing range: 100–200 m (110–220 yd)
- Feed system: detachable box magazine 35 round
- Sights: Front: windage and elevation adjustable post Back: Two-position notch

The Kucher K1, also known as the Danuvia M53 K1, was a Hungarian magazine-fed submachine gun designed by József Kucher in 1951, based on the Danuvia 44.M prototype submachine gun. It was produced by the titular Danuvia company. The submachine gun was known in Hungarian service as the Gepisztoly 53 Minta or as the "Spigon submachine gun".

After passing tests in military trials at Táborfalva on 11 November 1951, it was adopted by the Hungarian Ministry of Defense, and often referred to as the 'Pénzügyőr Géppisztoly' (Financier/Treasury Machine Gun). Some sources claim it was adopted in 1953 and received the designation 53.M. The K1 was produced in limited numbers (exact count unknown) before being replaced by a Hungarian copy of the PPSh-41 for army use, and was mostly issued to border guards and treasury officers, remaining in service until the 1960s.

The K1 used an open-bolt, blowback action, fed by a 35-round, curved, double-stack magazine. It weighed around 6.8 lbs and was 33.2 inches long with the stock extended. Due to being milled rather than using stamped metal it required more time to manufacture and cost more than many of its contemporaries.

== Users ==
- Hungarian People's Republic

=== Non-state users ===
- PLO

== See also ==
- PPSh-41
- Type 85 submachine gun - comparable Chinese weapon
