= DS-39 =

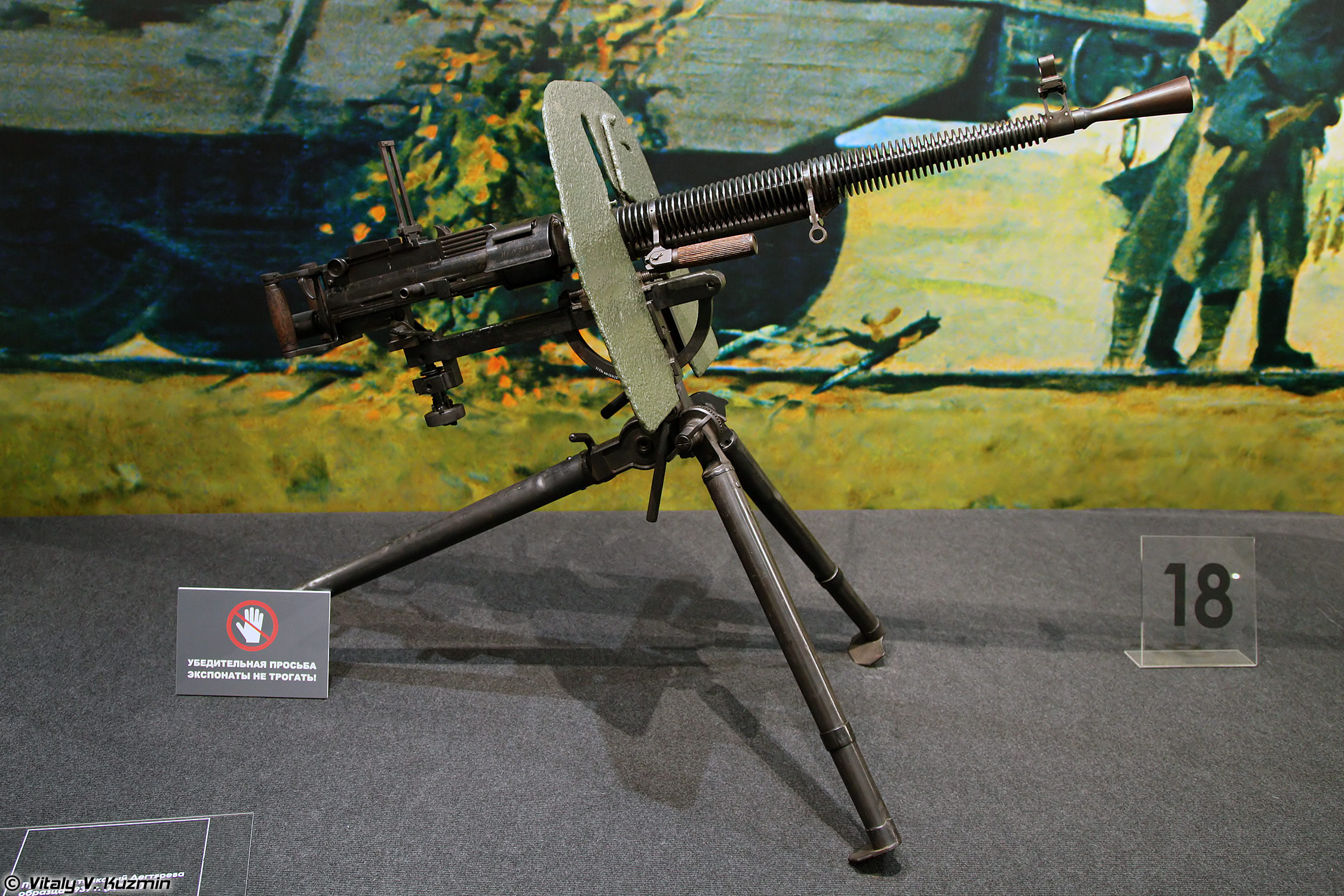
- On display at the Tula State Arms Museum
- Type: Medium machine gun
- Place of origin: Soviet Union

Service history
- In service: 1939–1945
- Used by: See users
- Wars: World War II

Production history
- Designer: Vasily Degtyaryov
- Designed: 1930
- Manufacturer: Tula Arsenal
- Produced: 1940–1941
- No. built: 10,315
- Variants: DS-42 (prototype)

Specifications
- Mass: 14.3 kg (32 lb) (gun body) + 28 kg (62 lb) (tripod and gun shield)
- Length: 1,170 mm (46 in)
- Barrel length: 723 mm (28.5 in)
- Cartridge: 7.62×54mmR
- Action: Gas-operated, flapper locking
- Rate of fire: 600 or 1,200 rpm (select fire)
- Muzzle velocity: 810 m/s (2,650 ft/s)
- Feed system: 250-round belt

DS-39 (Russian: Дегтярёва Станковый образца 1939 года, romanized: Degtyaryova Stankovyy obraztsa 1939 goda) was a Soviet medium machine gun, designed by Vasily Degtyaryov, that was used during the Second World War. The work on the gun's design began in 1930, and it was accepted by the Red Army in September, 1939. About 10,000 were made from 1939 to 1941, but the weapon was not successful in service and its production was discontinued after the German invasion began in June, 1941, with factories converted to produce the older, more reliable PM M1910 (a WWI-era Maxim machine gun design) which was in turn replaced by the SG-43 Goryunov medium machine gun in 1943.

== Background ==
The Soviets began mulling on a replacement for the PM M1910 in the 1920s: (Note: In the following chapter of the book Machine guns: 14th century to present, Ian V. Hogg stated that the Soviets began looking for a Maxim replacement during the 1930s.) while the Maxim proved to be a sound design, it was slow to manufacture, required specialized machine tools and skilled workers, it was also heavy to carry around in the battlefield, specially with the soldiers having to carry water for cooling the barrel. (Note: Due to the lessons learned from the Winter War against Finland, the PM M1910 was modified with a larger filler cap on the water jacket to allow soldiers to fill it up with handfuls of snow and ice during the winter.) Keeping the gun supplied with water was also problematic in the deserts of Soviet Union southern regions.

In 1928, they defined the specifications: It needed to be an air-cooled design with a firing mechanism similar to the DP and DT machine guns already in use (to simplify training), a firing rate of 500 rounds per minute, and fed by 150-round belts; the complete gun also needed to weigh no more than 30 kg (66 lb) with its mount, while the mounting itself had to be a tripod (with or without wheels) weighing no more than 15 kg (33 lb). Degtyaryov began working on the DS in 1930 with the assistance of Georgy Shpagin, who developed the belt-feeding system. After a long process of trials and fixing teething problems, the system was formally adopted by the Red Army in September 1939, (Note: According to McNab, the DS-39 was adopted in October 1939.) with serial production beginning in June 1940.

== Design ==
The DS-39 was a tripod-mounted gun using the same flapper locking action and gas piston used on the DP and DT machine guns, but the pan magazine was replaced by a belt feed and it featured a heavy finned barrel to improve air-cooling. Upon firing, the locking flaps are pushed outwards by the firing pin, which in turn is pushed forward by the bolt carrier. It also had an adjustable gas regulator and could be fitted with a spring-loaded buffer that doubled the rate of fire.

The gun had two spade grips with a trigger for each index finger, but the DS could only be fired after a thumb latch on the left grip was pushed (and the barrel was firmly locked in place). The right grip housed a brush and oil reservoir. The gun was fed with 250-round non-disintegrating metallic belts, or canvas belts used by the Maxim gun.

The Degtyaryov was a relatively simple design, capable of being disassembled without tools (though George M. Chinn stated that it wasn't as easy in comparison to other contemporary designs), but it also had little to no interchangeable parts, and the finely machined exterior made it too difficult for mass production.

Under field conditions the DS-39 proved to be unreliable: the feeding system had a tendency of tearing the cartridge cases, forcing the Soviets to use steel-cased ammunition instead of brass, and loading the gun with heavy bullets resulted in bullets getting split, the gun jammed under dusty conditions and froze up in cold weather. In the anti-aircraft role, the tripod mount was unstable at maximum elevation and raising the fire rate only exacerbated the problems.

According to Ian V. Hogg, the gun was so problematic that its defects could only be ironed out with a complete redesign, which was one of the reasons why the Soviets resumed production of the PM M1910/30 during the German invasion. According to Chinn, the failure of the DS-39 was mostly due to problems of producing it in a large scale rather than the gun performance itself.

== Operational history ==
Prior to German invasion in 1941, the Soviets relied on large numbers of the PM M1910/30 and despite misgivings, the DS-39 as their medium machine guns. After the invasion, the Soviets quickly resumed production of the Maxim and began searching for a replacement. In the spring of 1943, they chose a design by Pyotr Goryunov, the SG-43 as a replacement for the M1910/30 and the DS. An improved version known as the DS-42 was tested in 1942, but ultimately the Goryunov was deemed as more rugged, simpler and cheaper to manufacture, while having a similar performance to Degtyaryov's design.

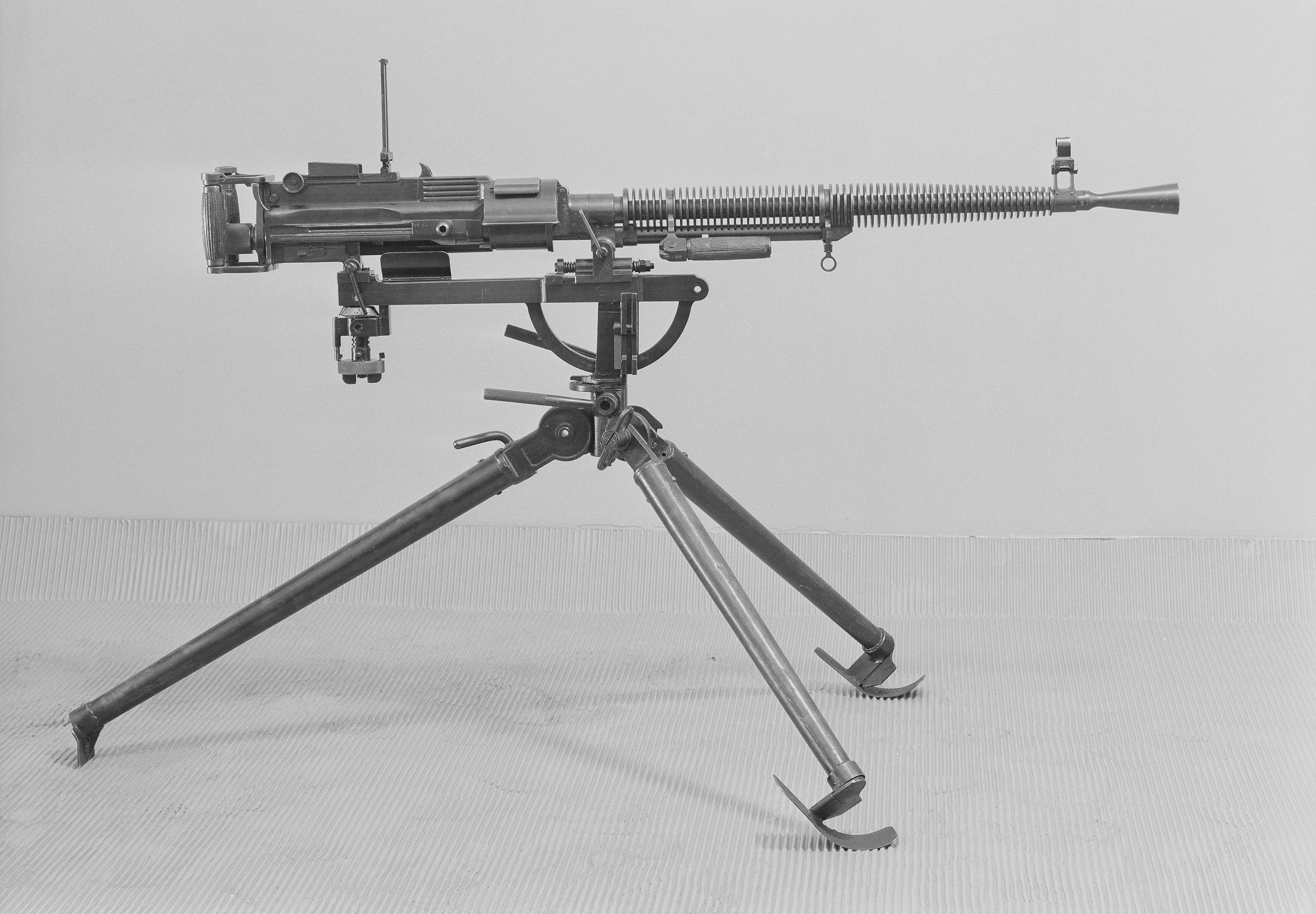
A DS-39 captured by the Finns, 1942

A total of 10,315 guns were produced between June 1940 and summer 1941 at the Tula Arsenal. While the M1910/30 remained in use with front-line troops, the remaining DS-39s were mostly issued to second-line troops.

About 200 were captured by Finland in 1941 during the Continuation War and used against their former owners; they also received some modifications—mostly around the action—from Aimo Lahti, partially solving the reliability problems.

These Finnish conversions remained in use until 1944, while surviving guns were kept in storage until 1986; most were scrapped afterwards with only a handful surviving in military museums and private collections.

== Users ==
- Finland
- Soviet Union

== See also ==
- List of Russian weaponry
