= Vasily Degtyaryov =

Russian and Soviet weapons designer (1880–1949)

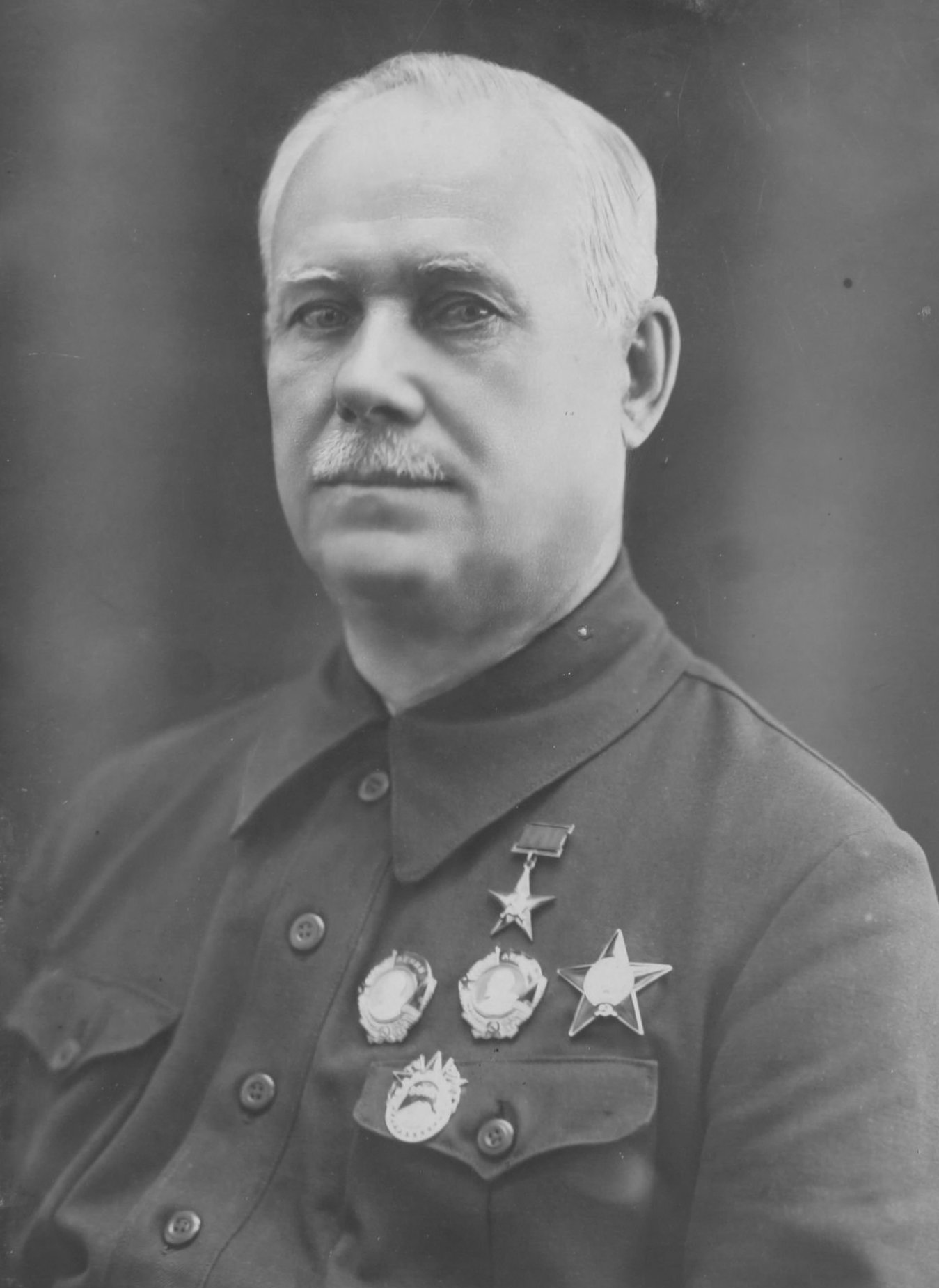
- Degtyaryov in 1941
- Born: Vasily Alekseyevich Degtyaryov; 2 January 1880; Tula, Russian Empire
- Died: 16 January 1949 (aged 69); Moscow, Soviet Union
- Occupation: Firearms designer

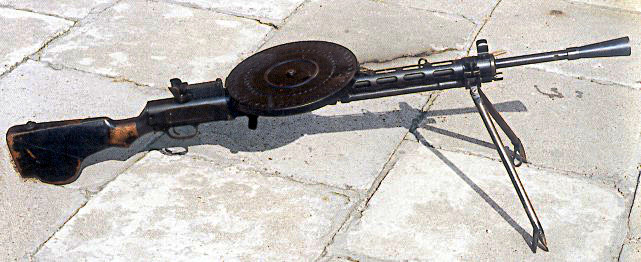
DP-27

Vasily Alekseyevich Degtyaryov (Russian: Васи́лий Алексе́евич Дегтярёв; 2 January 1880, Tula – 16 January 1949, Moscow) was a Soviet and Russian engineer who specialized in weapons design. He was awarded the title of Hero of Socialist Labour in 1940.

== Biography ==
He was a factory worker at the Tula Arms Plant. He became married in 1905. Starting in 1918, Vasily Degtyaryov headed the first Soviet firearms design bureau at Kovrov Arms Factory.

In 1927, the Red Army was equipped with his 7.62 mm light machine gun DP-27. This design led to the development of the DT tank machine gun (1927) and two aircraft machine guns: DA and DA-2 (1928).

In 1940 he became a Doctor of Technical Sciences, and Hero of Socialist Labour (he received the second such award in its history just two weeks after Joseph Stalin). He joined the Communist Party of the Soviet Union in 1941.

During the Axis invasion of the USSR in summer 1941 he created the PTRD-41 14.5mm anti-tank rifle. In 1944 he became Major General of the Engineering and Artillery Service of the Soviet Union. He designed a belt-fed light machine gun, the RPD, chambered for the 7.62×39mm intermediate cartridge.

Vasily Degtyaryov was awarded the Stalin Prize in 1941, 1942, 1944, and 1949 (posthumously).

He died on January 16th of 1949 and was later buried in a cemetery in Kovrov.

== Inventions ==
Degtyaryov developed a total 82 types of machine guns, submachine guns and anti-tank rifles, 19 of them were officially adopted.

- Degtyaryov designed several models of submachine guns, the best of which would be adopted by the Soviet Army in 1934 (modernized in 1940) as the ППД PPD-40 (from Пистолет-пулемёт Дегтярёва, "Degtyaryov's submachine gun").
- In 1930, Degtyaryov designed a 12.7 mm large-caliber machine gun, the ДК, or DK (Дегтярёва Крупнокалиберный, "Large-caliber Degtyaryov"). In 1938, this machine gun was upgraded by Georgy Shpagin and renamed ДШК (DShK) (Дегтярёва Шпагина Крупнокалиберный, "Large-caliber Shpagin-Degtyaryov").
- In 1939, Degtyaryov designed his heavy machine gun called ДС, or DS (Дегтярёва Станковый "Heavy Degtyaryov"). The DS-39 was issued to the Red Army and used in the Winter War of 1939–1940. The belt feed mechanism damaged the cartridge cases and the gun was found too complicated and liable to malfunctions and was withdrawn from service.

== Honours and awards ==
- Stalin Prizes first degree (1941)
- Stalin Prizes second degree (1942)
- Stalin Prizes second degree (1946)
- Stalin Prizes first degree (1949 – posthumous)
- Hero of Socialist Labour (January 1940)
- Three Orders of Lenin (1933, 1940, 1944)
- Order of Suvorov first degree (September 1945)
- Order of Suvorov second degree (November 1944)
- Order of the Red Banner of Labour
- Order of the Red Star
- Medal "For the Victory over Germany in the Great Patriotic War 1941–1945" (1945)

== Commemoration ==
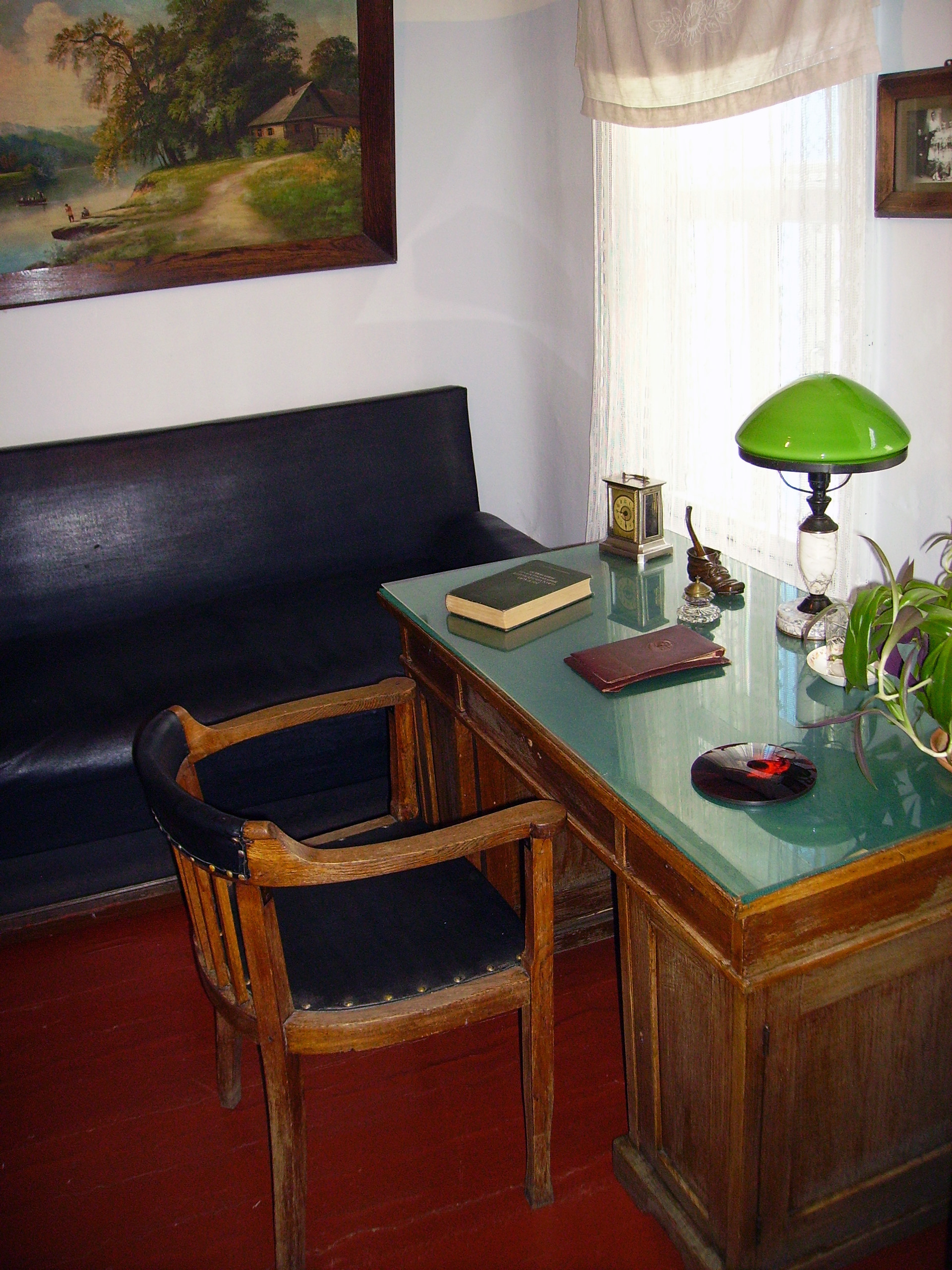
The engineer's room in the house-museum

On the day of the designer’s death, by a resolution of the Council of Ministers of the USSR, monthly scholarships were established in his name:

- one is for graduate students (850 rubles) and one for is students (400 rubles) of the Leningrad Military Mechanical Institute;
- two are for post-graduate students (850 rubles) and two are for students (400 rubles) of the Tula Mechanical Institute;
- five are for excellent students (350 rubles) of the Kovrov College.

On October 17, 1954, a monument was erected in Kovrov for Degtyaryov, and a bust and several plaques were installed on the territory of the weapons factory bearing his name. At the memorial for gunsmiths and designers, a bas-relief was made in his likeness. A museum was opened in Degtyaryov's house on January 6, 1978. In addition, a technical school, a secondary school, a kindergarten, a recreation park, the House of Culture of Metal Workers and the former Komsomolskaya Street in Kovrov were named after him. A pioneer camp near the village of Sukhanikha was named after Degtyaryov. In many cities of the former USSR (Kharkiv, Novosibirsk, Lomonosov, Saint Petersburg) streets carry the name of Degtyaryov. On November 6, 1979, on the occasion of the centennial of the designer's birth, the USSR Ministry of Communications issued a postal envelope with his image. January 2, 1980 in Kovrov held a special cancellation of these envelopes. On August 18, 2004, the Russian Post also issued an envelope depicting Degtyaryov.

== In popular culture ==
- Degtyaryov appears in the 2020 Russian biographical film AK-47, played by Valery Barinov.

== See also ==
- Degtyaryov Plant
- RPD machine gun
