= PPD-40 =

PPD
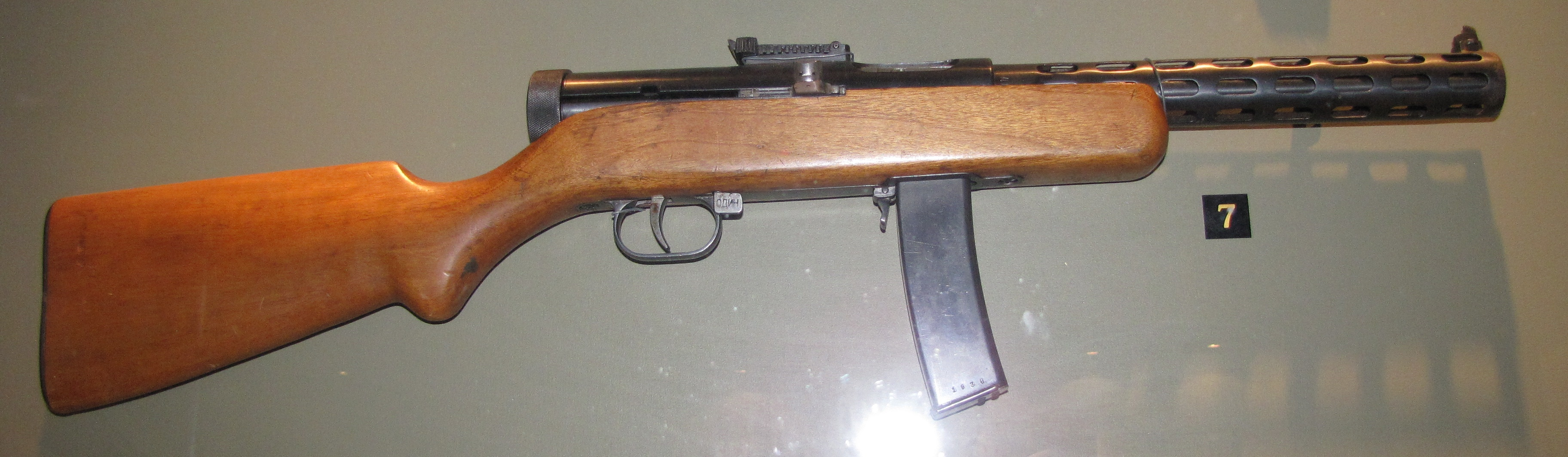
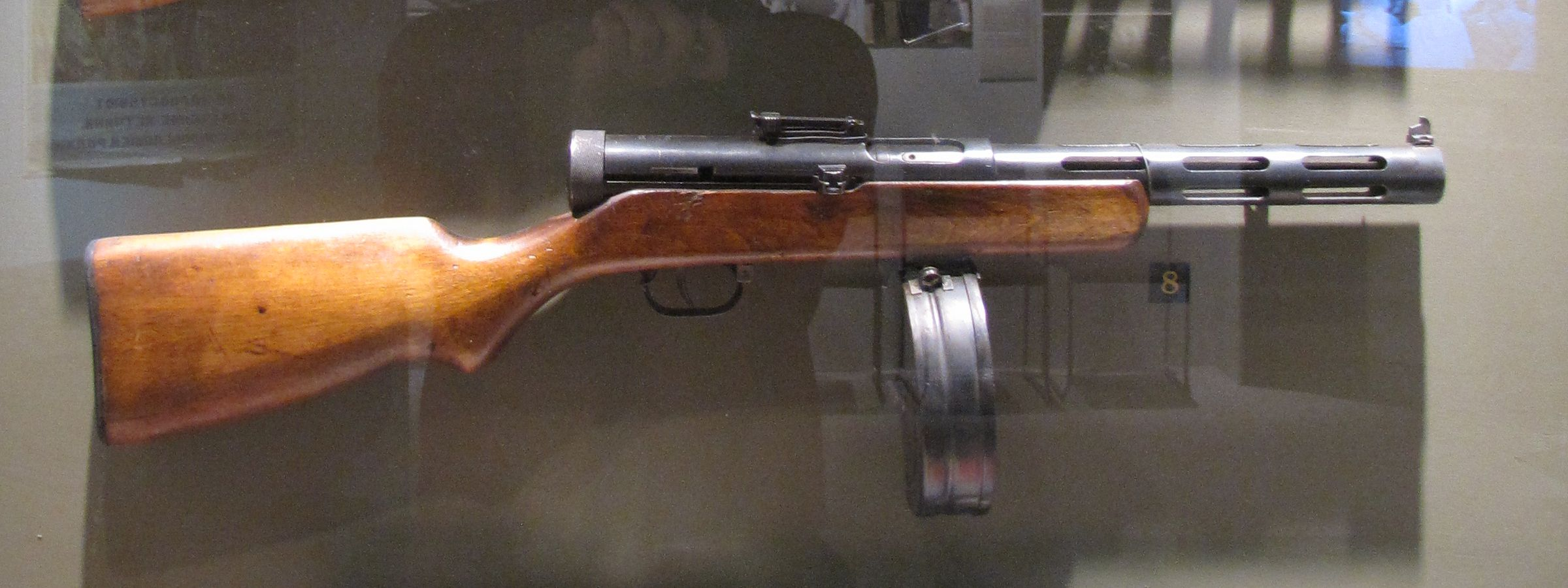
- PPD-34 & PPD-34/38
- Type: Submachine gun
- Place of origin: Soviet Union

Service history
- In service: 1935–1945 (in Soviet service)
- Used by: See Users
- Wars: Spanish Civil War; Winter War; Second Sino Japanese War; World War II; Korean War; Hukbalahap Rebellion; 1958 Lebanon crisis Lebanese Civil War

Production history
- Designer: Vasily Degtyaryov
- Designed: 1934
- Produced: 1934–1944; most in 1940
- No. built: Approx. 90,000
- Variants: PPD-34, PPD-34/38, PPD-40

Specifications
- Mass: 3.2 kg (7.1 lb) empty
- Length: 788 mm (31.0 in)
- Barrel length: 273 mm (10.7 in)
- Cartridge: 7.62×25mm Tokarev
- Action: Blowback, open bolt
- Rate of fire: 800–1000 rounds/min
- Muzzle velocity: 490 m/s (1,600 ft/s)
- Effective firing range: 200 m (219 yd)
- Feed system: 25-round detachable box magazine 71-round detachable drum magazine

The PPD (Russian: Пистоле́т-пулемёт Дегтярёва, romanized: Pistolet-pulemyot Degtyaryova, lit. 'Degtyaryov's machine pistol') is a submachine gun originally designed in 1934 by Vasily Degtyaryov. The PPD had a conventional wooden stock, fired from an open bolt, and was capable of selective fire. It was replaced by the PPSh-41.

== History ==
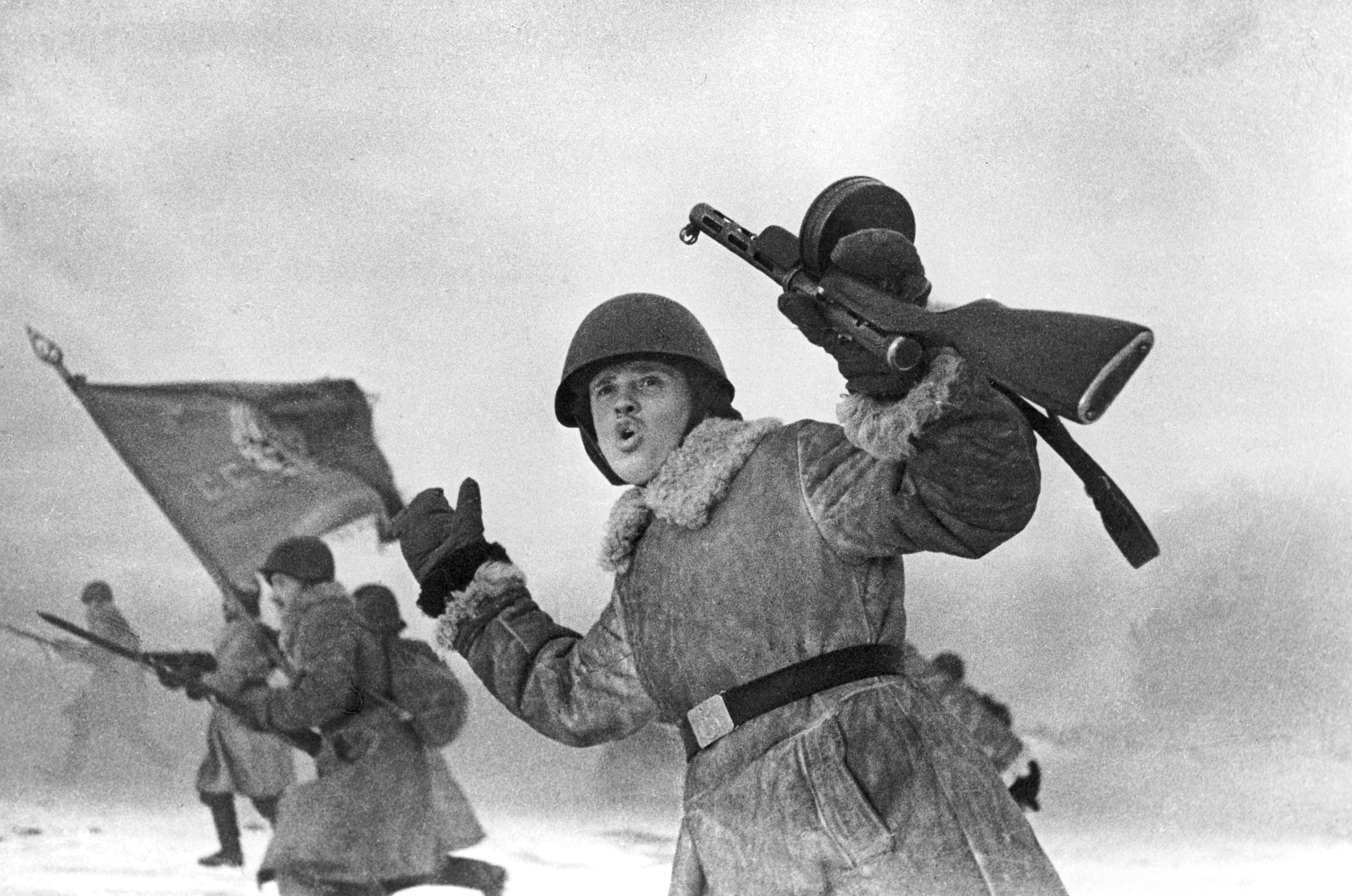
Soviet soldier holding a PPD-40 with two-part wooden stock.

Developed in the Soviet Union by arms designer Vasily Degtyaryov, the PPD was designed to chamber the new Soviet 7.62×25mm Tokarev pistol cartridge, which was based on the 7.63×25mm Mauser cartridge used in the Mauser C96 pistol. The later PPD models utilized a large drum magazine for ammunition feeding.

The PPD officially went into military service with the Red Army in 1935 as the PPD-34, although it was not produced in large quantities. Production issues were not solved until 1937; in 1934 only 44 were produced, in 1935 only 23; production picked up in 1937 with 1,291 produced, followed by 1,115 produced in 1938 and 1,700 produced in 1939. It saw use with the NKVD internal forces as well as border guards. The PPD was decommissioned entirely in 1939 and factory orders cancelled following a directive of the People's Commissariat of Defence Industry; the decision was quickly reversed, though, after the personal intervention of Degtyaryov with Stalin, with whom he had a good personal relationship. During the Winter War in 1939 with Finland, an acute lack of individual automatic weapons even led to the reintroduction of the stockpiled Fedorov Avtomats into service.

In 1938 and 1940, modified versions were designated PPD-34/38 and PPD-40 respectively, and introduced minor changes, mostly aimed at making it easier to manufacture. Mass production began in 1940, a year in which 81,118 PPDs were produced. Nevertheless, the PPD-40 was too labor- and resource-expensive to mass-produce economically, most of its metal components being produced by milling. Although it was used in action in World War II, it was officially replaced by the superior and cheaper PPSh-41 by the end of 1941. Shpagin's great innovation in Soviet automatic weapons manufacturing was the large-scale introduction of stamped metal parts, particularly receivers; the PPSh also had a muzzle climb compensator which significantly improved accuracy over the PPD. In 1941 only 5,868 PPDs were made, compared to 98,644 PPSh and in the following year almost 1.5 million PPSh were produced.

PPDs captured by Finnish forces during the Winter War and Continuation War were issued to coastal and home guard troops and kept in reserve until approximately 1960. PPD-34/38 and PPD-40 submachine guns captured by the Wehrmacht were given the designations MP.715(r) and MP.716(r) respectively.

A number of PPD-like submachine guns were also manufactured in a semi-artisanal way by gunsmiths among the hundreds of thousands of Soviet partisans. These guns, even when made as late as 1944, used milling because metal stamping requires large industrial facilities that were not available to the partisans. There are no firm numbers about how many were made, but there were at least six partisan gunsmiths each making his own model series. One of them is known to have produced 28 such sub-machine guns in approximately two years.

== Users ==
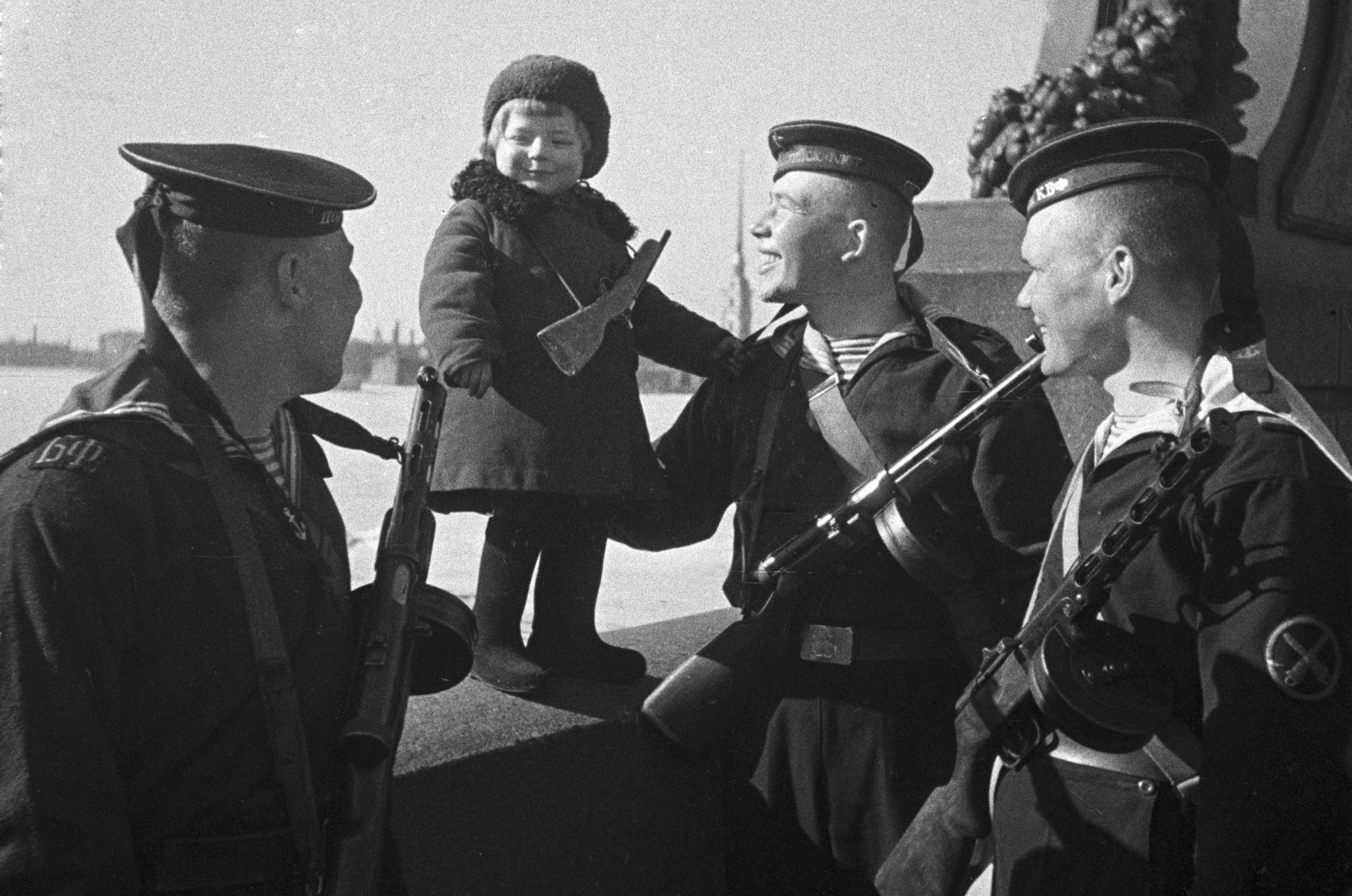
Sailors of the Baltic Fleet armed with PPD-40 (left two), PPSh-41 (rightmost) and a child in May 1943.

- Albania
- Taiwan: Received 3,000 during the Second Sino Japanese War.
- Finland
- Nazi Germany: Captured PPD-34/38s designated the Maschinenpistole 716(r). Captured PPD-40s designated the Maschinenpistole 715(r).
- Poland
- Lebanese Forces
- North Korea
- Hukbalahap
- (Slovak Republic (1939–1945)) Slovakia: Used by Slovak forces on the Eastern Front.
- Soviet Union
- Spain: The PPD-34 and the PPD-34/38 were both used by the Spanish Republican Army during Spanish Civil War.
- Yugoslavia: 5,000 were delivered from Soviet Union during 1944–1945.

== See also ==
- List of Russian weaponry
- List of submachine guns
- Tokarev Model 1927
- MP35
- Suomi KP/-31
- PPSh-41
