= Klyushnikovo =

Klyushnikovo Клюшниково
- Village
- Location within Vladimir Oblast Location within Russia
- Coordinates: 56°10′N 41°11′E
- Country: Russia
- Region: Vladimir Oblast
- District: Kovrovsky District
- Time zone: UTC+3:00

Klyushnikovo (Russian: Клюшниково) is a rural locality (a village) in Novoselskoye Rural Settlement, Kovrovsky District, Vladimir Oblast, Russia. The population was 18 as of 2010.

== Geography ==
Klyushnikovo is located 29 km southwest of Kovrov (the district's administrative centre) by road. Anokhino is the nearest rural locality.

== Notable people ==
- Georgy Shpagin (1897–1952), weapons designer
