= DShK =

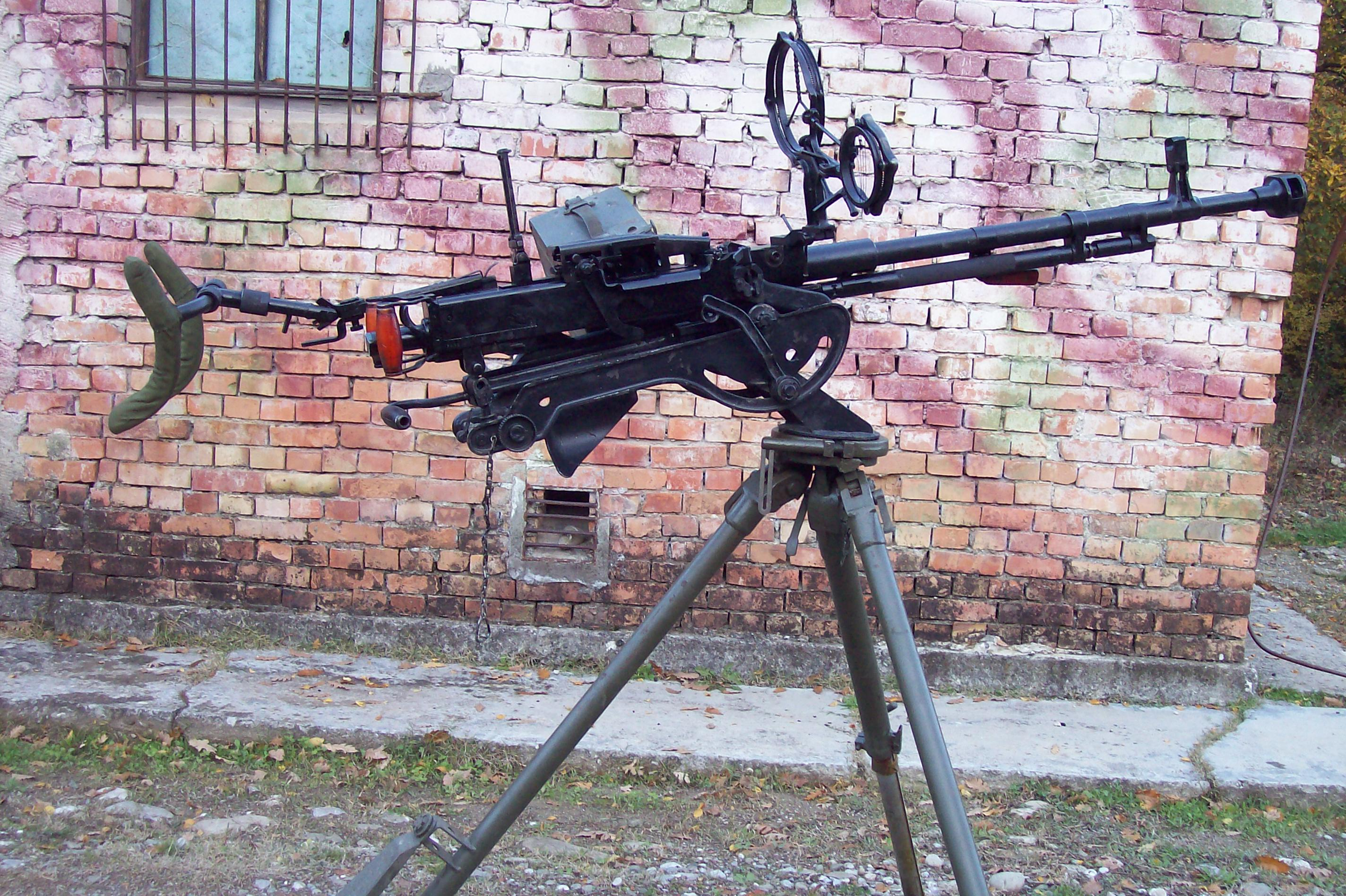
- Albanian "DShKM" (local version) used for anti-aircraft purposes
- Type: Heavy machine gun
- Place of origin: Soviet Union

Service history
- In service: 1938–present
- Used by: See users
- Wars: Second World War; Winter War; Chinese Civil War; First Indochina War; Korean War; Vietnam War; Indonesia–Malaysia confrontation; Operation Trikora; First Sudanese Civil War; Laotian Civil War; Dhofar Rebellion; Portuguese Colonial War; Rhodesian Bush War; Communist insurgency in Thailand; South African Border War; Cambodian Civil War; Six Day War; Yom Kippur War; Rhodesian Bush War; Ethiopian Civil War; Lebanese Civil War; Angolan Civil War; Cambodian-Vietnamese War; Western Sahara War; Afghanistan conflict (1978–present); Sino-Vietnamese War; Chadian–Libyan War; 1979 Kurdish rebellion in Iran; Iran–Iraq War; Second Sudanese Civil War; Sri Lankan Civil War; The Troubles; First and Second Liberian Civil Wars; Somali Civil War; KDPI insurgency (1989–1996); Tuareg rebellion (1990–1995); Gulf War; Yugoslav Wars; Rwandan Civil War; First and Second Chechen Wars; Kargil War; Operation Enduring Freedom; Iraq War; Cambodian–Thai border dispute; First Libyan Civil War; Syrian Civil War; Operation Linda Nchi; Northern Mali conflict; War in Iraq (2013–2017); Second Libyan Civil War; Russo-Ukrainian war; Yemeni Civil War (2014–present); Conflict in Najran, Jizan and Asir; Tigray War; Gaza War (2023–present)

Production history
- Designer: Vasily Degtyaryov; Georgi Shpagin
- Designed: 1938
- Manufacturer: Tula Arms Plant
- Unit cost: US$2,250 (2012)
- Produced: 1938–1980 (Soviet Union)
- No. built: 1,000,000
- Variants: DShK 38/46; Type 54

Specifications
- Mass: 34 kg (74 lb 15 oz) (gun only); 157 kg (346 lb 2 oz) on wheeled mounting
- Length: 1,625 mm (5 ft 4.0 in)
- Barrel length: 1,070 mm (42.1 in)
- Cartridge: 12.7×108mm 12.7×99mm NATO (Romania)
- Action: Gas-operated, flapper locking
- Rate of fire: 600 rounds/min
- Muzzle velocity: 850 m/s (2,800 ft/s)
- Effective firing range: 2,000 m (2,200 yd)
- Maximum firing range: 2,500 m (2,700 yd)
- Feed system: 50 round belt
- Sights: Iron/optical

The DShK M1938 (Russian: ДШК, for Дегтярёва-Шпагина крупнокалиберный, Degtyaryova-Shpagina krupnokaliberny, 'Degtyaryov–Shpagin large-calibre') is a Soviet heavy machine gun. The weapon may be vehicle mounted or used on a tripod or wheeled carriage as a heavy infantry machine gun. The DShK's name is derived from its original designer, Vasily Degtyaryov, and Georgi Shpagin, who later improved the cartridge feed mechanism. It is sometimes nicknamed Dushka (Душка, lit. 'darling' or 'a dea' or 'or beloved person') or Dochka (Дочка, 'daughter') in Slavic-speaking regions and in the DShK using countries, from the abbreviation.

== Specifications ==
The DShK is a belt-fed machine gun firing the 12.7×108mm cartridge, and uses a butterfly trigger. Firing at 600 rounds per minute, it has an effective range of 2.4 km (1 1/2 mi), and can penetrate up to 20 mm of armor up to a range of 500 m. The DShK has two "spider web" ring sights for use against aircraft. It is used by infantry on tripod mounts or deployed with a two-wheeled mounting and a single-sheet armor-plate shield. It is also mounted on tanks and armored vehicles for use against infantry and aircraft; nearly all Soviet-designed tanks with roof or cupola mounts for heavy machine-guns prior to the T-64 use the DShK.

== History ==
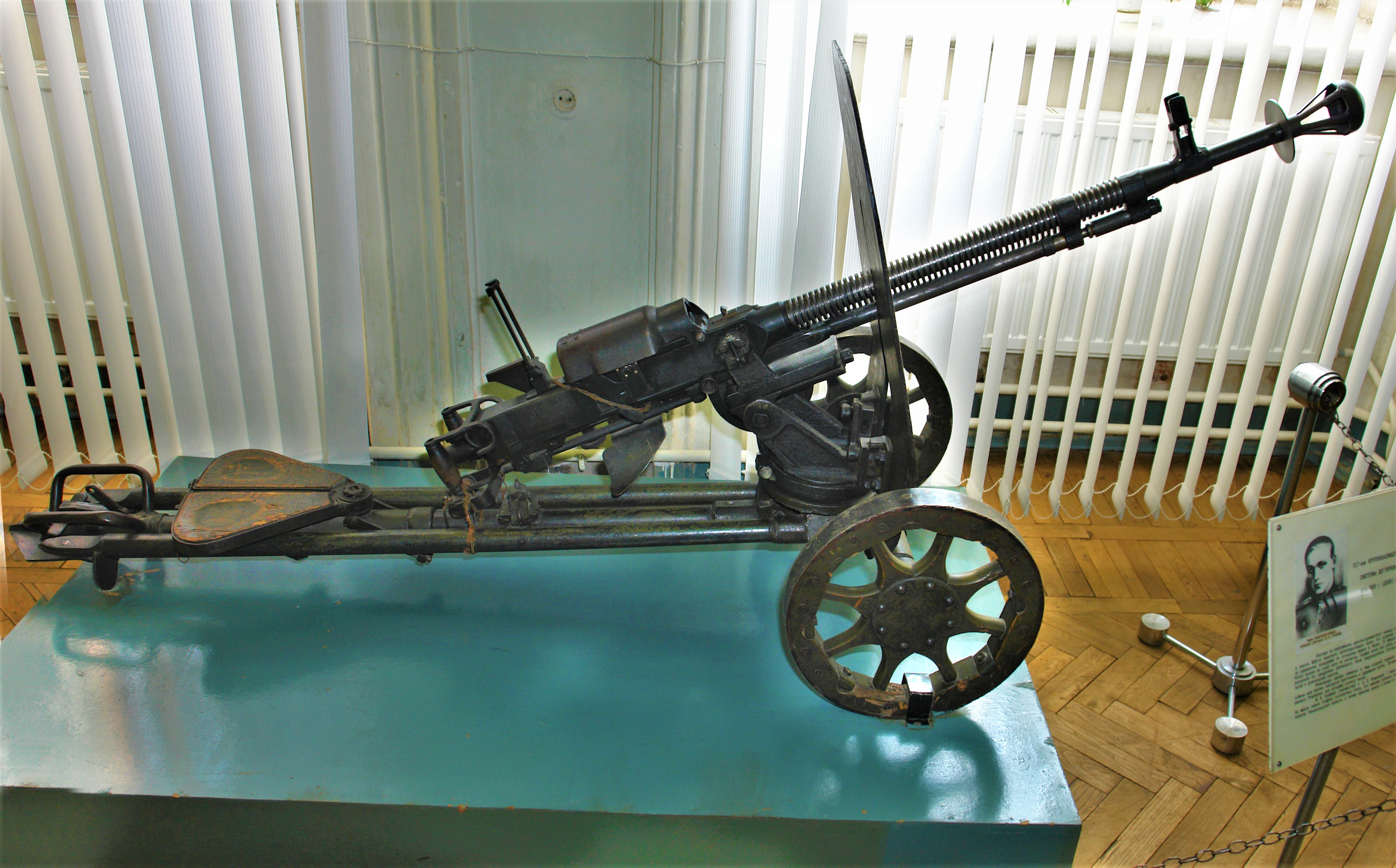
The DShK M1938 in the Military Historical Museum of Artillery, Engineers and Signal Corps in Saint Petersburg

Requiring a heavy machine gun similar to the M2 Browning, development of the DShK began in the Soviet Union in 1929 and the first design was finalised by Vasily Degtyaryov in 1931. The initial design used the same gas operation from the Degtyaryov machine gun, and used a 30-round drum magazine, but had a poor rate of fire. Georgy Shpagin revised the design by changing it to a belt-fed with a rotary-feed cylinder, and the new machine gun began production in 1938 as the DShK 1938. The DShK and the American M2 Browning are the only .50 caliber machine guns designed prior to World War II that remain in service to the present day.

During World War II, the DShK was used by the Red Army, with a total of 9,000 produced during the war. It was used mostly in anti-aircraft roles on vehicles such as the GAZ-AA truck, IS-2 tank, ISU-152 self-propelled artillery, and the T-40 amphibious tank. Similar to the PM M1910 Maxim, when deployed against infantry, the DShK was used with a two-wheeled trolley, with which the machine gun weighed a total of 346 pounds (157 kg). In 1944, a much cheaper muzzle brake patterned after the Polish Wz. 35 anti-tank rifle was introduced instead of the complicated early design. After 1945, the DShK was exported widely to other countries in the Eastern Bloc.

In 1946, an improved variant was produced, with a revised muzzle and feeding system. Named the DShK 38/46 or DShK-M, over a million were produced from 1946 to 1980. The gun was also revised to become more reliable, and easier to manufacture. The new DShK was produced under license in Pakistan, Iran, Yugoslavia, Romania, Poland and Czechoslovakia. Czechoslovak variant, most often encountered on quads, is visually distinguishable by a rectangular muzzle brake. China produced their own variant of the design, designated the Type 54.

After World War II, DShKs were used widely by communist forces in Vietnam, starting with the Battle of Dien Bien Phu in 1954. While not as powerful as anti-aircraft cannons, the DShK was easier to smuggle through Vietnam, Cambodia and Laos. DShKs were a major threat to American aircraft in the Vietnam War, and of the 7,500 helicopters and fixed-wing aircraft lost during the war, most were shot down and destroyed by anti-aircraft guns including DShK.

In June 1988, during The Troubles, a British Army Westland Lynx helicopter was hit 15 times by two Provisional IRA DShKs smuggled from Libya, and forced to crash-land near Cashel Lough Upper, south County Armagh.

Rebel forces utilized DShKs in the Syrian civil war, often mounting the gun on cars. In 2012, the Syrian government claimed to have destroyed 40 such technicals on a highway in Aleppo and six in Dael.

The DShK began to be partially replaced in the Soviet Union by the NSV machine gun in 1971, and the Kord machine gun in 1998. The DShK remains in service, although it is no longer produced.

The weapon was used by Ukrainian forces in the 2022 Russian invasion of Ukraine to shoot down Iranian-made Shahed-136 drones. The DShKs are fitted with a searchlight when defending against drones, which MANPADS have been unable to destroy. As many of the DShKs have been left over from the Soviet Union, they have been both cost-effective and one of the most reliable methods of destroying drones.

== Variants ==
- DShK-38: the original version of the DShK.
- DShK 38/46: a modernized version of the DShK 38 introduced in 1946. The weapon is commonly referred to simply as the DShKM.
- Vz.38/46: a Czechoslovak license version of the DShKM whose feeding mechanism was modified to allow the breech to be loaded from left or right and allow twin or quad mount.
- Type 54: a copy of the DShKM illegally produced by Norinco of China, which continues to be manufactured under Norinco's license in Pakistan and Iran.
- MGD-12.7: a Type 54 variant produced by Iran.

== Users ==
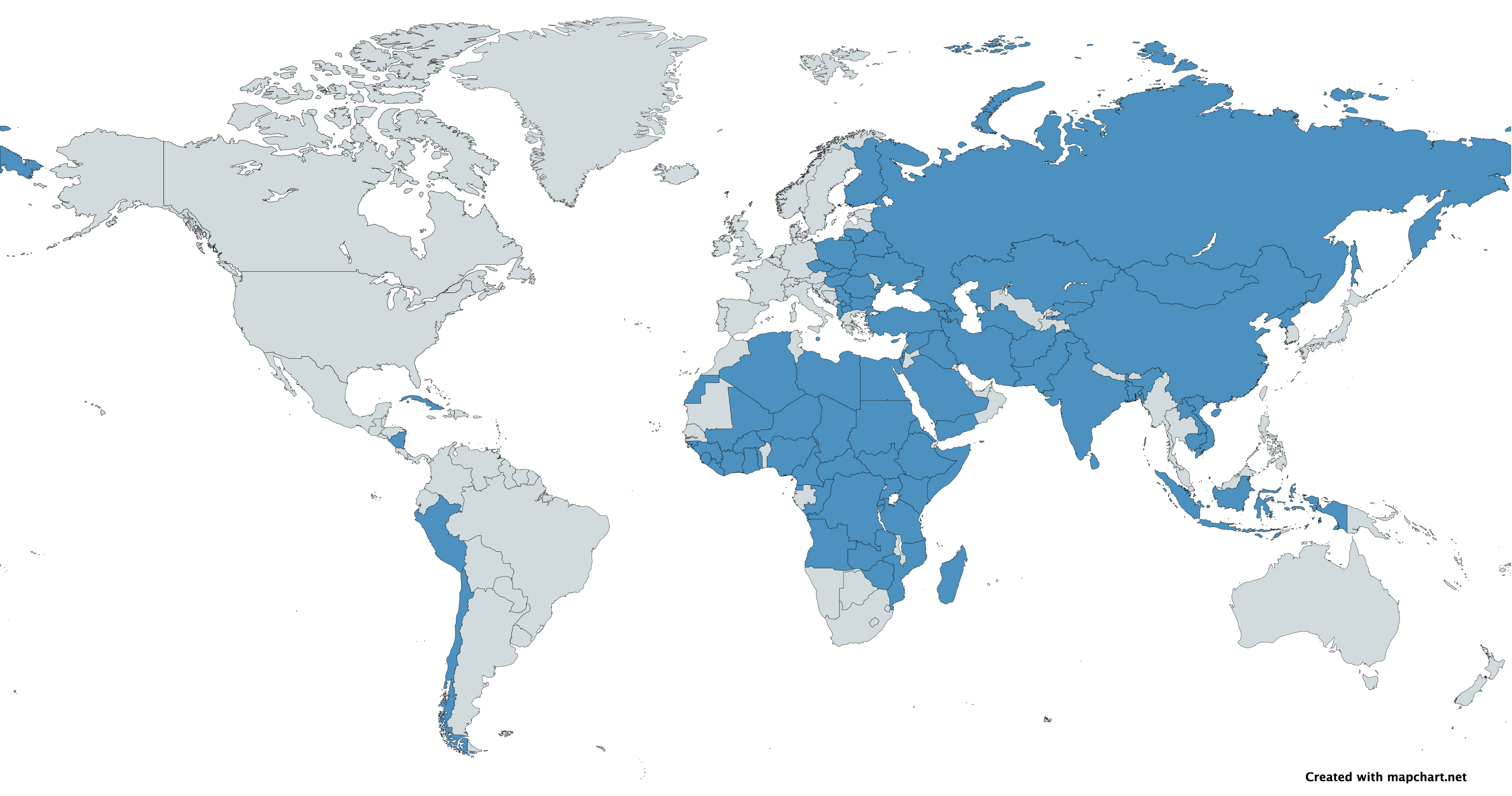
Map with DShK users in blue

- Afghanistan
- Albania "DShKM" locally produced from a Chinese copy.
- Algeria
- Angola
- Armenia
- Azerbaijan
- Bangladesh Type 54.
- Belarus
- Bulgaria
- Burkina Faso
- Burundi
- Cambodia
- Cameroon
- Cape Verde
- Central African Republic
- Chad
- Chile
- China: Produced DShKM variant Type 54.
- Congo-Brazzaville
- Congo-Kinshasa
- Cuba
- Cyprus
- Czech Republic
- Egypt
- Equatorial Guinea
- Eritrea
- Ethiopia
- Finland
- Georgia
- Ghana
- Guinea
- Guinea-Bissau
- Hungary
- Indonesia
- Iran: Manufactured DShKM variant named MGD 12.7.
- Iraq called the "Doshka" by Iraqis.
  - Kurdistan Region
- Israel
- Ivory Coast
- Kazakhstan
- Kenya
- Kyrgyzstan
- Laos
- Liberia
- Libya
- Lithuania
- North Macedonia
- Madagascar
- Mali – Armed and Security Forces of Mali
- Malta
- Mongolia
- Mozambique
- Nicaragua
- Nigeria
- North Korea
- North Vietnam
- Pakistan: Used by the Pakistan Army. DShKM variant produced locally.
- Peru
- Poland: Produced locally.
- Romania Produced locally (still used with TR-85 tanks).
- Russia
- Serbia
- Seychelles
- Sierra Leone
- Slovakia
- Somalia
- Sahrawi Arab Democratic Republic
- South Sudan
- Syria
- Tanzania
- Togo
- Turkey
- Turkmenistan
- Uganda
- Ukraine: Also produces a variant with a bipod and large muzzle brake for infantry usage.
- Vietnam
- Yemen
- Zambia
- Zimbabwe

=== Former users ===
- Czechoslovakia: Produced DShKM variant TK Vz.53 which included a four barrelled version.
- East Germany
- Soviet Union: Passed on to successor states.
- Yugoslavia: Manufactured DShKM variant.

=== Non-state users ===
- Islamic State
- National Guard (Suwayda)
- Provisional IRA
- Syrian Democratic Forces

== Gallery ==
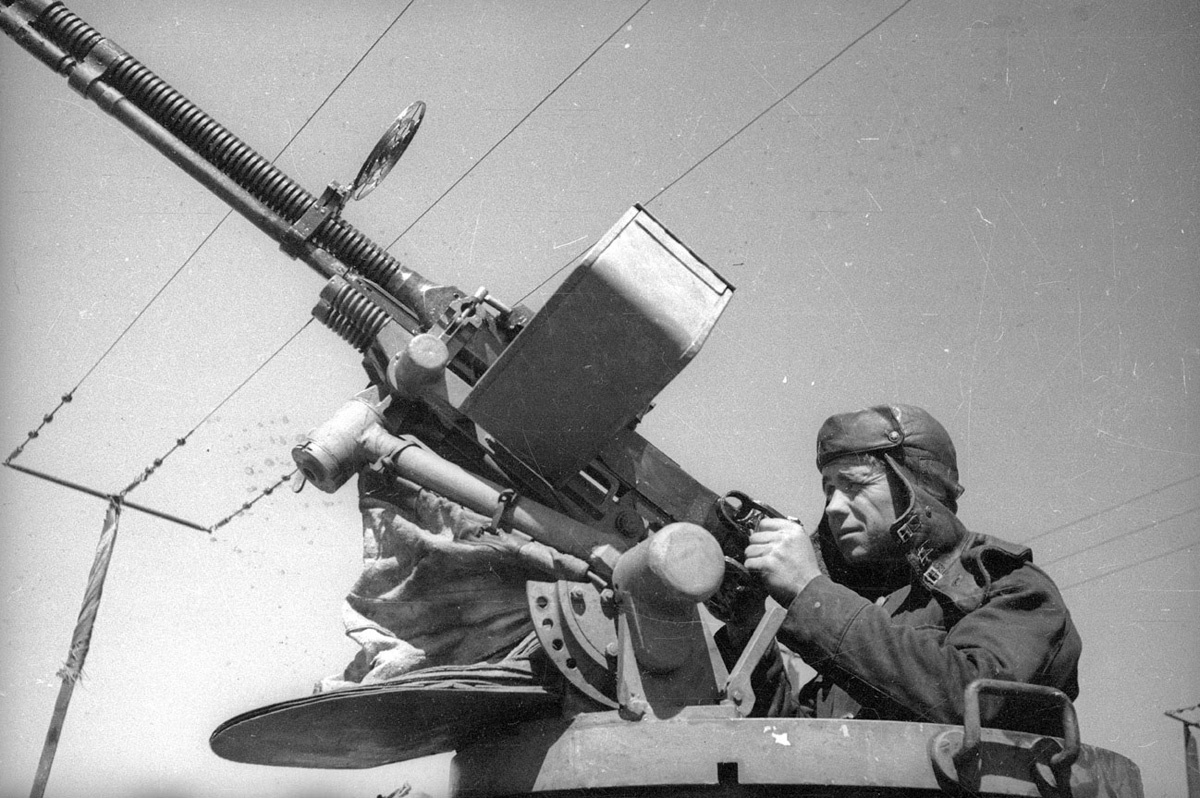
A Soviet G-5-class motor torpedo boat armed with the DShK machine gun on the MTU-2 ring mount, 1944

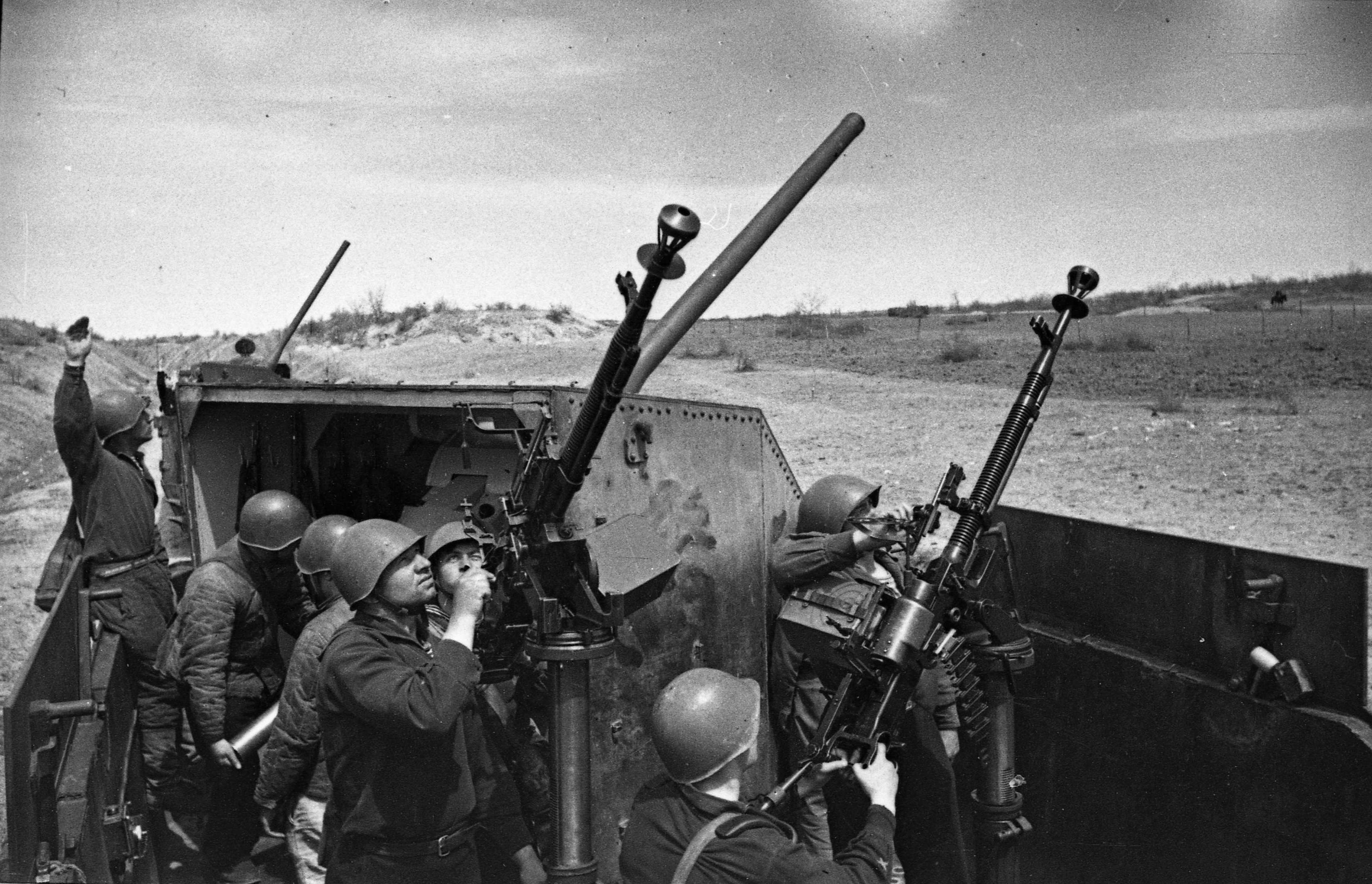
The DShK anti-aircraft machine guns mounted on the Soviet armoured train Zhelezniakov, May 1942

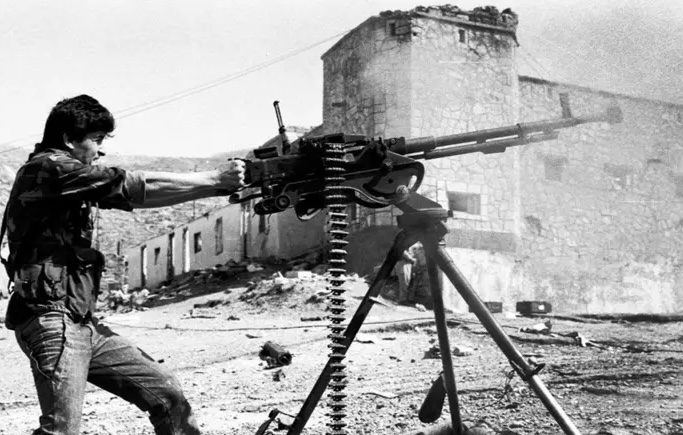
A Kurdish fighter firing the DShK during the 1991 Iraqi uprising

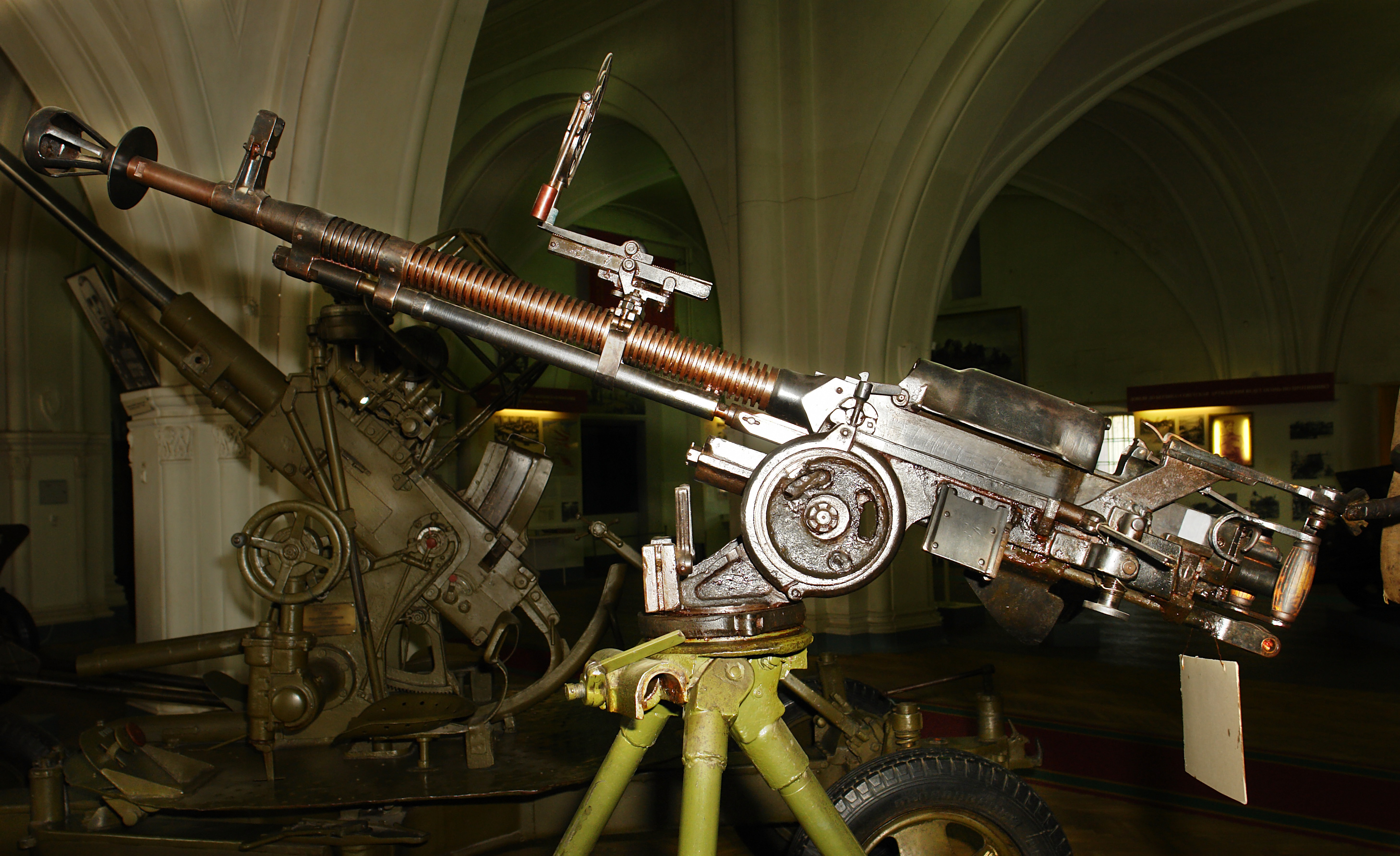
The WW2-era DShK M1938 anti-aircraft machine gun in the Artillery Museum (Saint Petersburg)

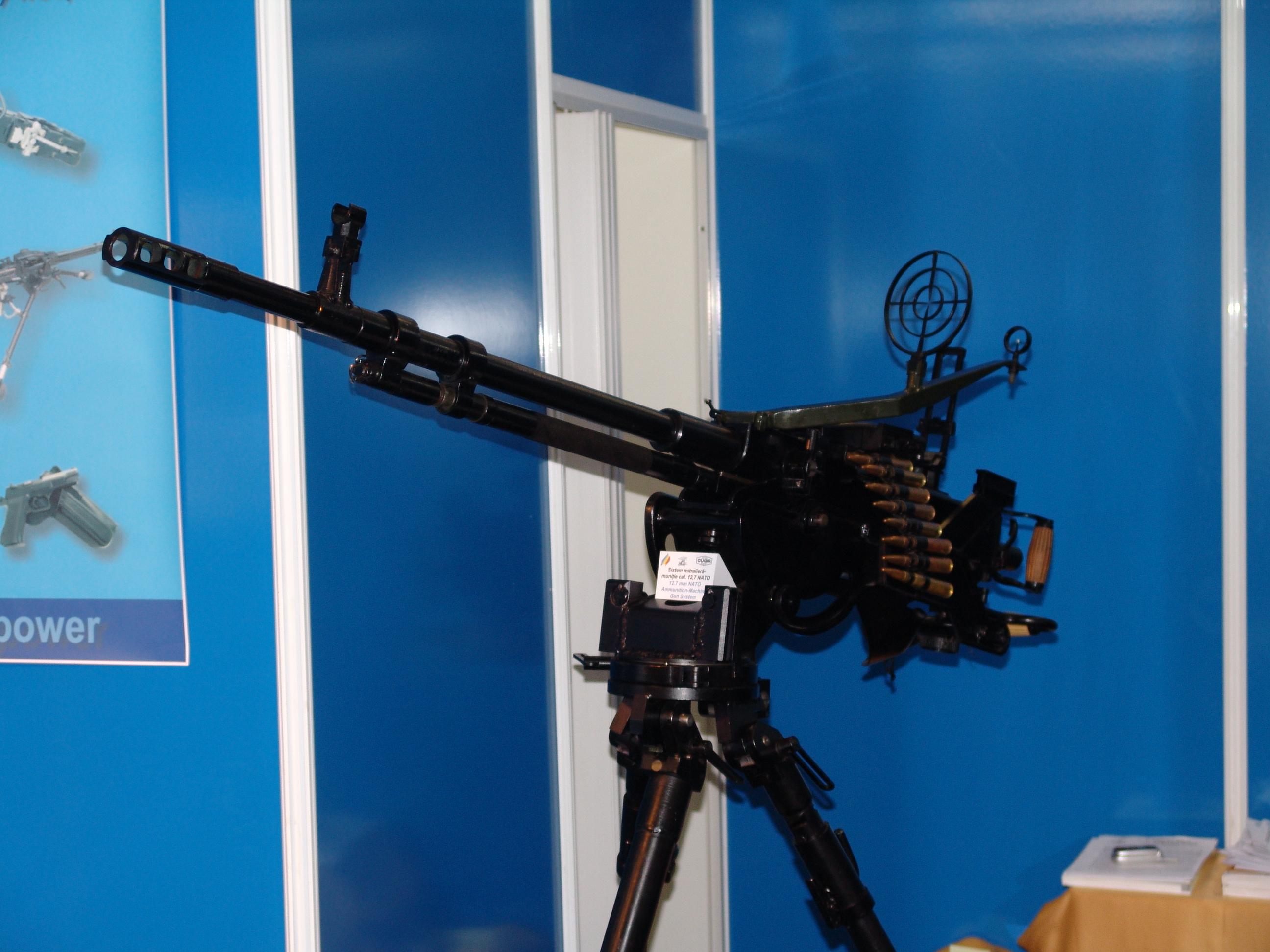
A Romanian DShK chambered in 12.7×99mm NATO on display at Expomil 2005

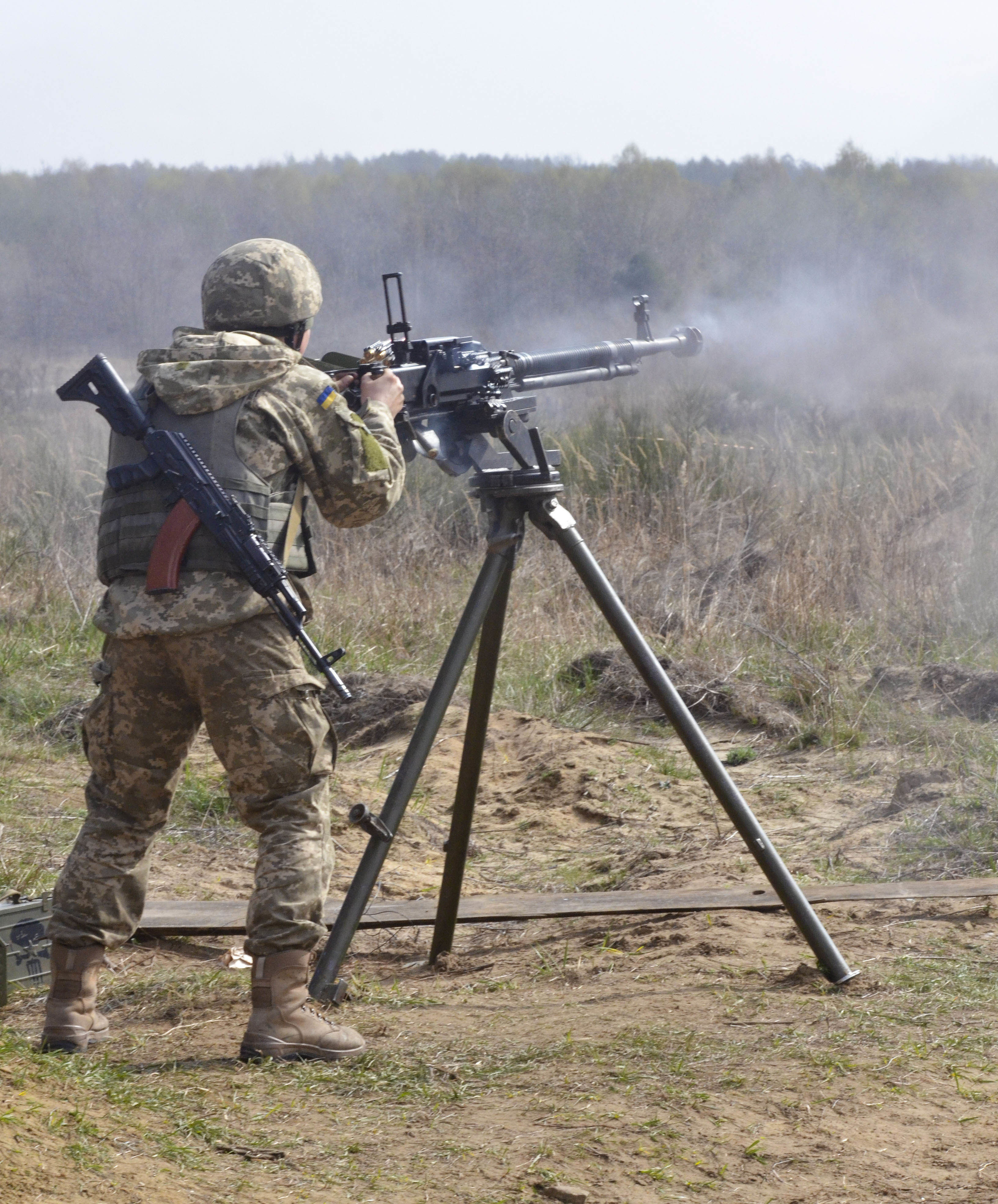
A soldier with the Ukrainian Land Forces fires a DShKM

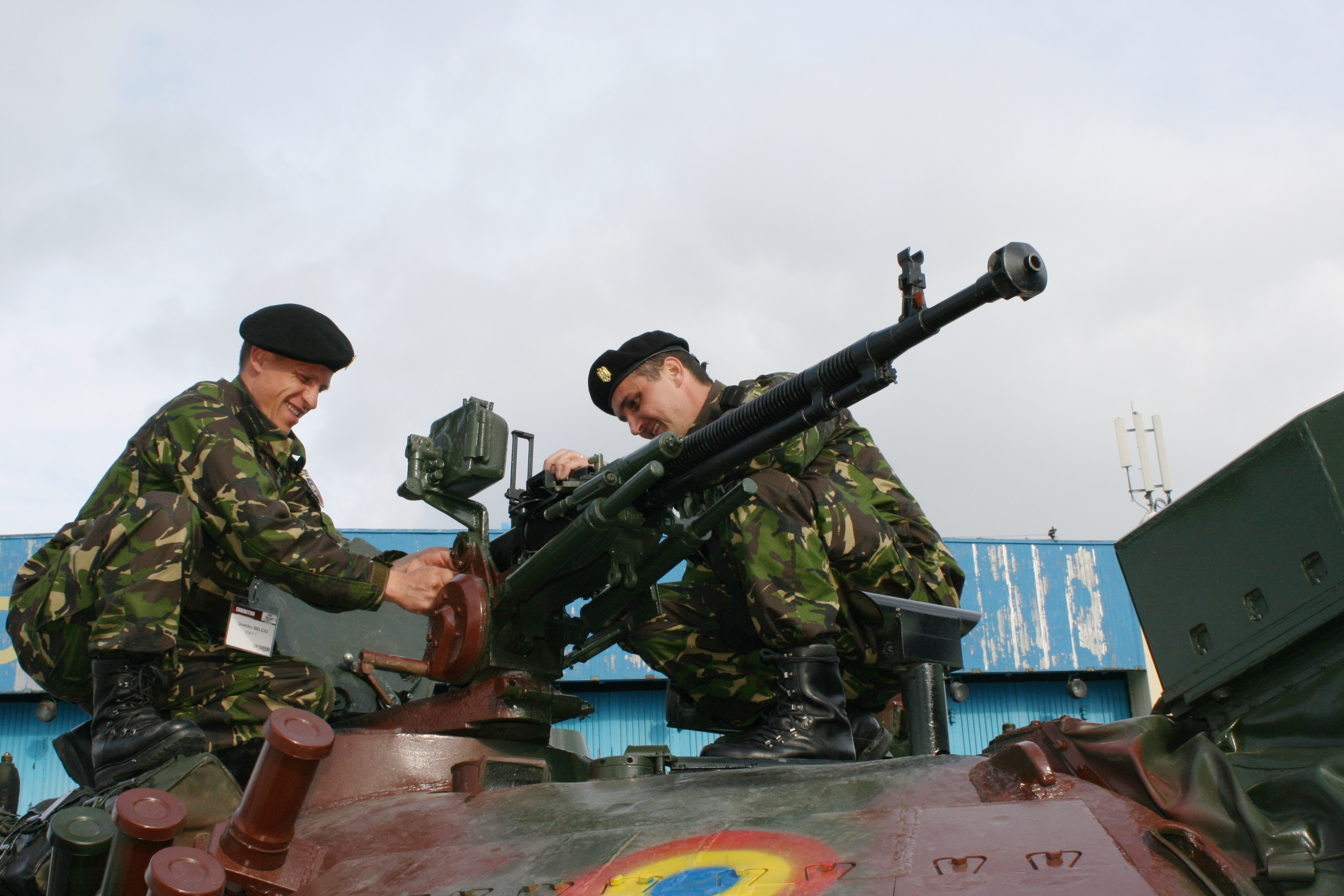
DShKM TR-85M1

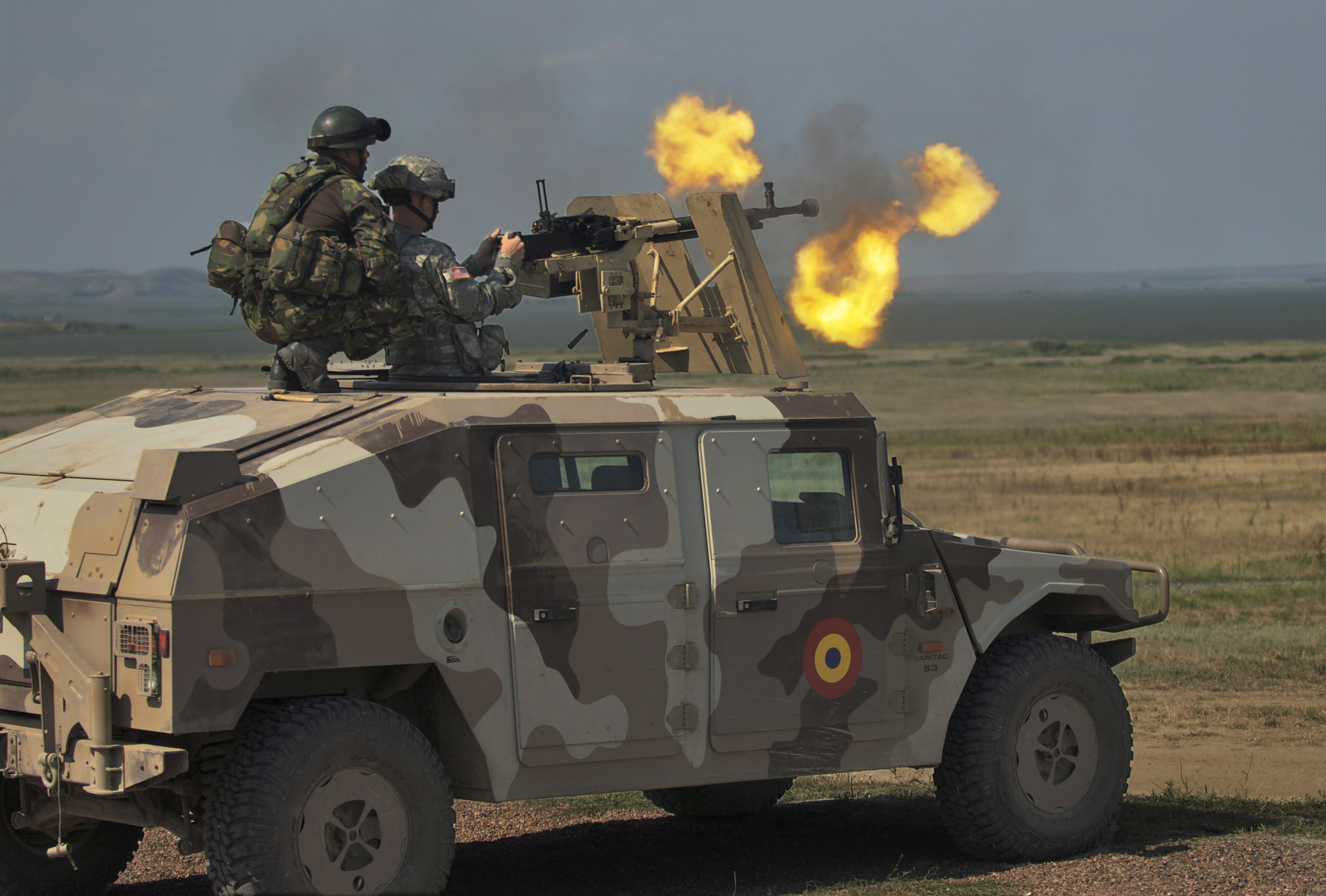
DShKM URO VAMTAC

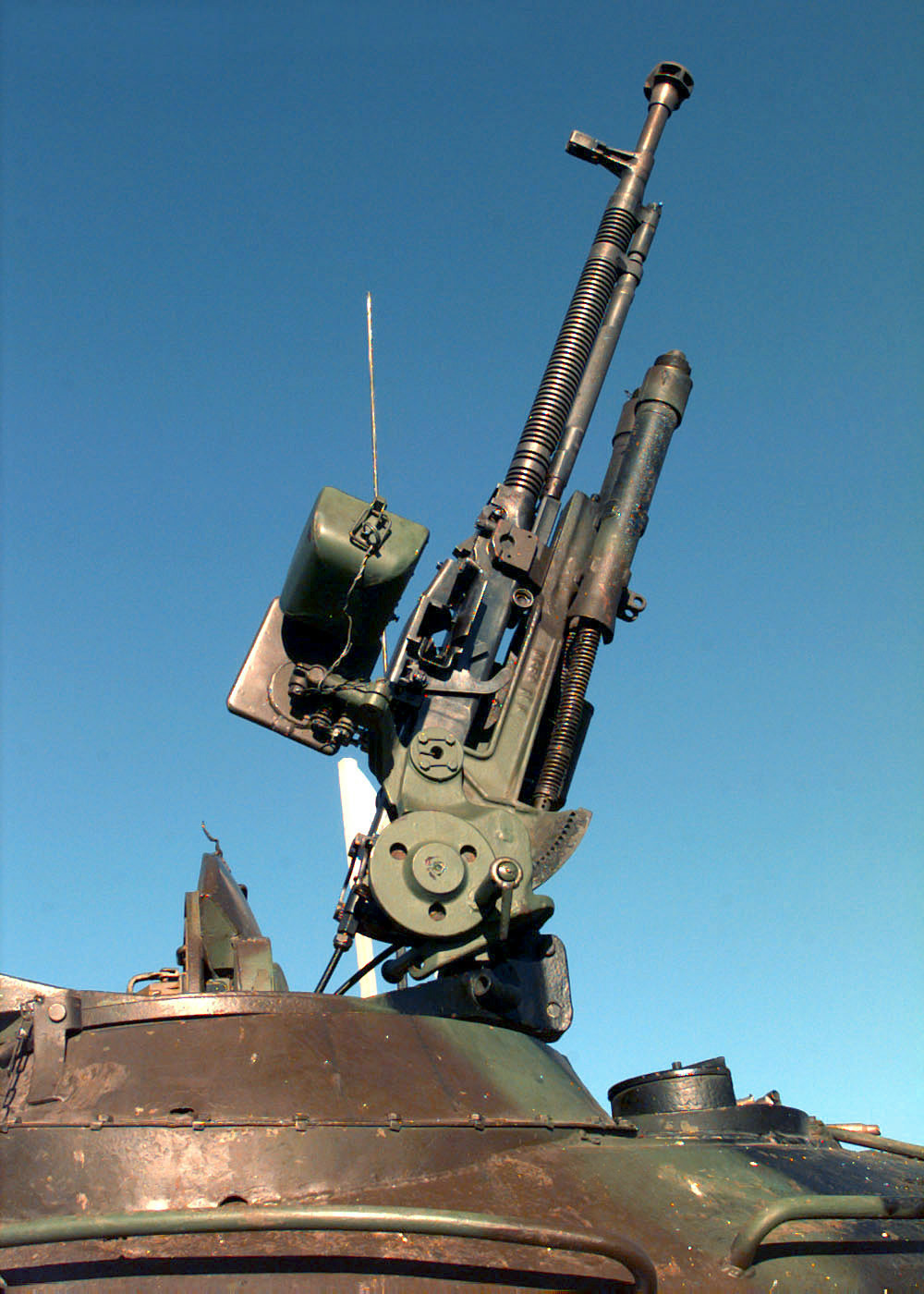
DShKM anti-aircraft machine gun on a T-55 tank loader's roof hatch

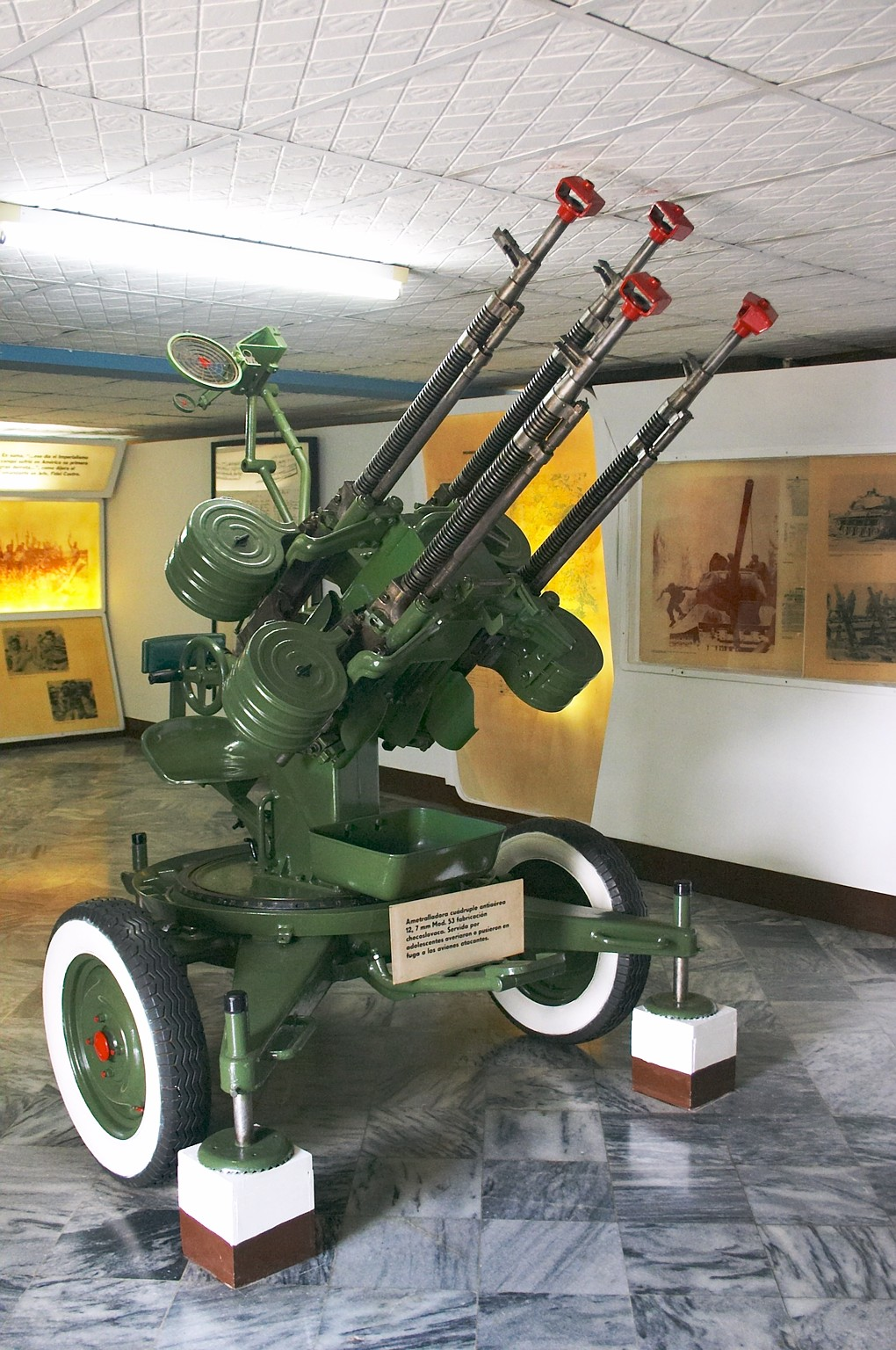
The M53 is an anti-aircraft mounting of four 12.7 mm heavy machine guns vz. 38/46 (Czech copy of Soviet DShKM)

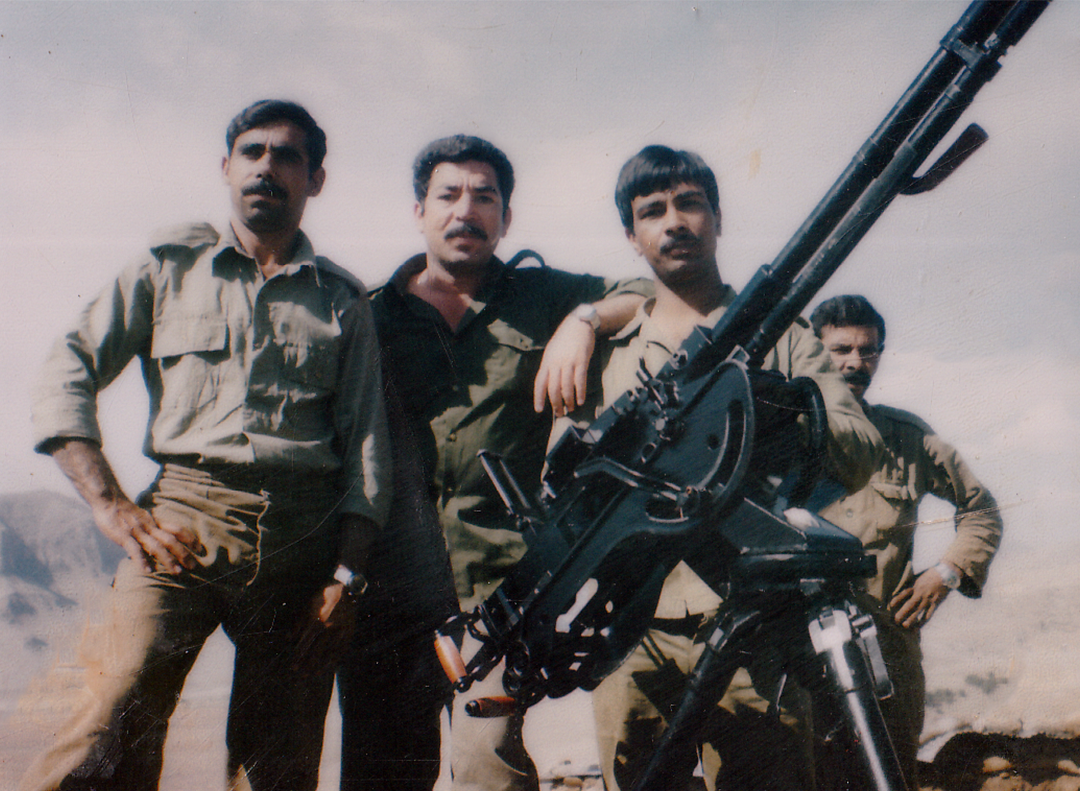
Iraqi soldiers stand next to DShk during Iran–Iraq War

== See also ==
- FN BRG-15
- HMG PK-16
- KPV heavy machine gun
- List of Russian weaponry
