= PPSh-41 =

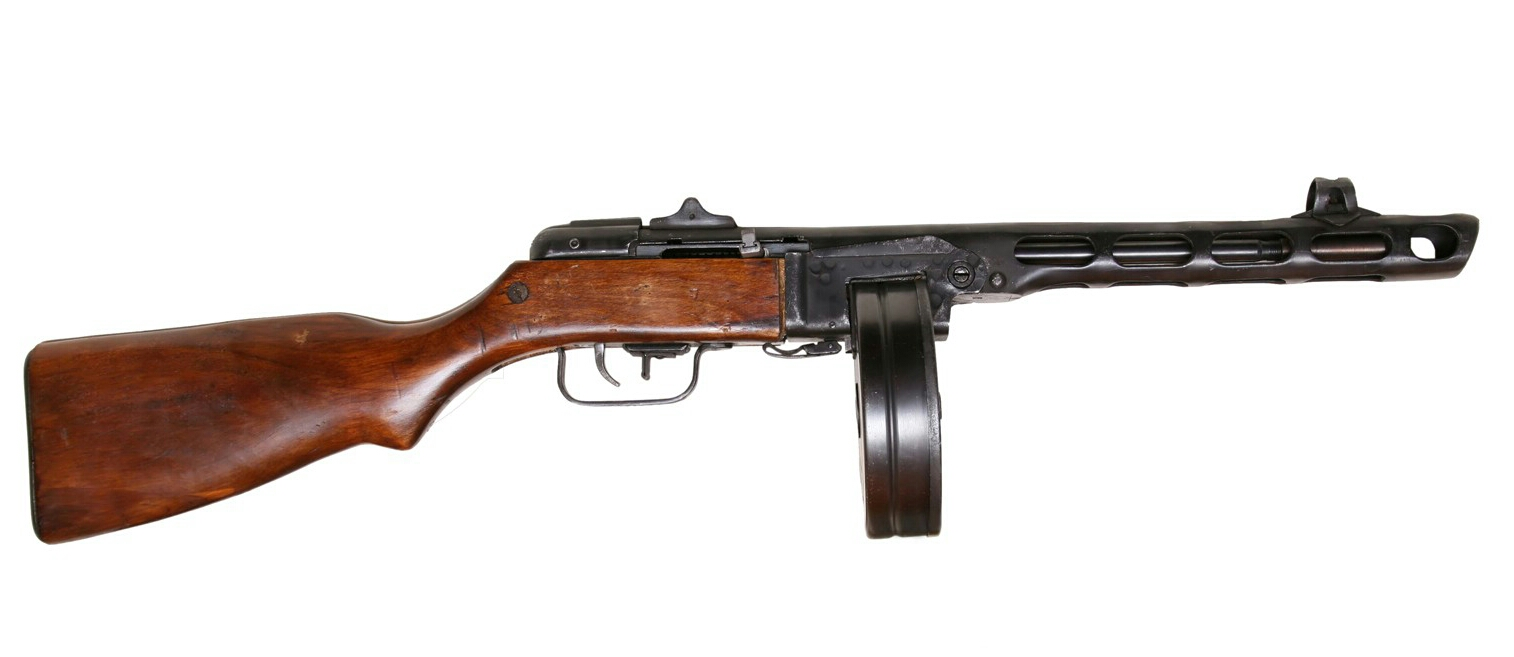
- PPSh-41 with a 71-round drum magazine
- Type: Submachine gun
- Place of origin: Soviet Union

Service history
- In service: 1941–present
- Used by: See Users
- Wars: World War II; First Indochina War; Malayan Emergency; Korean War; Hungarian Revolution of 1956; Portuguese Colonial War; Bay of Pigs Invasion; Vietnam War; Rhodesian Bush War; Yom Kippur War; Lebanese Civil War; Soviet–Afghan War; Somali Civil War; Yugoslav Wars; Iraq War; Syrian civil war; Russo-Ukrainian War

Production history
- Designer: Georgy Shpagin
- Designed: 1941
- Manufacturer: Numerous
- Produced: 1941–1947 (USSR) Mid 1940s–present (Other countries)
- No. built: Approx. 6,000,000
- Variants: See Variants

Specifications
- Mass: 3.63 kg (8.0 lb) (without magazine)
- Length: 843 mm (33.2 in)
- Barrel length: 269 mm (10.6 in)
- Cartridge: 7.62×25mm Tokarev; 7.63×25mm Mauser; 9×19mm Parabellum (captured German versions)
- Action: Blowback, open bolt
- Rate of fire: 1,250 RPM
- Muzzle velocity: 488 m/s (1,600.6 ft/s)
- Effective firing range: 150 m - 200 m
- Feed system: 35-round box magazine or 71-round drum magazine 32-round box magazine (captured German versions)
- Sights: Iron sights

The PPSh-41 (Russian: Пистоле́т-пулемёт Шпа́гина-41, romanized: Pistolét-pulemyót Shpágina-41, lit. 'Shpagin's machine-pistol-41') is a selective-fire, open-bolt, blowback submachine gun that fires the 7.62×25mm Tokarev round. It was designed by Georgy Shpagin in the Soviet Union to be a cheaper and simplified alternative to the PPD-40.

The PPSh-41 saw extensive combat during World War II and the Korean War. It became one of the major infantry weapons of the Red Army during World War II, with about six million PPSh-41s manufactured during the period.

The firearm is made largely of stamped steel, and can be loaded with either a box or drum magazine.

== History ==
=== World War II ===
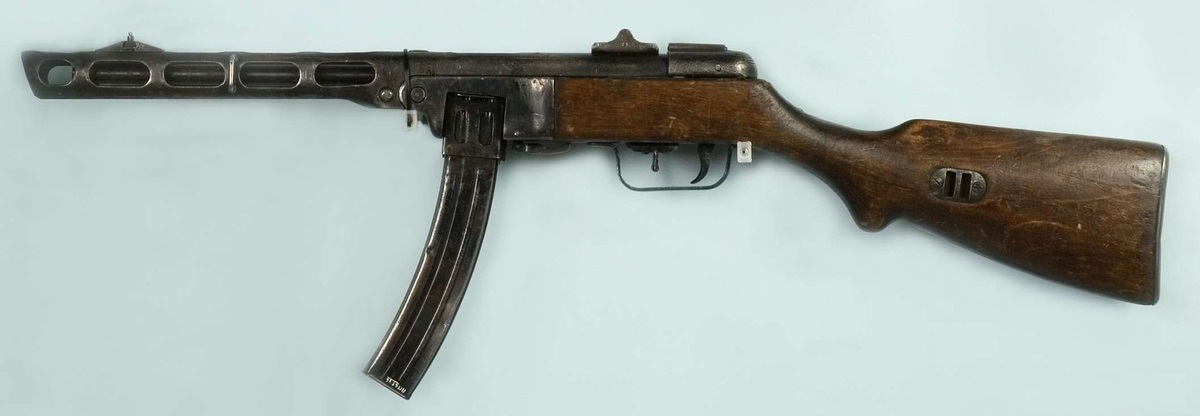
A 1942 PPSh-41 with a 35-round box magazine

The impetus for the development of the PPSh came from the Winter War (November 1939 to March 1940) between the Soviet Union and Finland, when the Finnish Army employed the Suomi KP/-31 submachine gun as a highly effective tool for close-quarter fighting in forests and built-up urban areas. The Red Army's older PPD submachine gun had been in production since 1934, but it was expensive to manufacture, both in terms of material and labor, as it used numerous milled metal parts (particularly for its receiver). The firearm-designer Georgy Shpagin wanted to reduce costs by using metal stamping for the production of the parts. In September 1940 Shpagin developed a prototype PPSh which also featured a simple gas-compensator designed to prevent the muzzle from rising during bursts; this improved shot grouping by about 70% relative to the PPD.

The new weapon was produced in a network of factories in Moscow, with high-level local Party members made directly responsible for meeting production-targets. A few hundred weapons were produced in November 1941 and another 155,000 were made during the next five months. By spring 1942, the PPSh factories were producing roughly 3,069 units a day. Soviet production figures for 1942 indicate an output of almost 1.5 million units.

The PPSh-41 uses 87 components (compared to 95 for the PPD-40), and the PPSh could be manufactured with an estimated 5.6 machining hours (later revised to 7.3 hours) compared with 13.7 hours for the PPD. Barrel production was often simplified by using barrels for the 7.62mm Mosin–Nagant: the rifle barrel was cut in half and two PPSh barrels were made from it after machining the chamber for the 7.62×25mm Tokarev cartridge.

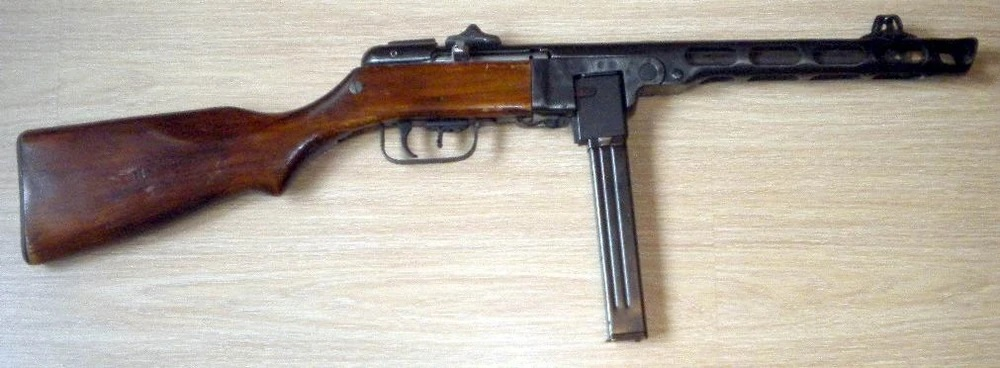
A MP 41(r) conversion with a MP 40 magazine inserted

After the German Army captured large numbers of the PPSh-41 in the course of the German-Soviet War of 1941-1945, Berlin instituted a program to convert the trophy weapons to use the standard German submachine-gun cartridge – the 9×19mm Parabellum. The Wehrmacht officially adopted the converted PPSh-41 as the "MP 41(r)" (not to be confused with the Schmeisser MP41); unconverted PPSh-41s were designated "MP 717(r)" and supplied with 7.63×25mm Mauser ammunition. German-language manuals for the use of captured PPShs were printed and distributed in the Wehrmacht. In addition to barrel replacement, converted PPSh-41s also had a magazine adapter installed, allowing them to use MP 40 magazines. The less powerful 9mm round generally reduces the cyclic rate of fire from 800 to 750 RPM. (Modern aftermarket conversion-kits based on the original Wehrmacht one also exist, using a variety of magazines, including Sten magazines.)

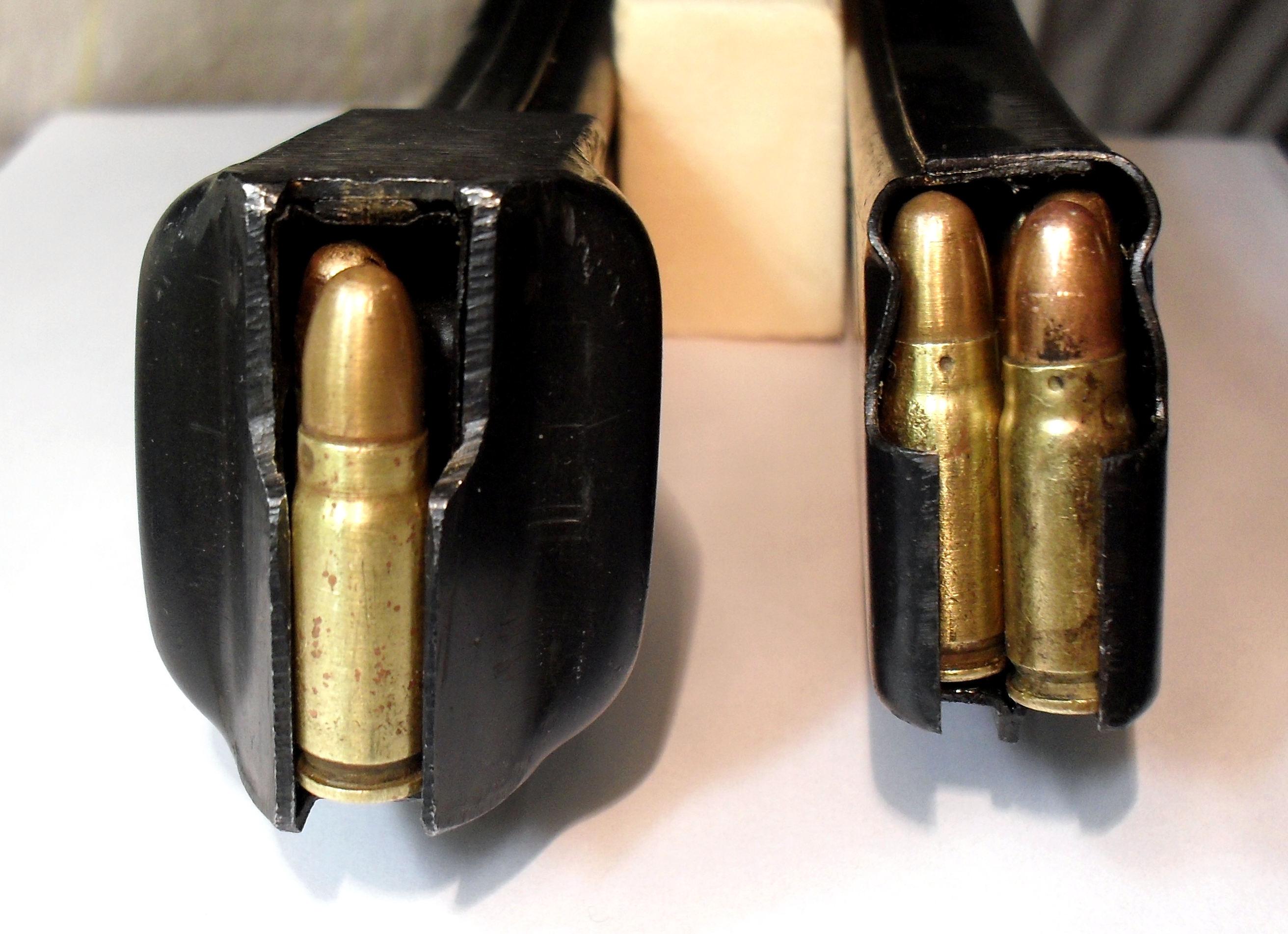
PPSh (left) compared to PPS (right) box magazine

As standard, each PPSh-41 came with two factory-fitted drum magazines, matched to the weapon with marked serial-numbers. If drum magazines were mixed and used with different serial-numbered PPSh-41, a loose fitting could result in poor retention and failure to feed. Drum magazines were superseded by a simpler PPS-42 box-type magazine holding 35 rounds, although an improved drum magazine made from 1 mm thick steel was also introduced in 1944.

In 1943 the Red Army introduced the PPS-43, which was even simpler in its design than the PPSh-41 and had a more moderate rate of fire, but it did not fully replace the PPSh-41 during the war.

The Soviet Union also experimented with the PPSh-41 in a close air support antipersonnel role, mounting 88 of the submachine guns in forward fuselage racks on the Tu-2Sh variant of the Tupolev Tu-2 bomber.

The USSR had produced more than five million PPSh-41 submachine guns by the end of World War II. The Red Army would often equip platoons − and sometimes entire companies − with the weapon, giving them excellent short-range firepower. Thousands were dropped behind enemy lines in order to equip Soviet partisans to disrupt Axis operations, supply-lines and communications.

=== Korean War ===
US Marines using a captured PPSh-41 during the Korean War in September 1950.

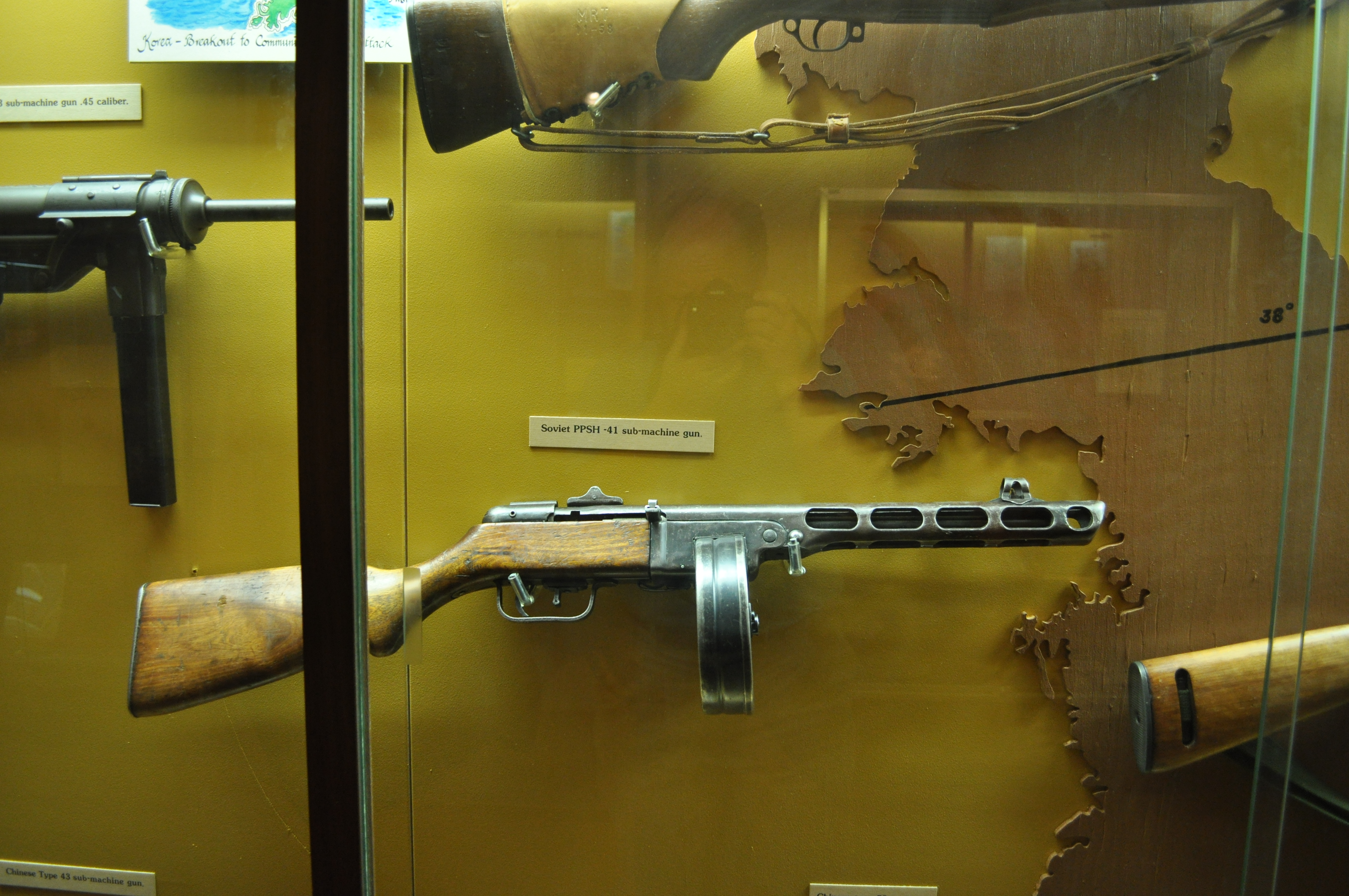
Soviet PPSh-41 submachine gun, Fort Lewis Military Museum, Fort Lewis, Washington, US – part of a display of the weapons of the Korean War

After the Second World War, the USSR supplied the PPSh in large quantities to Soviet-aligned states and to Communist guerrilla forces. During the Korean War of 1950 to 1953, North Korea's Korean People's Army (KPA) and the Chinese People's Volunteer Army (PVA) fighting in Korea received large numbers of the PPSh-41, in addition to the North Korean Type 49 and the Chinese Type 50 - each licensed copies of the PPSh-41 with small mechanical revisions.

Though relatively inaccurate, the Chinese PPSh has a high rate of fire and was well-suited to the close-range firefights that typically occurred in Korea, especially at night. United Nations Command forces in defensive outposts or on patrol often had trouble returning a sufficient volume of fire when attacked by companies of infantry armed with the PPSh. Some US infantry officers ranked the PPSh as the best combat-weapon of the war: while lacking the accuracy of the US M1 Garand and M1 carbine, it provided more firepower at short distances. Infantry captain (later general) Hal Moore, stated: "on full automatic it sprayed a lot of bullets and most of the killing in Korea was done at very close ranges and it was done quickly – a matter of who responded faster. In situations like that it outclassed and outgunned what we had. A close-in patrol fight was over very quickly and usually we lost because of it." Other US servicemen felt that their M2 carbines were superior to the PPSh-41.

== Features ==
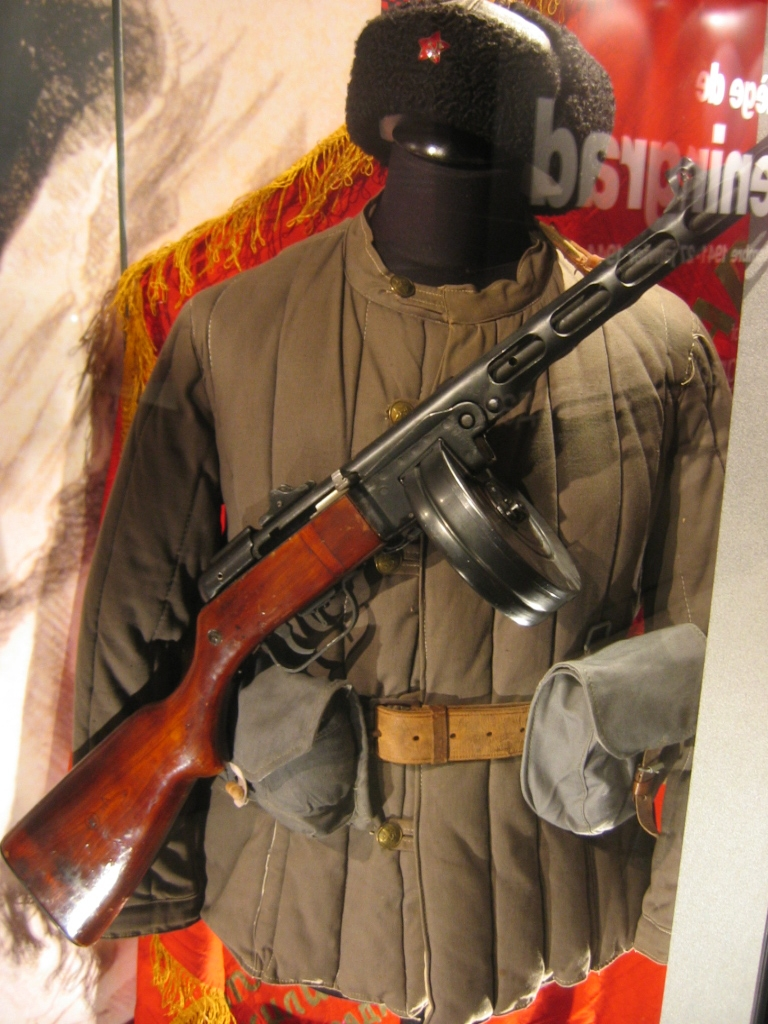
A PPSh-41 on display

The PPSh-41 fires the standard Soviet pistol and submachine gun cartridge, the 7.62×25mm Tokarev. Weighing approximately 12 pounds (5.45 kg) with a loaded 71-round drum and 9.5 pounds (4.32 kg) with a loaded 35-round box magazine, the PPSh is capable of a rate of about 1250 rounds per minute, a very high rate of fire in comparison to most other military submachine guns of World War II. It is a durable, low-maintenance weapon made of low-cost, easily obtained components, primarily stamped sheet metal and wood. The final production PPShs have top ejection and an L type rear sight that can be adjusted for ranges of 100 and 200 meters. A crude compensator is built into the barrel jacket, intended to reduce muzzle climb during automatic fire. The compensator was moderately successful in this respect, but it greatly increased the muzzle flash and report of the weapon. The PPSh also has a hinged receiver to facilitate field-stripping and cleaning the weapon.

A chrome-lined bore enables the PPSh to withstand both corrosive ammunition and long intervals between cleaning. No forward grip or forearm was provided, and the operator generally has to grasp the weapon behind the drum magazine with the supporting hand, or else hold the lower edge of the drum magazine. Though 35-round curved box magazines were available from 1942, the average Soviet infantryman in World War II carried the PPSh with the original 71-round drum magazine.

Although the PPSh drum magazine holds 71 rounds, misfeeding is likely to occur with more than about 65. In addition to feed issues, the drum magazine is slower and more complicated to load with ammunition than the later 35-round box magazine that increasingly supplemented the drum after 1942. While holding fewer rounds, the box magazine does have the advantage of providing a superior hold for the supporting hand. Although the PPSh is equipped with a sliding bolt safety, the weapon's open-bolt design still presents a risk of accidental discharge if the gun is dropped on a hard surface.

== Users ==
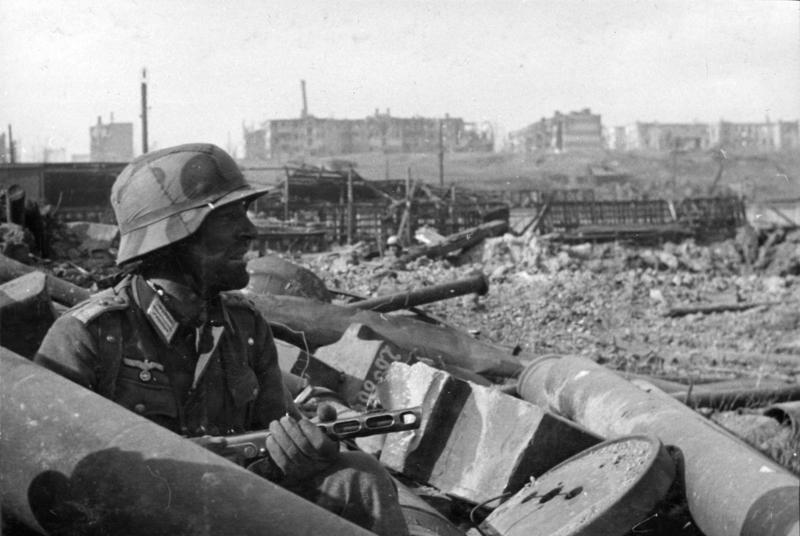
German Army soldier armed with a PPSh-41 in Stalingrad during the autumn of 1942.

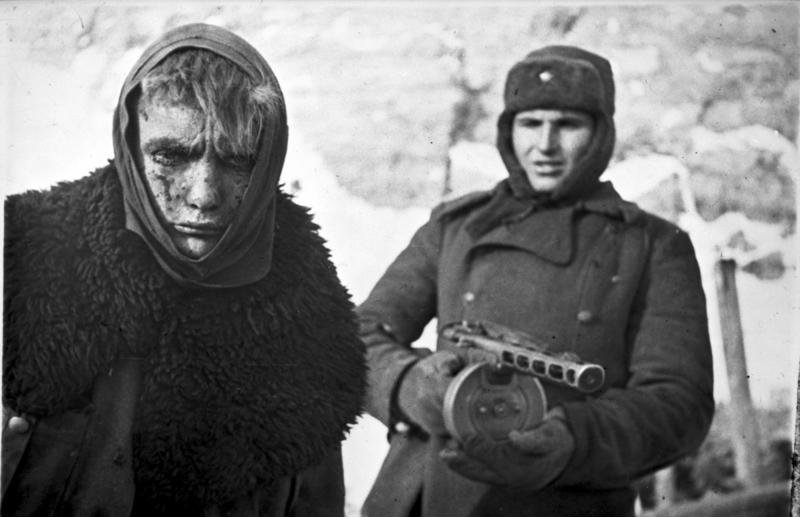
A Red Army soldier armed with a PPSh-41 marches a German soldier into captivity after the Battle of Stalingrad, 1943.

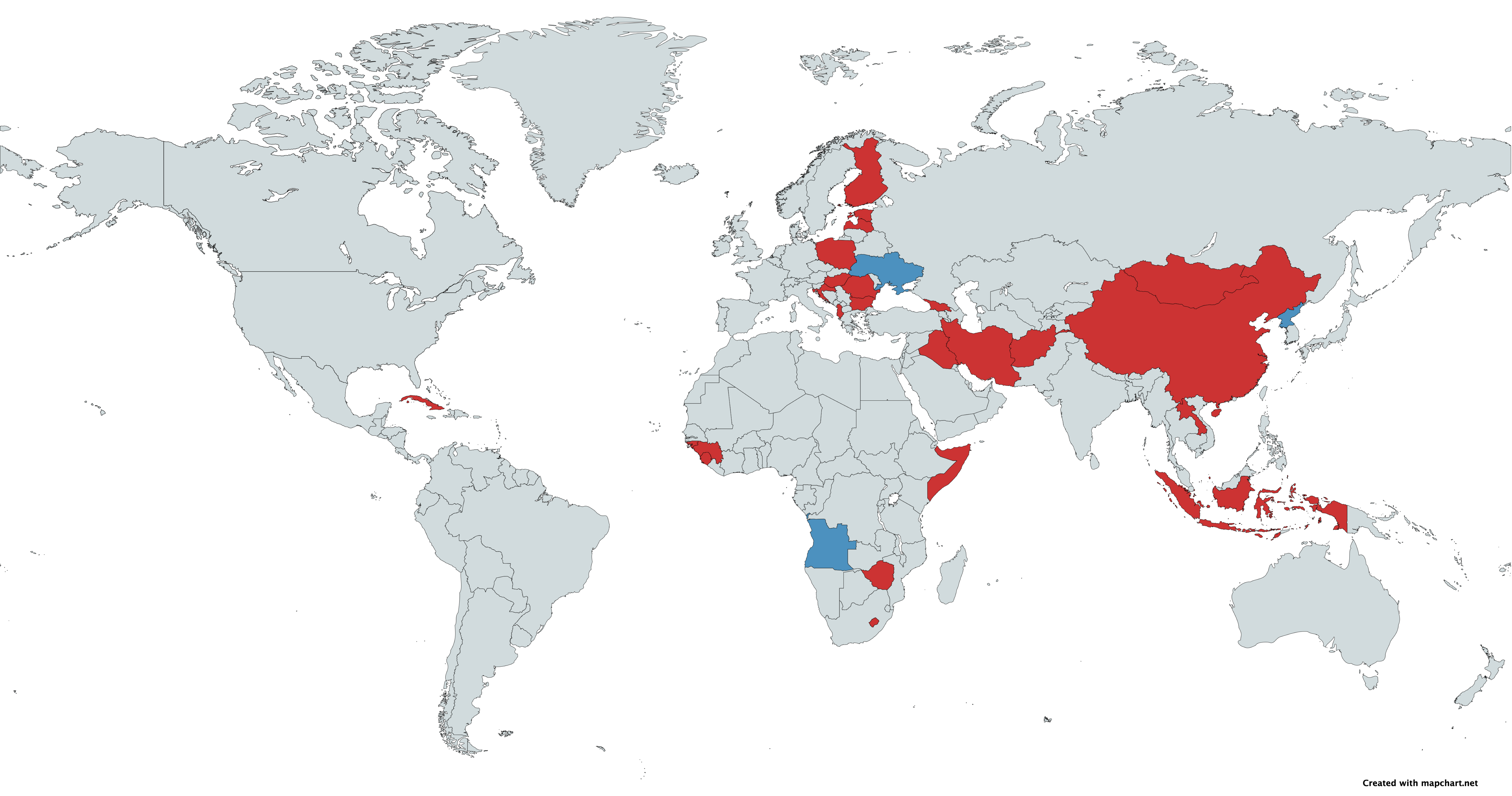
A map with users of the PPSh-41 in blue and former users in red

=== Current ===
- North Korea − Licensed copies under the designation "Type 49". Used by the Worker-Peasant Red Guards
- Russian separatist forces in Ukraine − Limited usage in the beginning of the war in Donbas.
- Syrian opposition − Limited usage in the Syrian civil war
- Ukraine − As of 2011, 300,000 were stored in Ministry of Defense warehouses.

=== Former ===
- Afghanistan − Formerly in service with the Afghan Army, until the 1980s. Also used by various pro PDPA civilian militias.
- Albania
- Angola − Used by MPLA forces during the Angolan War of Independence.
- Austria Soviet origin. Used by some motorcycle riders as the "MP-41". Replaced by the STG-77.
- Bulgaria
- China − Made licensed copies under the designation "Type 50".
- Croatia
- Cuba
- Czechoslovakia − Used during World War II
- East Germany − Used by the Border Troops of the German Democratic Republic and the Combat Groups of the Working Class. This weapon became iconic due to its presence during the construction of the Berlin Wall in the hands of both units. Designated "MPi41" in East German service, the PPSh-41 was gradually replaced by the AK-47 beginning in 1960.
- Estonia − Estonian partisans used captured SMGs against the Soviets in 1941.
- Ethiopia
- Finland − At least 2,500 were captured and used during the Continuation War.
- Georgia − Used during civil conflicts in 1990s.
- Guinea
- Guinea Bissau − Used by the PAIGC in the Guinea-Bissau War of Independence
- Hungary − Captured and reissued PPSh-41s in the early 1940s. Produced a local version in the early 1950s called the "7.62mm Géppisztoly 48.Minta", or simply "48m".
- Indonesia
- Iran − In January 1943, the Iranian government and the Soviet Union signed a deal to produce the PPSh-41 in Iran under license and deliver a number of those submachine guns to the Soviet Union. Limited numbers of the PPSh-41 were produced and the production line was closed before World War Two ended. After the end of the war unknown numbers were produced and were used by Shahrbani and the military. The local version used a tangent rear sight.
- Iraqi insurgents
- Italian Partisans − Used examples captured from German soldiers
- Laos
- Latvia − Used by Latvian partisans against Soviets in 1940s.
- (Lebanon) Lebanese National Movement
- Lesotho
- Malayan National Liberation Army − Used by MNLA supplied by Soviet Union only small numbers
- Mongolia
- Nazi Germany − Used captured guns, and also converted some to 9×19mm Parabellum under the designation "MP-41(r)" and the 7.63x25mm Mauser under the designation "MP-717(r)"
- North Vietnam − Viet Minh, Viet Cong and North Vietnamese Army used PPSh-41 variants, including the K-50M license-built copy, and the Chinese Type 50.
- Poland − It was used by the First Polish Army. After the war, it was made under license as the "7.62 mm pm wz.41" by Łucznik Arms Factory.
- Romania − Captured and reissued PPSh-41 submachine guns during 1941–1944. Made licensed copies during the 1950s at Cugir Arms Plant under the designation "PM PPȘ Md. 1952".
- Sierra Leone
- Somalia
- South Korea − Captured from the communist forces during the Korean War. Also operated regeneration facility at the arsenal in Busan.
- Soviet Union − In service with the Soviet Army in 1942.
- Syria− Used during the Yom Kippur War
- Yugoslavia
- United States - Limited ad-hoc use during the Korean War.
- Zimbabwe

== Variants ==
- Type 50: Chinese-made variant of the PPSh-41. A US ordnance report during the Korean War stated that this version could not accept drum magazines. However, that report turned out to be mistaken.
- Type 49: North Korean-made variant of the PPSh-41 with a different shaped stock. This model accepts box and drum-based magazines.

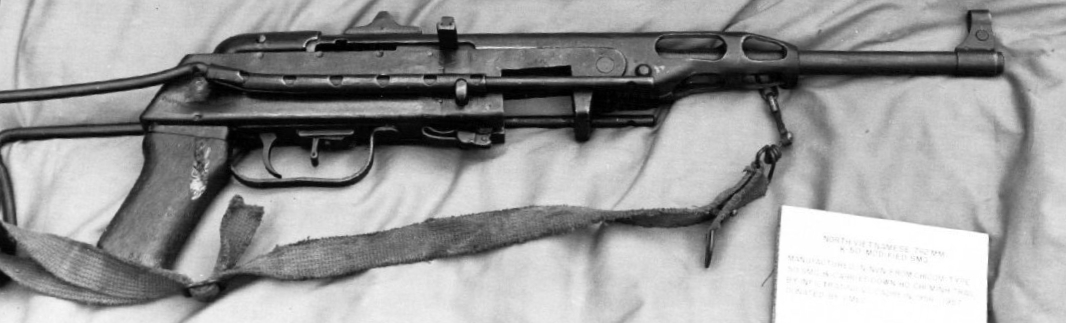
K-50M submachine gun, captured from the NVA

- K-50M: A North Vietnamese-modified submachine gun based on the Type 50s supplied by China during the Vietnam War. Produced between 1958 and 1964. The chief difference is that the cooling sleeve of the K-50 was truncated to three inches (76 mm), and the front sight is based on the AK-47 front sight. Modifications include the addition of a full pistol grip, a steel wire-made stock and the shortened barrel. The changes resulted in a weight of 3.4 kg (7.5 lb), making K-50M lighter than the PPSh-41 by 500 g (1.1 lb). The weapon uses a 35-round stick magazine, but the 71-round drum magazine can be used if the stock is fully extended.
- MP41(r): designation for captured PPSh-41s converted to 9×19mm Parabellum caliber for use by German forces during World War II.
- MP717(r): designation for captured PPSh-41s placed in German service during World War II. Supplied with 7.63×25mm Mauser ammunition
- Šokac: A Croatian version of the PPSh-41, produced in the 1990s for use in the Croatian War of Independence. Using a metal folding stock and a square receiver, outwardly it does not resemble a PPSh-41, but mechanically the gun is a copy of that weapon. The Šokac was produced because Croat forces lacked arms and therefore turned to manufacturing simple weapons domestically.
- PPSh-45: A late war variant of PPSh-41, featuring only full auto and using early PPSh-41 production tangent sights. It had a foldable stock that could also be used as a grip, and had no wood parts.

== Bibliography ==
- Campbell, David (2016). Israeli Soldier vs Syrian Soldier: Golan Heights 1967–73. Bloomsbury Publishing. ISBN 978-1-4728-1331-2.
- Hogg, Ian (2000). Jane's Guns Recognition Guide (2nd ed.). Glasgow: Janes'. ISBN 0-00-472453-4.
- McNab, Chris (2014). Soviet Submachine Guns of World War II: PPD-40, PPSh-41 and PPS. Weapon 33. Osprey Publishing. ISBN 978-1-78200-794-4.
- Mitzer, Stijn; Oliemans, Joost (2020). The Armed Forces of North Korea: On the Path of Songun. Helion and Company. ISBN 978-1910777145.
- Venter, Al J. (2017). Battle For Angola: The End of the Cold War in Africa c 1975-89. Helion and Company. ISBN 978-1-913118-10-5.
