= Sukhanikha =

Sukhanikha Суханиха
- Village
- Location within Vladimir Oblast Location within Russia
- Coordinates: 56°18′N 41°09′E
- Country: Russia
- Region: Vladimir Oblast
- District: Kovrovsky District
- Time zone: UTC+3:00

Sukhanikha (Russian: Суханиха) is a rural locality (a village) in Novoselskoye Rural Settlement, Kovrovsky District, Vladimir Oblast, Russia. The population was 33 as of 2010.

== Geography ==
Sukhanikha is located on the Klyazma River, 16 km southwest of Kovrov (the district's administrative centre) by road. Sychyovo is the nearest rural locality.
