= Georgy Shpagin =

Soviet weapons designer (1897–1952)

Georgy Semyonovich Shpagin
- Георгий Семёнович Шпагин
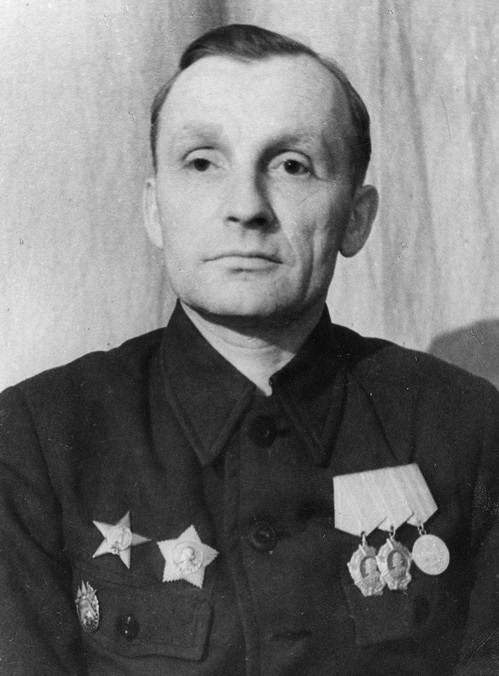
- Shpagin in February 1945
- Born: 17 April 1897; Klyushnikovo, Russian Empire
- Died: 6 February 1952 (aged 54); Moscow, Russian SFSR, Soviet Union
- Burial place: Novodevichy Cemetery, Moscow, Russia
- Military career
- Allegiance: Russian Empire (1916–1917); Soviet Union (1917–1952)
- Branch: Imperial Russian Army; Red Army
- Known for: Designing the PPSh-41
- Conflicts: World War I; Eastern Front; World War II; Eastern Front
- Awards: Hero of Socialist Labour (1945)

Georgy Semyonovich Shpagin (Russian: Георгий Семёнович Шпагин; 17 April 1897 – 6 February 1952) was a Soviet weapons designer. He is best-known as the creator of the PPSh-41, a submachine gun that saw widespread use by the Red Army on the Eastern Front. He also worked with fellow Soviet weapons designer Vasily Degtyaryov on the DShK, a heavy machine gun, shortly before the start of World War II.

== Early life ==
Shpagin was born on 17 April 1897 to a Russian family in Klyushnikovo, close to Kovrovo, in what was then the Russian Empire. He attended school for three years before becoming a carpenter at the age of 12 (in 1909).

== World War I and Russian Revolution ==
In 1916, Shpagin was drafted into the Imperial Russian Army to fight on the Eastern Front. The following year, he was assigned to repair artillery. After the October Revolution, he joined the Red Army and worked as a gunsmith in Vladimir Oblast. After 1920, he was at a workshop designing weapons in the same area, working with Soviet weapons designers Vladimir Grigoryevich Fyodorov and Vasily Degtyaryov.

== World War II ==
After nearly a decade and a half of unsuccessful attempts, his workshop released the DShK in 1938. It is still in widespread use as an anti-personnel gun, an anti-aircraft gun, and a light anti-tank weapon. During World War II, about 8,000 units of Shpagin's DShK were produced by the Soviet Union. In 1940, he came up with his most accredited design: the PPSh-41, which would go on to become the staple automatic weapon used by the Red Army on the Eastern Front. The PPSh-41 was a favoured design because it was cheap to produce and easy to maintain at a time when the national arms demand was exceptionally high due to Germany's invasion of the Soviet Union. In 1944, Shpagin became a member of the Communist Party. He, in competition with the AS-44, also created his own prototype assault rifle called the ASh-44, which was operated by a blowback system. However, the ASh-44 design was dropped from trial testing due to it being uncontrollable on full-auto firing, which led to the issuing of a mandate that all future rifle designs be locked breech.

== Political career and death ==
From 1946 until 1950, Shpagin was a member of the Supreme Soviet, the national legislative body. During this time, he became seriously ill and was diagnosed with stomach cancer. He died of the disease in February 1952 and was buried at Novodevichy Cemetery in the city of Moscow.

== Awards and honours ==
Shpagin was awarded the State Stalin Prize (Second Class) in 1941, and received the title "Hero of Socialist Labour" on 16 September 1945 for his "creation of new types of weapons and raising the combat power of the Red Army" through his acclaimed weapons designs. Additionally, he had received the Order of the Red Star in 1938 and the Order of Suvorov (Second Class) in 1945, in addition to three separate awards of the Order of Lenin (in 1941, 1943, and 1945).

== Posthumous recognition ==
In Russia, there are large public monuments dedicated to Shpagin in Kovrov and Vyatka, and there is also a street named after him in the latter city.
