= Automatic rifle =

Type of autoloading rifle

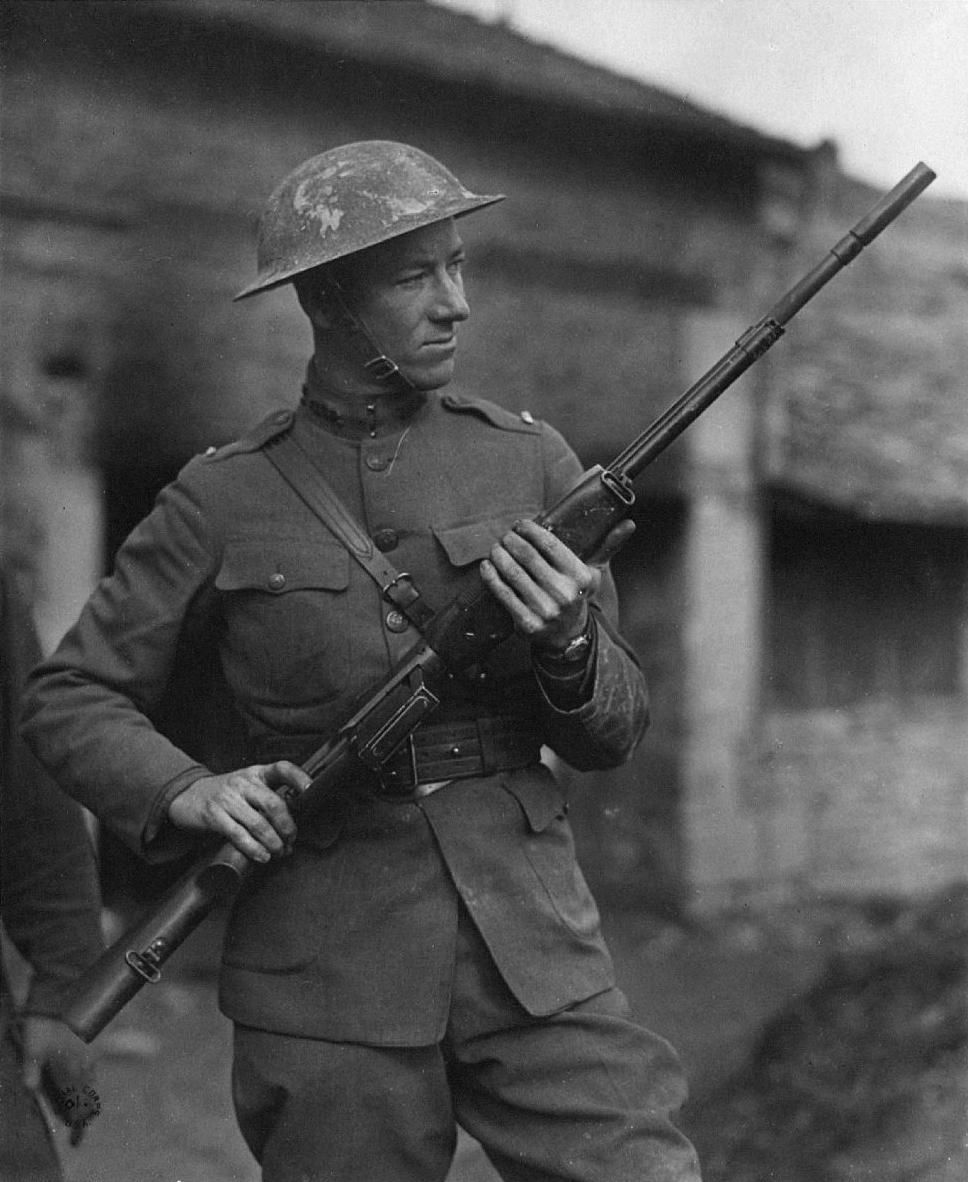
2nd Lt. Val A. Browning with a M1918 Browning automatic rifle in France during World War I

An automatic rifle is a type of autoloading rifle that is capable of fully automatic fire. Automatic rifles are generally select-fire weapons capable of firing in semi-automatic and automatic firing modes (some automatic rifles are capable of burst-fire as well). Automatic rifles are distinguished from semi-automatic rifles in their ability to fire more than one shot in succession once the trigger is pulled. Most automatic rifles are further subcategorized as battle rifles or assault rifles.

== History ==
=== Maxim ===
In June 1883 Hiram Maxim filed his first patent to do with automatic firearms covering semi-automatic and fully automatic Winchester and Martini-Henry rifles as well as an original automatic rifle and blowback- and recoil-operated machine guns, both single and multi-barrelled.

=== Mannlicher ===
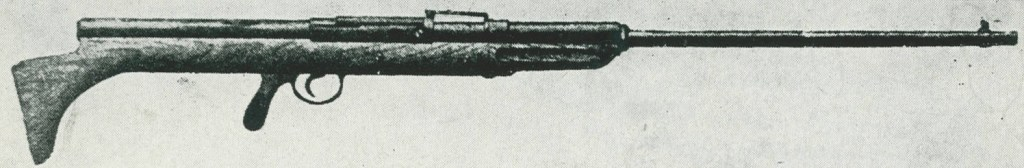
1885 Mannlicher Self-Loading Rifle

In 1885 Ferdinand Mannlicher made an experimental self-loader based on work begun in 1883 in both semi-automatic and fully automatic modes. It was an impractical failure due to fouling by its black powder ammunition, but it influenced later designs. Furthermore, Mannlicher produced smokeless powder automatic rifles from the early 1890s onwards until his death in 1904.

=== Cei-Rigotti ===
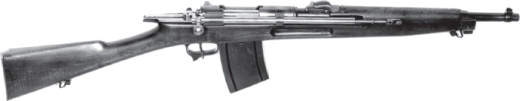
The Italian Cei-Rigotti, one of the world's first automatic rifles.

One of the world's first automatic rifles was the Italian Cei-Rigotti. This rifle started out as an 1891 gas-operated conversion of the Vetterli rifle, which received positive approval and was even adopted after further refinements in 1895 for the Royal Italian Navy, but although up to 2000 rifles were ordered, the order never came through for as yet unknown reasons. Another version of the Cei-Rigotti was presented in 1900, these 6.5mm Carcano or 7.65×53mm gas-operated, selective-fire carbines attracted considerable attention at the time. They used 10-, 20- and 50-round box magazines. The Cei-Rigotti had several failings, including frequent jams and erratic shooting. In the end, no Army took an interest in the design and the rifle was abandoned before it could be further developed. Although the rifle was never officially adopted by any military, aside from the 1895 variant which never came through, it was tested extensively by the Italian Army during the lead-up to the First World War.

=== Chauchat ===
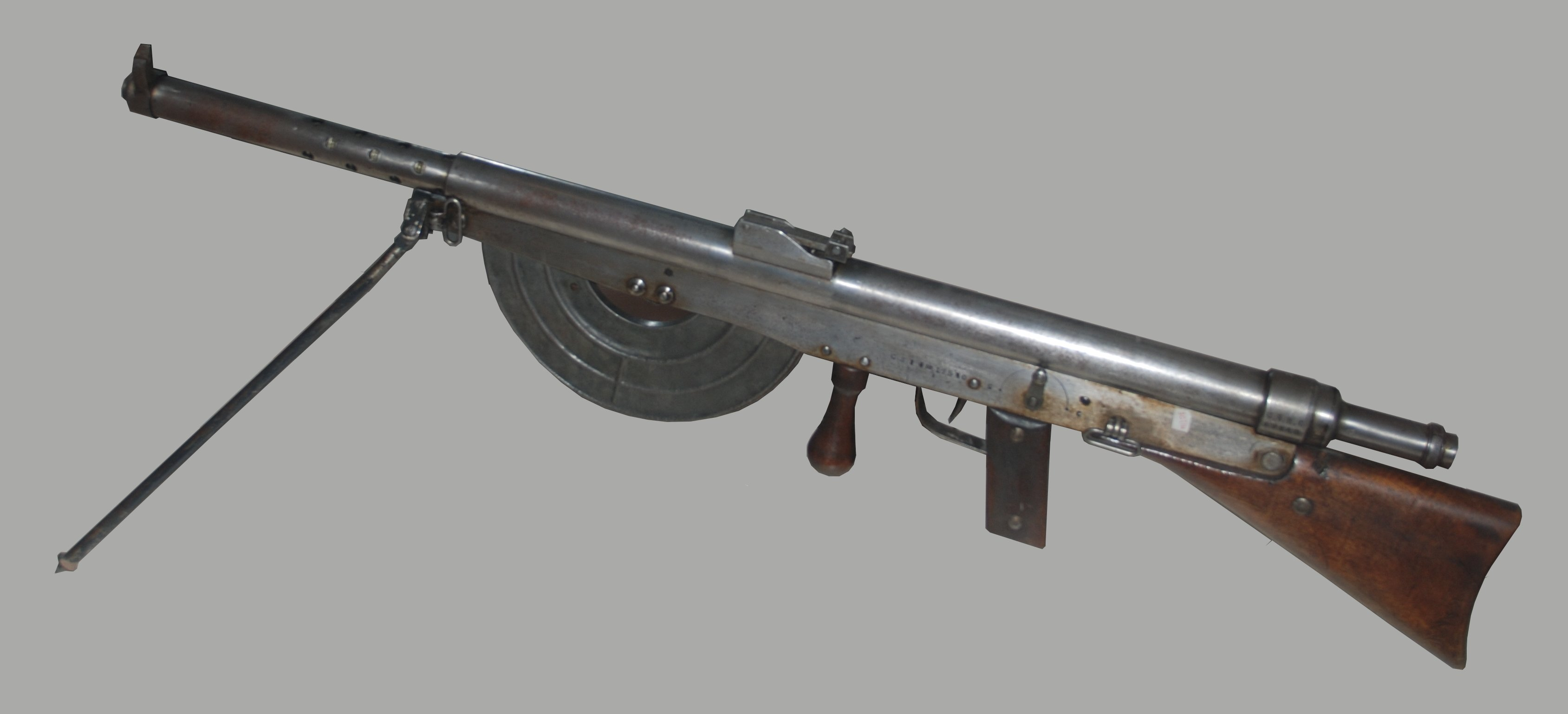
Chauchat Automatic Rifle

The Chauchat, designed in 1907, was one of the first automatic rifles to be adopted by a military. Its official design was the Fusil Mitrailleur Modele 1915 CSRG. It was placed into French Infantry in 1916, and was used by the French army in the First World War. The Chauchat in 8mm Lebel was also extensively used in 1917–18 by the American Expeditionary Forces (A.E.F.), where it was officially designated as the "Automatic Rifle, Model 1915 (Chauchat)".

=== Lewis Gun ===
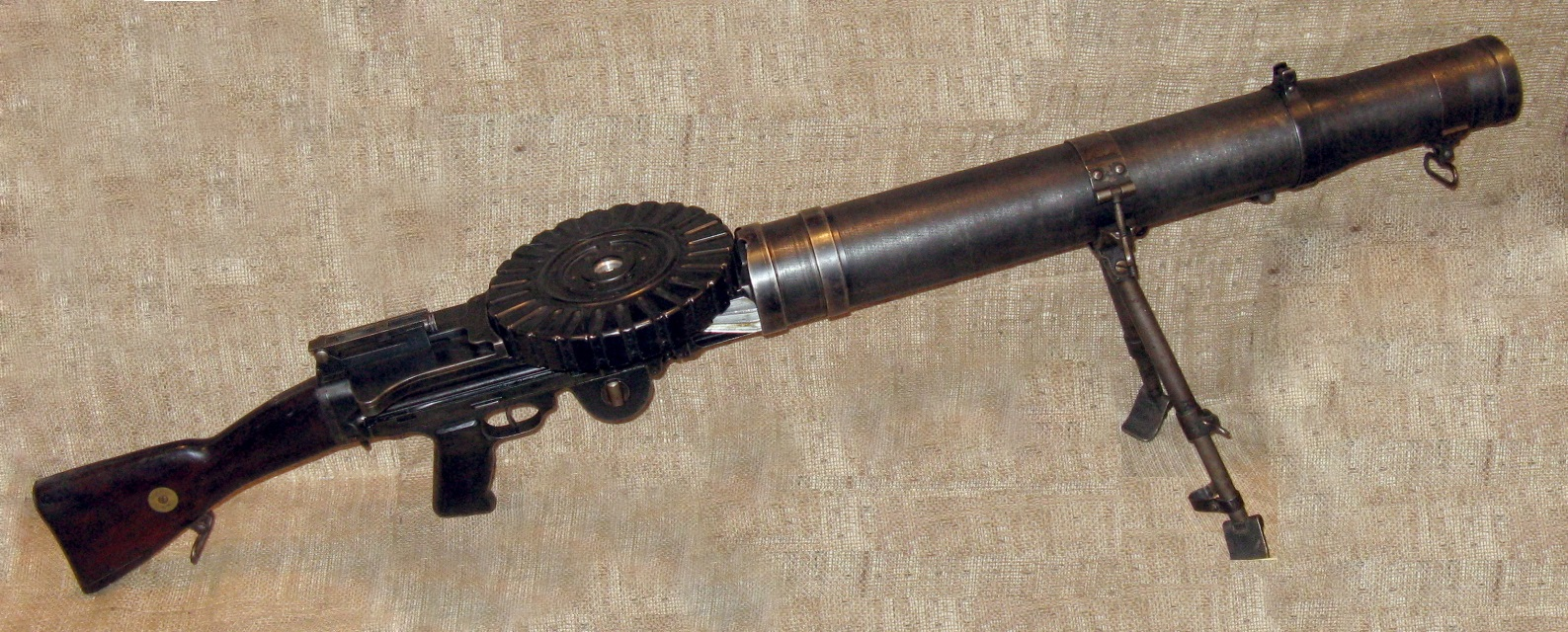
Lewis

The Lewis Gun was invented in 1911 by Isaac Newton Lewis and first mass-produced in Belgium in 1913 for the .303 British cartridge, and widely used by the British army in the First World War, both by infantry and fitted to aircraft. Pan magazines are secured above the breech, holding either 47 or 97 rounds. Cooling fins surround the barrel. The weapon is gas operated and fires automatically at 500-600 rounds per minute.

More than 50,000 Lewis guns were produced during WW1, becoming the most common automatic weapon used by British and American troops. Although superseded by the Bren gun by 1939, nearly 60,000 Lewis guns were refurbished and reissued to British forces after the Dunkirk evacuation of 1940.

=== Fedorov Avtomat ===
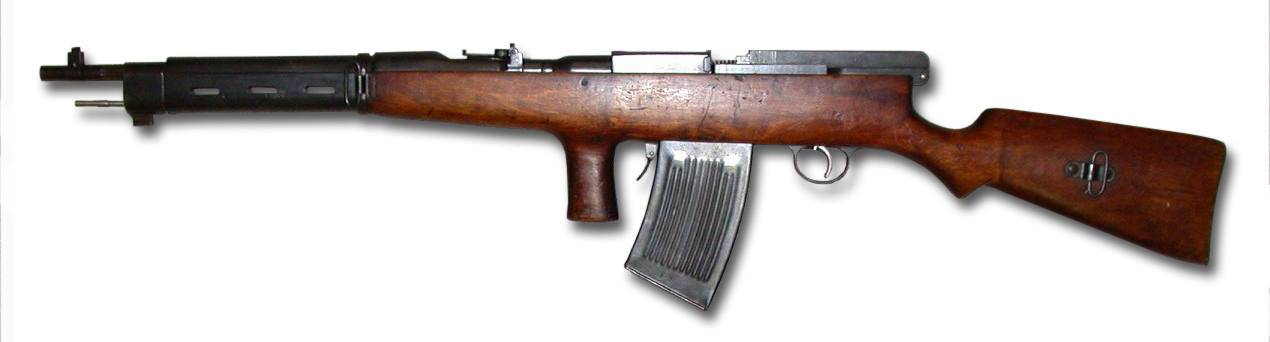
Fedorov Model 1916 Automatic Rifle

The Fedorov Avtomat (also anglicized as Federov, Russian: Автомат Фёдорова) or FA was a select-fire, crew-served automatic rifle and was one of the first practical automatic rifles, designed by Vladimir Grigoryevich Fyodorov in 1915 and produced in the Russian Empire and later in the Russian Soviet Federative Socialist Republic. A total of 3,200 Fedorov rifles were manufactured between 1915 and 1924 in the city of Kovrov; the vast majority of them were made after 1920. The weapon saw limited combat in World War I, but was used more substantially in the Russian Civil War and in the Winter War. In 1916, the Weapons Committee of the Russian Army made a decision to order no less than 25,000 Fedorov automatic rifles. In the summer of 1916, a company from the 189th Izmail Regiment was equipped with 8 Fedorov Avtomats. Trained in tactics with the new weapon, they concluded that the Fedorov worked best as a crew served weapon. The gunner armed with the Fedorov and an ammo bearer armed with an Arisaka rifle. As both weapons used the same ammo and same 5 round stripper clips, this allowed for the greatest flexibility. It also allowed for the ammo bearer to fire defensively, while the gunner reloaded. It was also recommended that the primary mode of fire be in semi-automatic, as the Fedorov's would rapidly overheat in full-auto. Some consider it to be an "early predecessor" or "ancestor" to the modern assault rifle, while others believe that the Fedorov Avtomat was the world's first assault rifle.

=== Browning Automatic Rifle ===
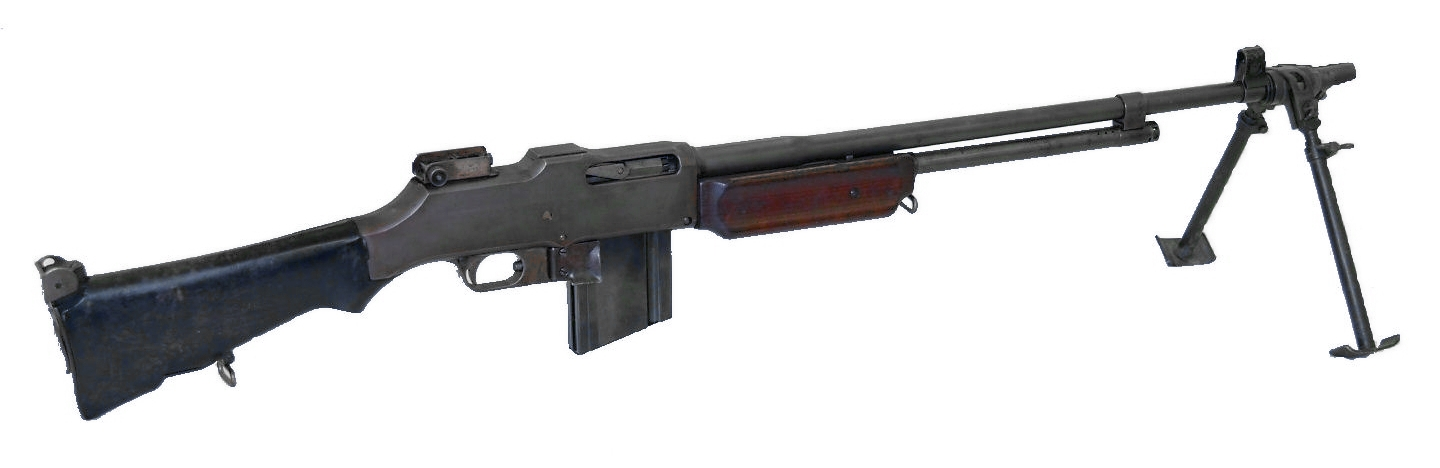
M1918A2 Browning Automatic Rifle

The Browning Automatic Rifle (BAR) was one of the first practical automatic rifles. The BAR made its successful combat debut in World War I, and approximately 50,000 were made before the war came to an end. The BAR arose from the concept of "walking fire", an idea urged upon the Americans by the French who used the Chauchat light machine gun to fulfill that role. The BAR never entirely lived up to the designer's hopes; being neither a rifle nor a machinegun. "For its day, though, it was a brilliant design produced in record time by John Browning, and it was bought and used by many countries around the world. It was the standard squad light automatic of the U.S. infantry during World War II and saw use in every theater of war." The BAR was praised for its reliability and stopping power. "The US forces abandoned the BAR in the middle 1950s, though it was retained in reserve stocks for several years; it survived in smaller countries until the late 1970s."

=== AVS-36 ===
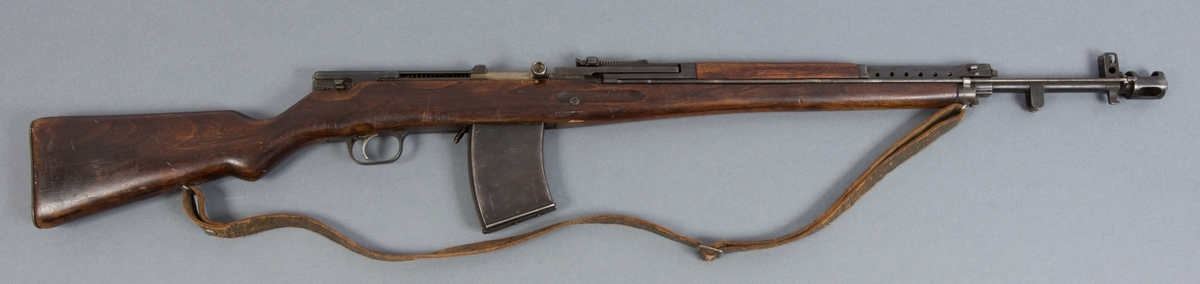
The Soviet AVS-36 battle rifle,

The AVS-36 (from Avtomaticheskaya Vintovka Simonova 1936 model; (АВС-36)) was a Soviet automatic rifle which saw service in the early years of World War II. It was among the early selective fire infantry rifles (capable of both single and full-automatic fire) formally adopted for military service. The designer, Sergei Simonov, began his work with a gas-operated self-loading rifle in 1930. The first prototype was ready in 1931 and appeared promising, and three years later a trial batch of an improved design was made. In 1935, a competition between Simonov's design and a rifle made by Fedor Tokarev was held. The Simonov rifle emerged as a winner and was accepted into service as the AVS-36. The AVS-36 was first seen in public in the 1938 May Day parade in Moscow, when it was displayed by the marching 1st Rifle Division. The American public became aware when it was covered in an August 1942 issue of the American Infantry Journal, in an article by John Garrett Underhill Jr. Simonov would later design an anti-tank rifle, the PTRS-41, and the SKS carbine, which employed simpler tilting bolt operation.

=== FG 42 ===
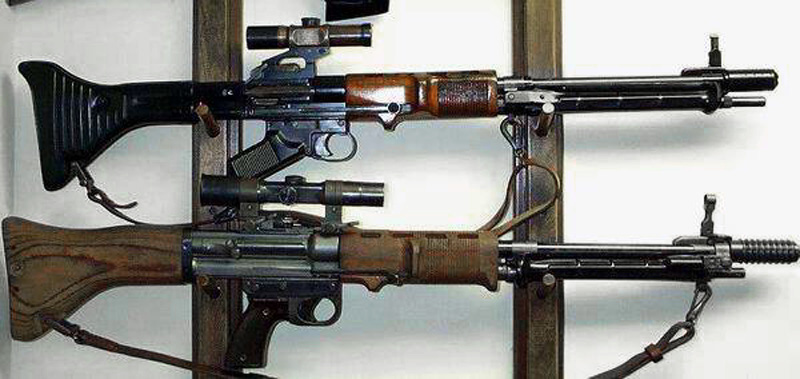
Both early (top) and late-war (bottom) variants of the FG 42.

The FG 42 is a selective fire automatic rifle or battle rifle produced in Germany during World War II. The weapon was developed specifically for the use of the Fallschirmjäger airborne infantry in 1942 and was used in limited numbers until the end of the war. It served as a squad automatic rifle in much the same role as the Browning BAR. It combined the firepower of a light machine gun in a lightweight package no larger than the standard-issue Kar 98k bolt-action rifle. It was considered one of the most advanced weapon designs of World War II. The FG 42 influenced post-war small arms development and most of its design was copied by the US Army when they developed the M60 machine gun.

=== Sturmgewehr 44 ===
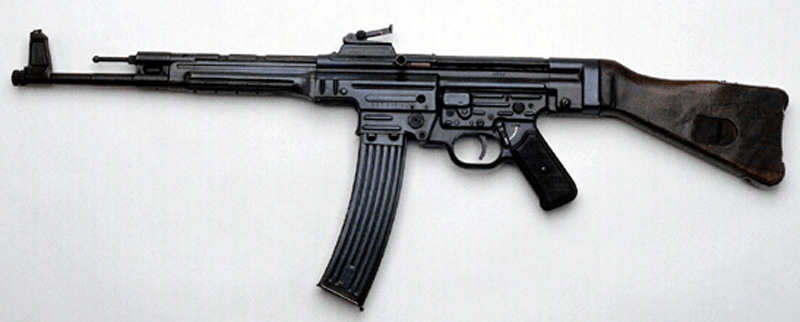
The German StG 44, the first assault rifle manufactured in significant numbers

The Germans were the first to pioneer the assault rifle concept, during World War II, based upon research that showed that most firefights happen within 400 meters and that contemporary rifles were over-powered for most small arms combat. The Germans sought to develop a select-fire intermediate powered rifle combining the firepower of a submachine gun with the accuracy and range of a rifle. This was done by shortening the standard 7.92×57mm cartridge to 7.92×33mm and giving it a lighter 125-grain bullet, that limited range but allowed for more controllable automatic fire. The result was the Sturmgewehr 44.

=== AK-47 ===
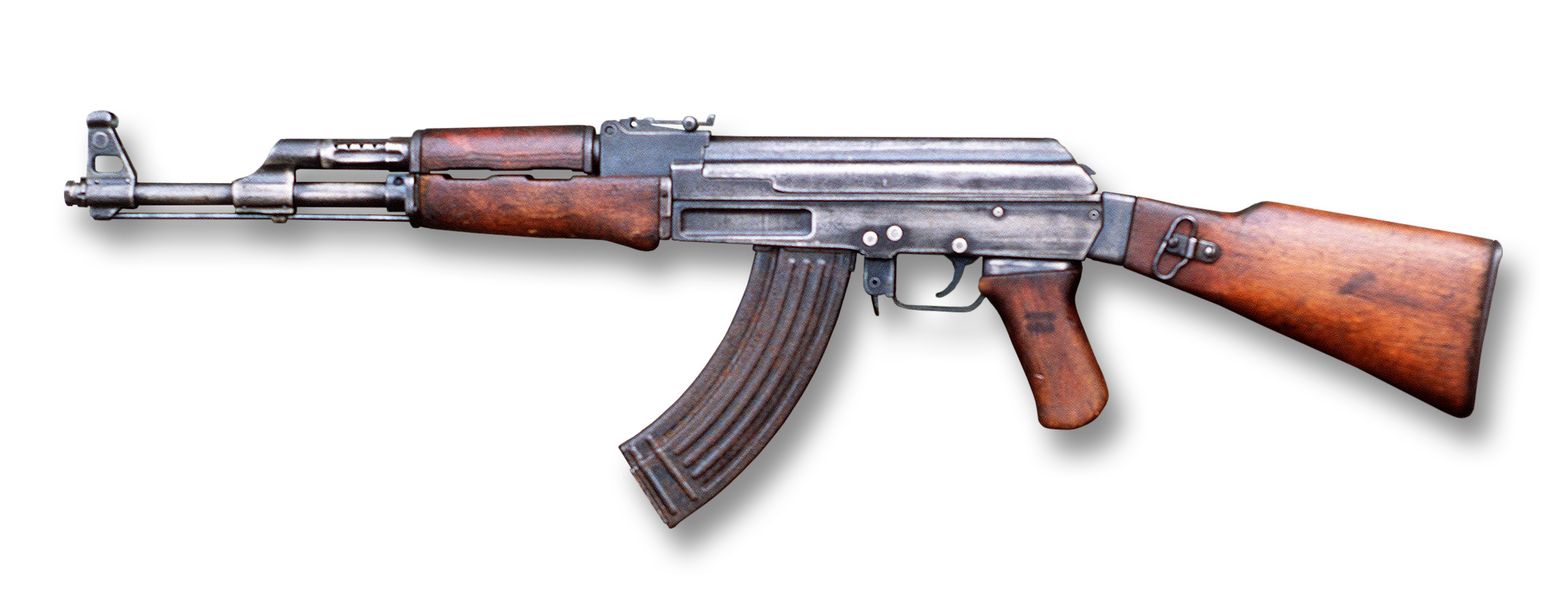
An AK-47 with a machined receiver

Like the Germans, the Soviets were influenced by experience showing most combat happens within 400 meters and that their soldiers were consistently outgunned by heavily armed German troops, especially those armed with the Sturmgewehr 44 assault rifles. The Soviets were so impressed with the Sturmgewehr 44, that after World War II, they held a design competition to develop an assault rifle of their own. The winner was the AK-47. It was finalized, adopted and entered widespread service in the Soviet army in the early 1950s. Its firepower, ease of use, low production costs, and reliability were perfectly suited for the Red Army's new mobile warfare doctrines. The AK-47 was widely supplied or sold to nations allied with the USSR and the blueprints were shared with several friendly nations (the People's Republic of China standing out among these with the Type 56 assault rifle). The AK-47 and AKM type rifles are the most produced firearms in history.

=== M14 rifle (battle rifle) ===
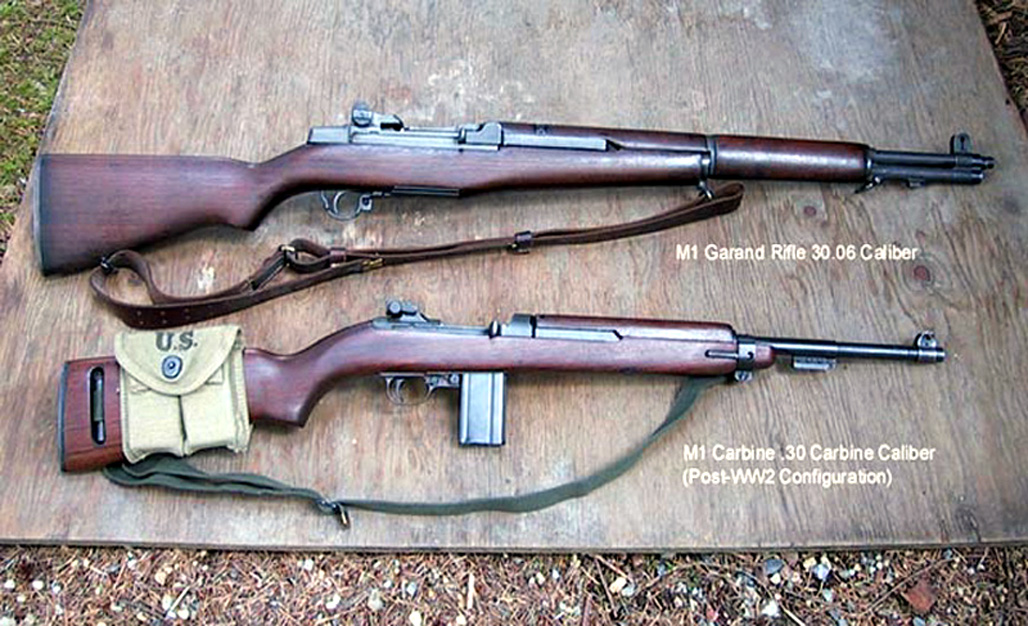
The M1 Rifle and M1 Carbine

The U.S. Army was influenced by combat experience with semi-automatic weapons such as the M1 Garand and M1 carbine, which enjoyed a significant advantage over enemies armed primarily with bolt-action rifles. Although U.S. Army studies of World War II combat accounts had very similar results to that of the Germans and Soviets, the U.S. Army maintained its traditional views and preference for high-powered semi-automatic rifles.

After World War II, the United States military started looking for a single automatic rifle to replace the M1 Garand, M1/M2 Carbines, M1918 Browning automatic rifle, M3 submachine gun and Thompson submachine gun. However, early experiments with select-fire versions of the M1 Garand proved disappointing. During the Korean War, the select-fire M2 Carbine largely replaced submachine guns in US service. However, combat experience suggested that the .30 Carbine round was underpowered. American weapons designers reached the same conclusion as the Germans and Soviets: an intermediate round was necessary, and recommended a small caliber, high velocity-cartridge.

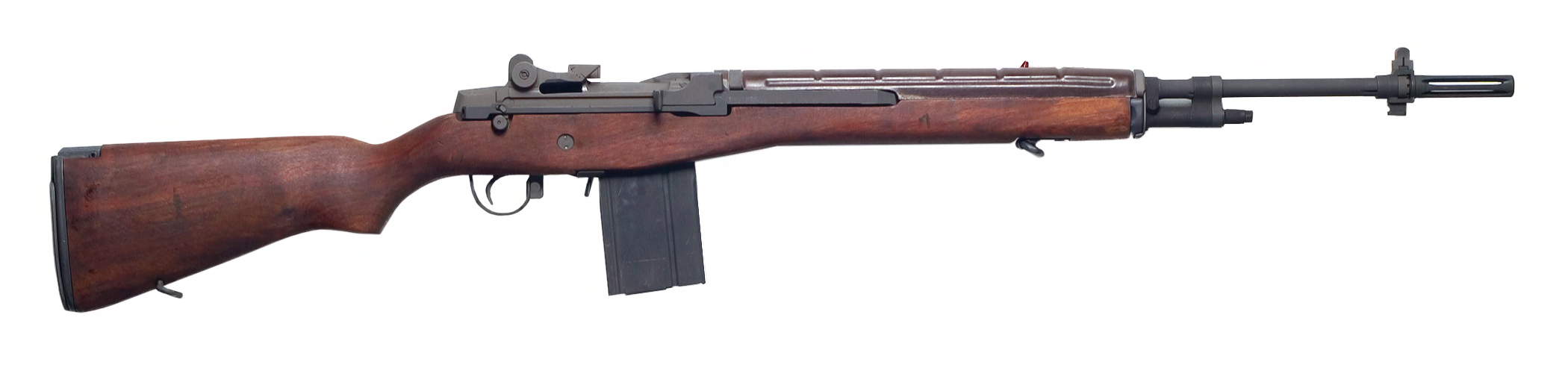
U.S. M14 rifle, advanced by the proponents of the battle rifle concept

However, senior American commanders, having faced fanatical enemies and experienced major logistical problems during World War II and the Korean War, insisted that a single powerful .30 caliber cartridge be developed, that could not only be used by the new automatic rifle, but by the new general purpose machine gun (GPMG) in concurrent development. This culminated in the development of the 7.62×51mm NATO cartridge and the M14 rifle which was basically an improved select-fire M1 Garand with a 20-round magazine. The U.S. also adopted the M60 GPMG. Its NATO partners adopted the FN FAL and HK G3 rifles, as well as the FN MAG and Rheinmetall MG3 GPMGs.

=== FN FAL ===
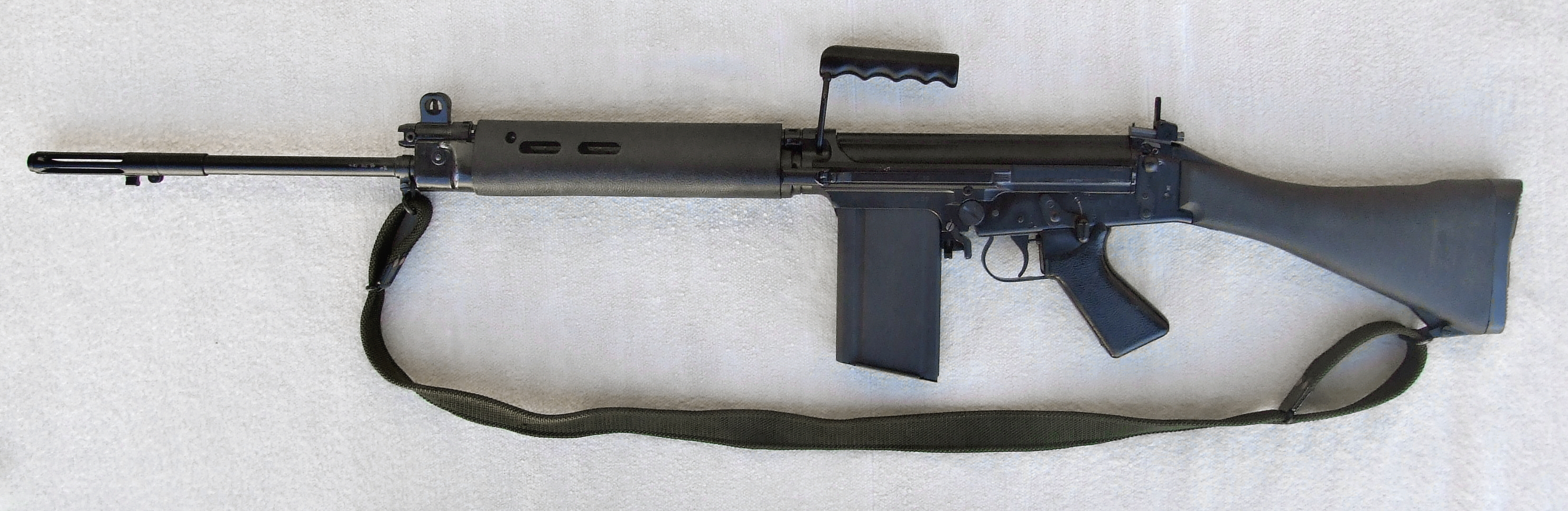
British L1A1 (FN FAL)

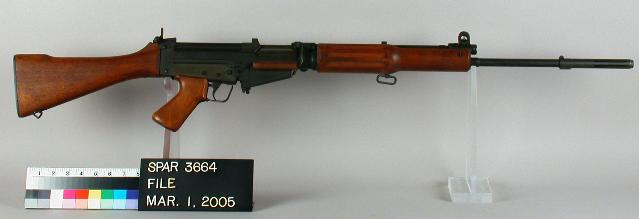
The T48, an American copy of the FN FAL

The FN FAL is a 7.62×51mm NATO, selective fire, automatic rifle produced by the Belgian armaments manufacturer Fabrique Nationale de Herstal (FN). During the Cold War, it was adopted by many North Atlantic Treaty Organization (NATO) countries, most notably with the British Commonwealth as the L1A1. It is one of the most widely used rifles in history, having been used by more than 90 countries. The FAL was predominantly chambered for the 7.62mm NATO round, and because of its prevalence and widespread use among the armed forces of many western nations during the Cold War it was nicknamed "The right arm of the Free World".

=== H&K G3 ===
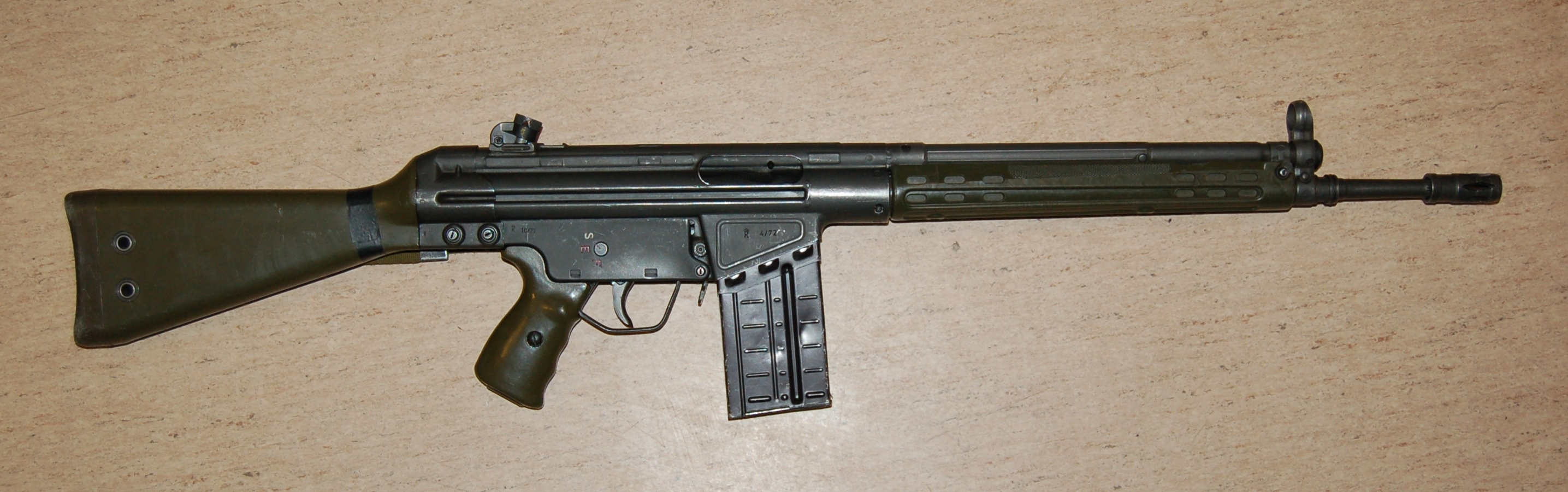
Norwegian AG-3 (HK G3)

The H&K G3 is a 7.62×51mm NATO, selective fire, automatic rifle produced by the German armament manufacturer Heckler & Koch GmbH (H&K) in collaboration with the Spanish state-owned design and development agency CETME (Centro de Estudios Técnicos de Materiales Especiales). The rifle proved successful in the export market, being adopted by the armed forces of over 60 countries. After World War II, German technicians involved in developing the Sturmgewehr 45, continued their research in France at CEAM. The StG45 mechanism was modified by Ludwig Vorgrimler and Theodor Löffler at the Mulhouse facility between 1946 and 1949. Vorgrimler later went to work at CETME in Spain and developed the line of CETME automatic rifles based on his improved Stg45 design. Germany eventually purchased the license for the CETME design and manufactured the Heckler & Koch G3 as well as an entire line of weapons built on the same system, one of the most famous being the MP5 SMG.

=== M16 rifle ===
The first confrontations between the AK-47 and the M14 (assault rifle vs battle rifle) came in the early part of the Vietnam War. Battlefield reports indicated that the M14 was uncontrollable in automatic mode and that soldiers could not carry enough ammo to maintain fire superiority over the AK-47. A replacement was needed: A medium between the traditional preference for high-powered rifles such as the M14, and the lightweight firepower of the M2 Carbine.

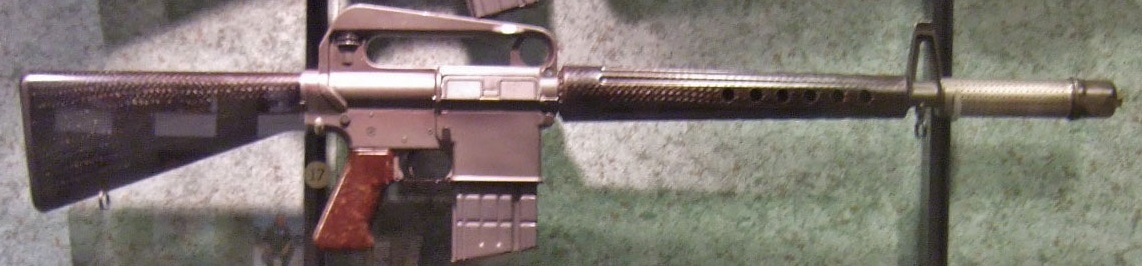
AR-10 rifle

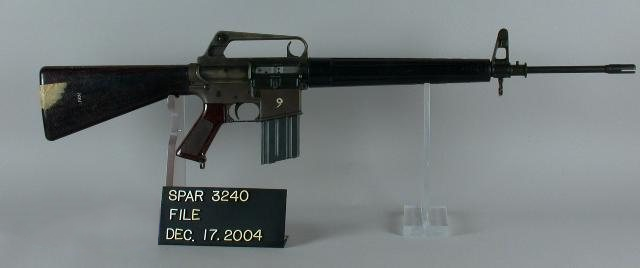
ArmaLite AR-15

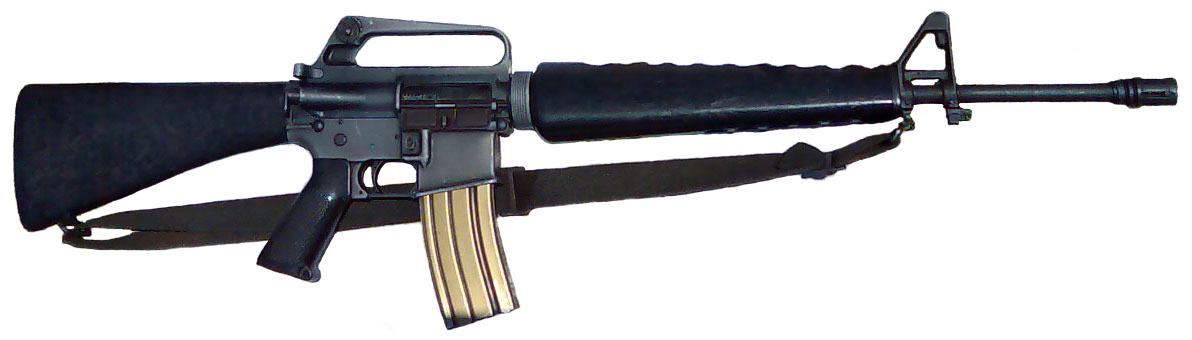
American 5.56×45mm M16A1

As a result, the Army was forced to reconsider a 1957 request by General Willard G. Wyman, commander of the U.S. Continental Army Command (CONARC) to develop a .223 caliber (5.56 mm) select-fire rifle weighing 6 lbs (2.7 kg) when loaded with a 20-round magazine. The 5.56mm round had to penetrate a standard U.S. helmet at 500 yards (460 meters) and retain a velocity in excess of the speed of sound while matching or exceeding the wounding ability of the .30 Carbine cartridge.

This request ultimately resulted in the development of a scaled-down version of the ArmaLite AR-10, called ArmaLite AR-15 rifle. However, despite overwhelming evidence that the AR-15 could bring more firepower to bear than the M14, the Army opposed the adoption of the new rifle. In January 1963, Secretary of Defense Robert McNamara concluded that the AR-15 was the superior weapon system and ordered a halt to M14 production. At the time, the AR-15 was the only rifle available that could fulfill the requirement of a universal infantry weapon for issue to all services. After modifications (Most notably: the charging handle was re-located from under the carrying handle like AR-10 to the rear of the receiver), the new redesigned rifle was subsequently adopted as the M16.

The M16 entered U.S. service in the mid-1960s and was much lighter than the M14 it replaced, allowing soldiers to carry more ammunition. Despite its early failures, the M16 proved to be a revolutionary design and stands as the longest continuously serving rifle in American military history. It is a benchmark against which other assault rifles are judged, and used by 15 NATO countries, and more than 80 countries worldwide

=== HK33 ===
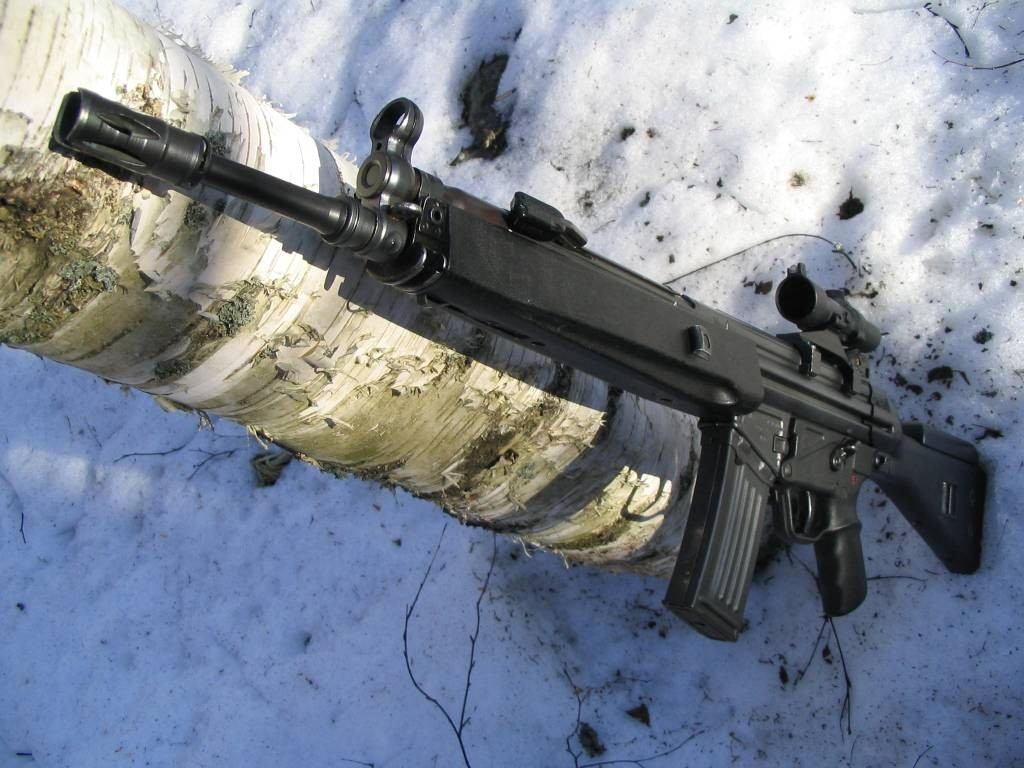
Heckler & Koch HK33A2 with Trijicon Compact ACOG

During the 1960s, other countries would follow the Americans lead and begin to develop 5.56×45mm assault rifles, most notably Germany with the Heckler & Koch HK33. The HK33 was essentially a smaller 5.56mm version of the 7.62×51mm Heckler & Koch G3 rifle. As one of the first 5.56mm assault rifles on the market, it would go on to become one of the most widely distributed assault rifles. The HK33 featured a modular design with a wide range of accessories (telescoping butt-stocks, optics, bipods, etc.) that could be easily removed and arranged in a various configurations.

=== 5.56mm NATO ===
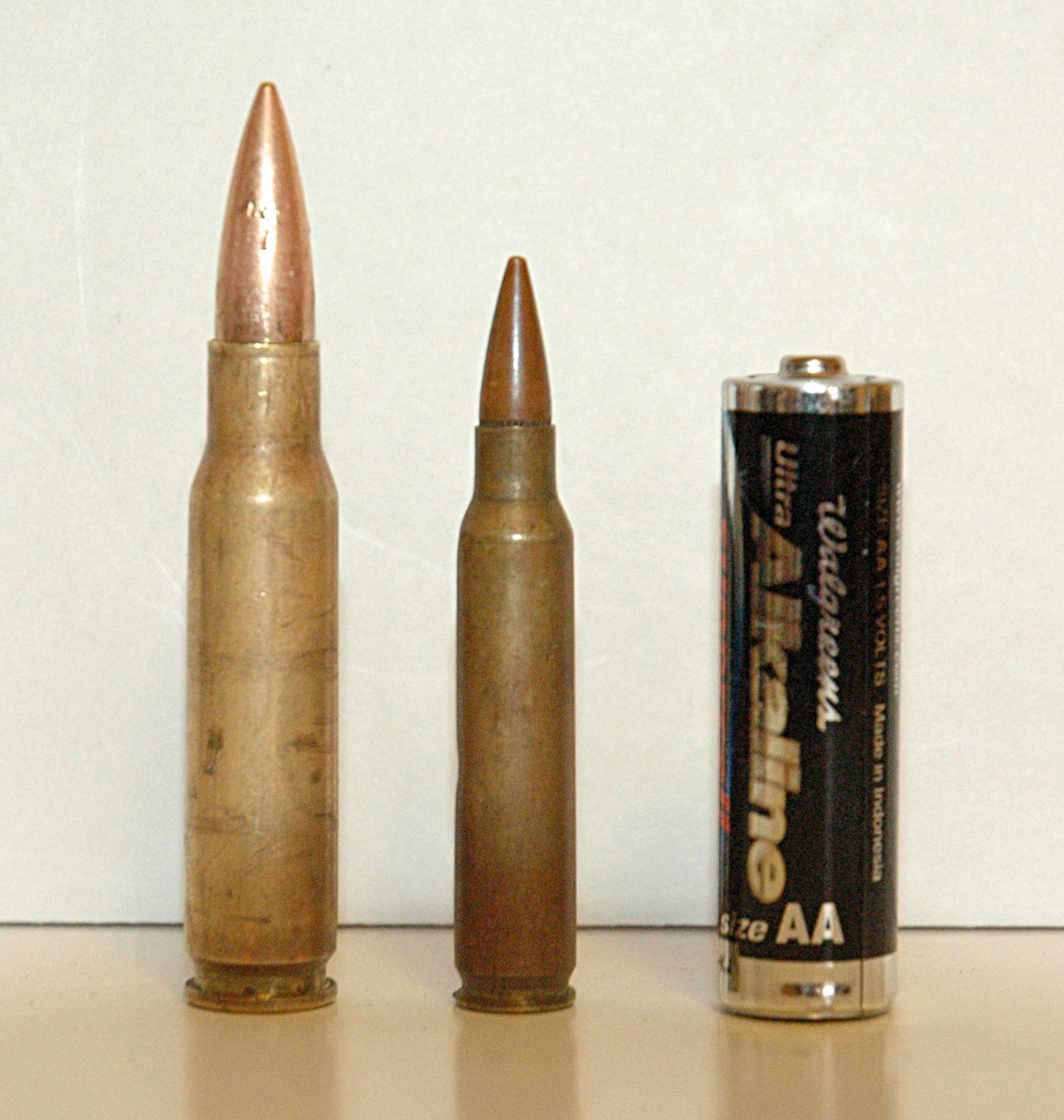
The 7.62×51mm NATO and 5.56×45mm NATO cartridges compared to an AA battery.

The adoption of the M16, the H&K33, and the 5.56×45mm cartridge inspired an international trend towards relatively small-sized, lightweight, high-velocity military service cartridges that allow a soldier to carry more ammunition for the same weight compared to the larger and heavier 7.62×51mm NATO cartridge. The 5.56mm cartridge is also much easier to shoot. In 1961 marksmanship testing, the U.S. Army found that 43% of ArmaLite AR-15 shooters achieved Expert, while only 22% of M-14 rifle shooters did so. Also, a lower recoil impulse allows for more controllable automatic weapons fire.

Therefore, in March 1970, the U.S. recommended that all NATO forces adopt the 5.56×45mm cartridge. This shift represented a change in the philosophy of the military's long-held position about caliber size. By the middle of the 1970s, other armies were looking at assault rifle type weapons. A NATO standardization effort soon started and tests of various rounds were carried out starting in 1977. The U.S. offered the 5.56×45mm M193 round, but there were concerns about its penetration in the face of the wider introduction of body armor. In the end, the Belgian 5.56×45mm SS109 round was chosen (STANAG 4172) in October 1980. The SS109 round was based on the U.S. cartridge but included a new stronger, heavier, 62 grain bullet design, with better long range performance and improved penetration (specifically, to consistently penetrate the side of a steel helmet at 600 meters).

During the 1970s, the USSR developed the AK-74 and the 5.45×39mm cartridge, which has similar physical characteristics to the U.S. 5.56×45mm cartridge. Also during the 1970s, Finland, Israel, South Africa and Sweden introduced AK type rifles in 5.56×45mm. During the 1990s, the Russians developed the AK-101 in 5.56×45mm NATO for the world export market. In addition, Bulgaria, Czechoslovakia, Hungary, Poland and former countries of Yugoslavia have also rechambered their locally produced assault rifle variants to 5.56mm NATO. The adoption the 5.56mm NATO and 5.45×39mm cemented the worldwide trend toward small caliber, high-velocity cartridges.

=== Steyr AUG (bullpup rifle) ===
In 1977, Austria introduced the 5.56×45mm Steyr AUG bullpup rifle, often cited as the first successful bullpup rifle, finding service with the armed forces of over twenty countries. It was highly advanced for the 1970s, combining in the same weapon the bullpup configuration, a polymer housing, dual vertical grips, an optical sight as standard, and a modular design. Highly reliable, light, and accurate, the Steyr AUG showed clearly the potential of the bullpup layout. In 1978, France introduced the 5.56×45mm FAMAS bullpup rifle. In 1985, the British introduced the 5.56×45mm L85 bullpup rifle. In the late 1990s, Israel introduced the Tavor TAR-21 and China's People's Liberation Army's adopted QBZ-95. By the turn of the century, the bullpup design had achieved world-wide acceptance.

== See also ==
Other weapons:

- Madsen machine gun – (Denmark)
- Chauchat – (French Third Republic, France)
- Burton Machine Rifle – (United States)
- Fedorov Avtomat – (Russian Empire, Russian Socialist Federative Soviet Republic, Soviet Union)
- Farquhar-Hill rifle – (United Kingdom)
- Leichtes Maschinengewehr Modell 1925 "Lmg 25" – (Switzerland)
- Huot Automatic Rifle – (Canada)
- Mors submachine gun – (Second Polish Republic, Poland)
- Knötgen automatic rifle – (German Empire)
- Sieg automatic rifle – (United States)
- Colt Automatic Rifle – (United States)
- M27 infantry automatic rifle – (Germany)
- M+G project – (Netherlands)
- Howell automatic rifle – (United Kingdom)
- Rieder automatic rifle – (South Africa)
- SIG SG 510 – (Switzerland)

Other related articles:

- Semi-automatic rifle
- Assault rifle
- Battle rifle
- Marksman rifle
- Sniper rifle
- Light machine gun
- Squad automatic weapon
- List of firearms
