= Fedorov Avtomat =

Soviet battle rifle

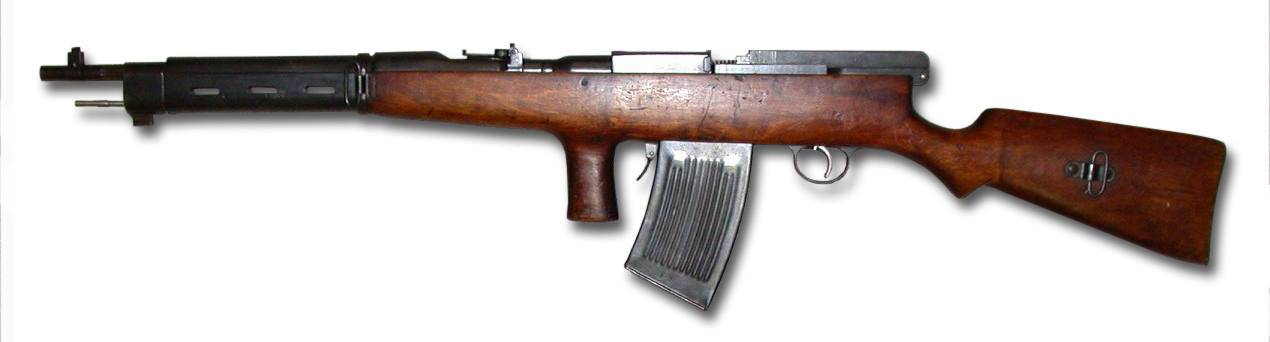
- Type: Battle rifle Automatic rifle
- Place of origin: Russian Empire

Service history
- In service: 1915–1940
- Used by: Russian Empire; Russian Soviet Federative Socialist Republic; Soviet Union; Finland
- Wars: World War I Russian Revolution; Russian Civil War; East Karelian uprising Winter War; World War II

Production history
- Designer: Vladimir Grigoryevich Fyodorov
- Designed: 1913
- Manufacturer: Kovrov Arms Factory, (Now V. A. Degtyarev Plant, OJSC)
- Produced: 1913–1925
- No. built: 3,200 (1920s production), plus a limited number produced during World War I

Specifications
- Mass: 4.4 kg (9.7 lb) (5.2 kg (11 lb) loaded)
- Length: 1,045 mm (41.1 in)
- Barrel length: 520 mm (20 in)
- Cartridge: 6.5×50mmSR Arisaka
- Action: Short recoil operation
- Rate of fire: 600 Rounds/min
- Muzzle velocity: 660 metres per second (2,200 ft/s)
- Feed system: 25-round detachable box magazine
- Sights: Iron sights

The Fedorov Avtomat (also anglicized as Federov, Russian: Автома́т Фёдорова, romanized: Avtomát Fyódorova, IPA: [ɐftɐˈmat ˈfʲɵdərəvə], lit. 'Fyodorov's automatic rifle') or FA is a select-fire infantry rifle and one of the world's first operational automatic rifles, designed by Vladimir Grigoryevich Fyodorov in 1915 and produced in the Russian Empire and later in the Russian Soviet Federative Socialist Republic. A limited number of Fedorov rifles were produced during World War I, but the majority, approximately 3,200, were manufactured at the Kovrov Arsenal in the early 1920s. The weapon saw limited combat in World War I, but was used more substantially in the Russian Civil War and in the Winter War. Some consider it to be an early predecessor or ancestor of the modern assault rifle.

== Design and development ==
Fedorov mechanism schematic

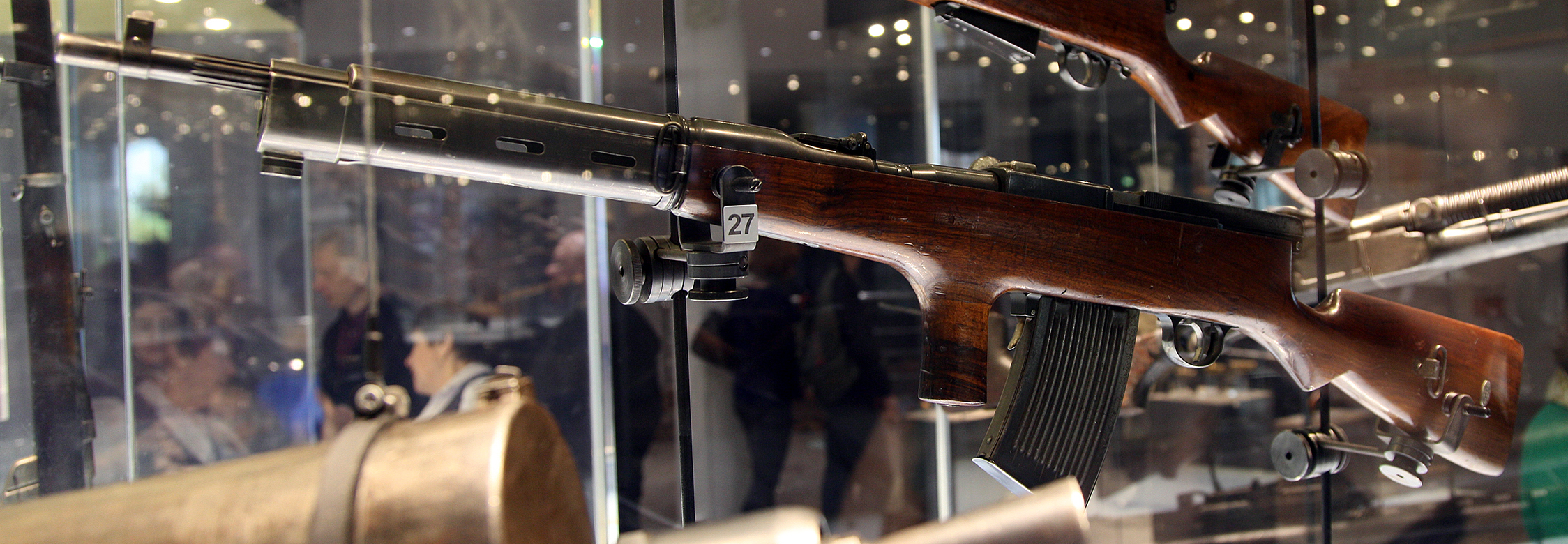
A Fedorov Avtomat rifle at the Tula State Museum of Weapons

The Fedorov Avtomat is a short-recoil operated, locked-breech weapon which fires from a closed bolt. The bolt locking is achieved by a pair of symmetrical plates mounted to either side of the breech and held in place by a sheet metal cover, each with two lugs, one square and one round, mounted at either side of the breech, latching barrel and bolt together through recesses on the bolt. Those plates are allowed to tilt slightly down after about 10 mm of free recoil, unlocking the bolt. A bolt hold-open device is fitted and the firing mechanism is of hammer type.

Captain V. Fedorov began a prototype of a semi-automatic rifle in 1906, working with future small arms designer Vasily Degtyaryov as his assistant. A model was submitted to the Rifle Commission of the Russian army in 1911, which ordered 150 more rifles for testing. In 1913, Fedorov submitted a prototype automatic rifle with a stripper clip-fed fixed magazine, chambered for his own experimental rimless 6.5 mm cartridge, 6.5mm Fedorov. This new rimless ammunition was more compact than the rimmed Russian 7.62×54mmR, better suited for automatic weapons and produced less recoil but occasionally caused jamming. When fired from an 800 mm barrel, 6.5mm Federov propelled an 8.5 gram pointed jacketed bullet to an initial velocity of 860 m/s with a muzzle energy of 3,140 J versus the 3,550 J muzzle energy of 7.62×54mmR ammunition from a barrel of the same length. 6.5 mm Fedorov rifles were tested late in 1913 with somewhat favorable results.

In the autumn of 1915, Fedorov was posted as a military observer to France, in the Mont-Saint-Éloi sector. Impressed by the ubiquity and firepower of the French Chauchat, he nonetheless criticized its immobility. According to Fedorov's memoirs, it is here he came up with the idea of introducing into Russian service a weapon with firepower intermediate between the rifle and the light machine gun, but with mobility comparable to a rifle. His decision to adapt his semi-automatic rifle design for this purpose was one of wartime expediency. Fedorov set to the task upon his return to Russia in January 1916. He retained the mechanism of his semi-automatic rifle, with the major addition of a selective fire switch. The fixed magazine was replaced by a curved 25-round detachable box magazines. Due to limited trial nature of its production, most of its parts were custom fitted and not interchangeable, including the magazine. Therefore, in practice, each Fedorov Avtomat was issued to the troops with only three magazines, which would be reloaded through the breech via standard 5-round Arisaka stripper clips.

Production of the new cartridge was out of question so it was decided to convert 6.5 mm Fedorov rifles to use the Japanese 6.5×50mmSR Arisaka ammunition which was in abundance, having been purchased from Japan and the United Kingdom along with Arisaka rifles. (About 763,000 Arisaka-type rifles were imported to Russia, along with approximately 400 million cartridges for them; domestic production of the Arisaka cartridge remained insignificant though.) The change of ammunition involved only minimal changes to the rifle, including a chamber insert and a new range scale for the rear sights. The noticeably less powerful Japanese cartridge meant that the muzzle velocity was only about 660 m/s because of constrained barrel length.

A US Army analysis from the early 1950s considered that the Fedorov Avtomat was unreasonably complex to manufacture and that it suffered from rapid overheating of the barrel on automatic fire. Russian tests indicated that the gun could fire about 300 rounds continuously before heat buildup rendered it inoperable. This was still an improvement compared to the Mosin–Nagant M1891 rifles, which would begin to smolder after 100 rounds. The main factor in the increased heat dissipation was the metal shroud over the barrel at the end of the forearm, which acted as a radiator. In terms of accuracy, Russian data indicates that when fired in short bursts the Fedorov Avtomat could reliably hit targets having a profile of 0.6×0.5 m at a distance of 200 m. At 400 m the dispersion increased to 1.1×0.9 m, and at 800 m it was 2.1×1.85 m. Consequently, burst fire was only considered effective up to about 500 m.

== Production and service ==
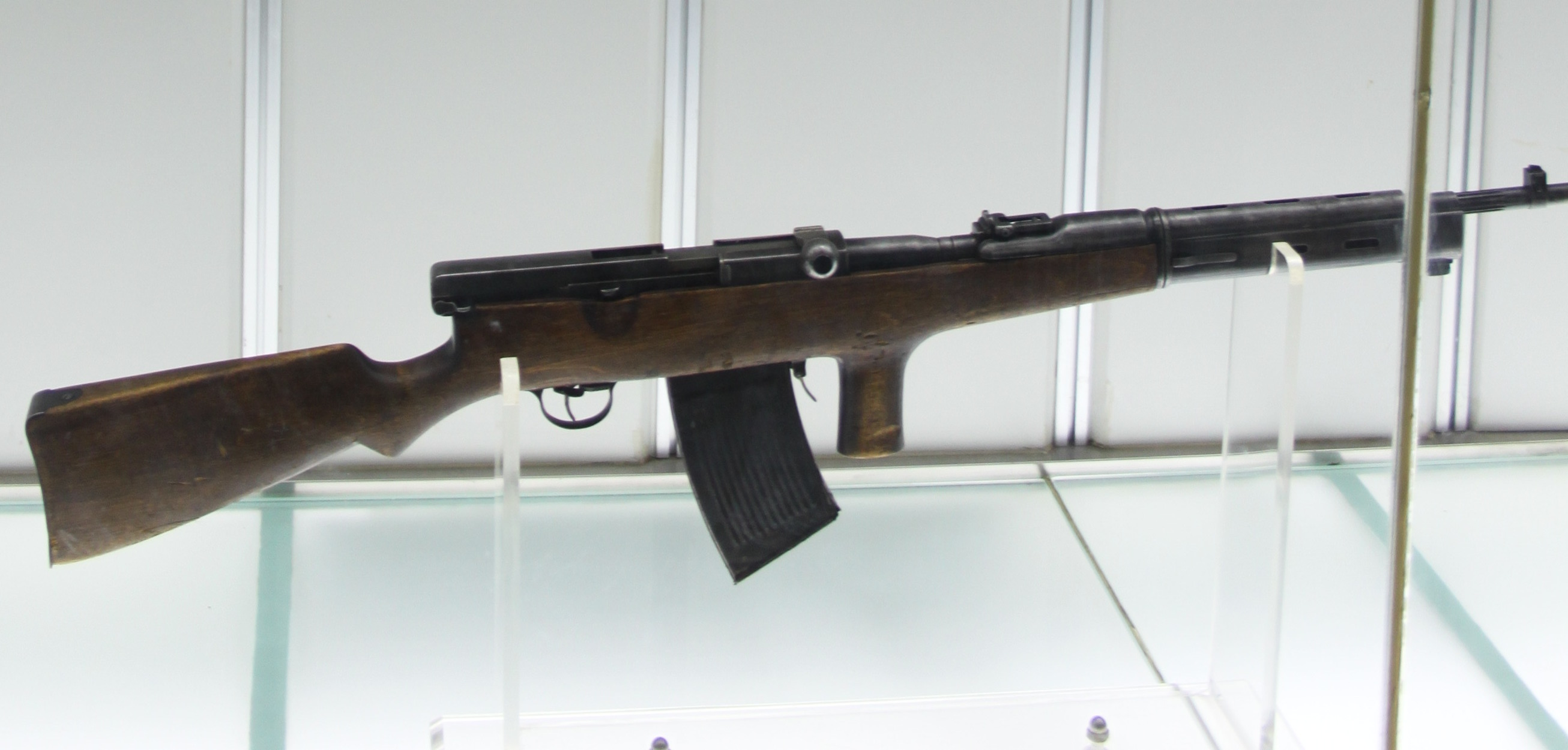
A Fedorov Avtomat in the Military Museum of the Chinese People's Revolution

In 1916, the Weapons Committee of the Russian Army decided to order no less than 25,000 Fedorov automatic rifles. In the summer of 1916, a company from the 189th Izmail Regiment was equipped with eight Fedorov Avtomats. Trained in tactics with the new weapon, they concluded that the Fedorov worked best as a crew-served weapon: the gunner armed with the Fedorov, and an ammo bearer armed with an Arisaka rifle. As both weapons used the same ammo and same 5-round stripper clips, this allowed for the greatest flexibility. It also allowed for the ammo bearer to fire defensively, while the gunner reloaded. It was also recommended that the primary mode of fire be in semi-automatic, as the Fedorov would rapidly overheat in full-automatic. After completing their training, the company was deployed to the Romanian front in early 1917. It was supposed to report back valuable combat experience with the new weapon, but this did not happen because the company disintegrated during the Kerensky offensive. About 10 other Avtomats were given to the Russian naval aviation; Grand Duke Alexander Mikhailovich of Russia telegraphed back that his pilots found it more suitable than the Chauchat in light aircraft.

In early 1917, the order for Fedorov rifles was limited to 5,000 weapons. However, only about 100 Fedorov Avtomats had been produced before the collapse of the Russian Empire in 1917, when production was halted. The gun's cost estimated in 1918 was 1,090 rubles; in comparison the cost of a Madsen light machine gun was around 1,730 rubles at that time.

In 1920, Lev Kamenev found the Fedorov Avtomat to be a promising design and authorized a limited production run. The Avtomat was used to equip Red Army units in the Karelian sector during the Karelian Uprising, particularly the ski battalion of Toivo Antikainen. Reports from combat experiences with the gun during 1921–1922 were very positive as long as spare parts were available. In 1923, 10,000 copies of a 46-page manual for the gun were printed.

Despite some noted reliability issues and performance issues, the Fedorov Avtomat was deemed acceptable for Red Army use in a 1924 review. However, due to supply problems, Soviet leaders decided to abandon all weapons using foreign ammunition. As a consequence, production of the Fedorov Avtomat was halted in October 1925. Only 3,200 Fedorovs were manufactured between 1915 and 1925.

At the time of its use, the Fedorov Avtomat was one of only three practical fully automatic rifles in service, the other two being the American M1918 Browning Automatic Rifle and the French Chauchat. Although these alternative rifles were initially intended for mobile assault fire, both models became more or less exclusively used as stationary light machine guns due to their higher weight and caliber. However, the lighter, lower recoil Fedorov Avtomat, which was less than half the weight of the BAR and CSRG, retained a unique niche role as a mobile assault rifle. Despite this pioneering status, the Fedorov Avtomat was not without its flaws, and was notoriously difficult to clean, maintain, and repair.

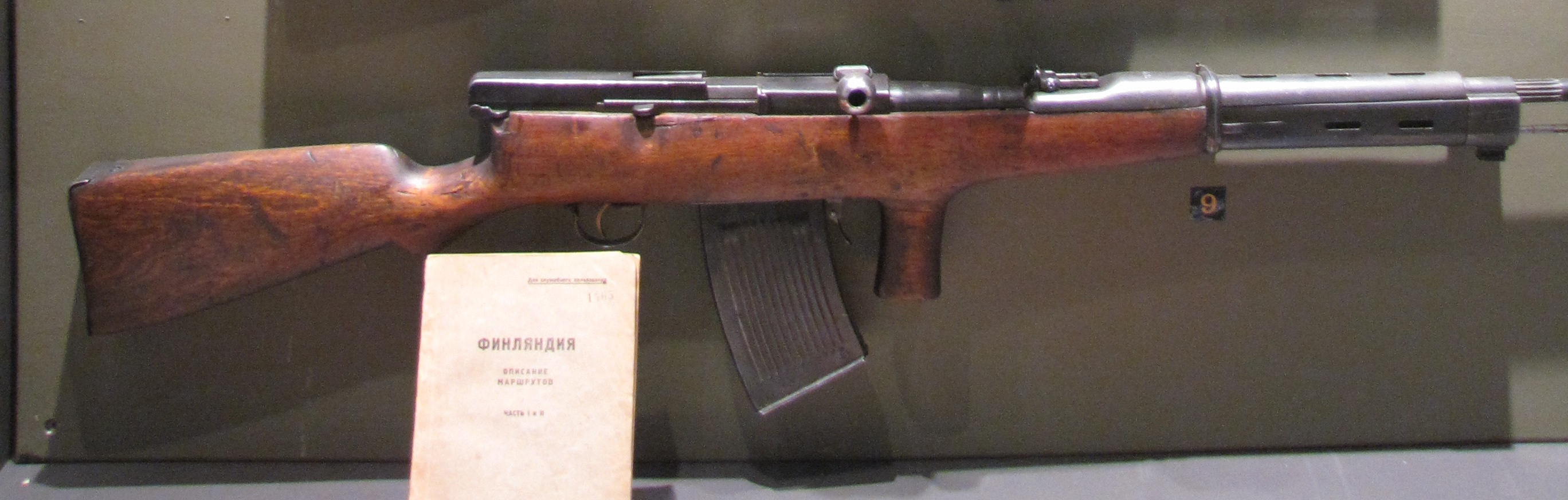
A Fedorov Avtomat captured by the Finnish during the Winter War

After 1925, the rifle was withdrawn from service and put in storage; the last unit to give it up was the Moscow Proletariat Red Banner Rifle Division in 1928. During the 1939–1940 Soviet–Finnish war, an acute lack of individual automatic weapons led to the reintroduction of the stockpiled Fedorovs into service. They were sent to the Karelian front, mostly to military intelligence units. According to Small Arms Review the largest acquisition of surviving Fedorov Avtomats are held by Finland. It is presumed that most of the Fedorov Avtomats were expended or destroyed during that war.

== Terminology ==
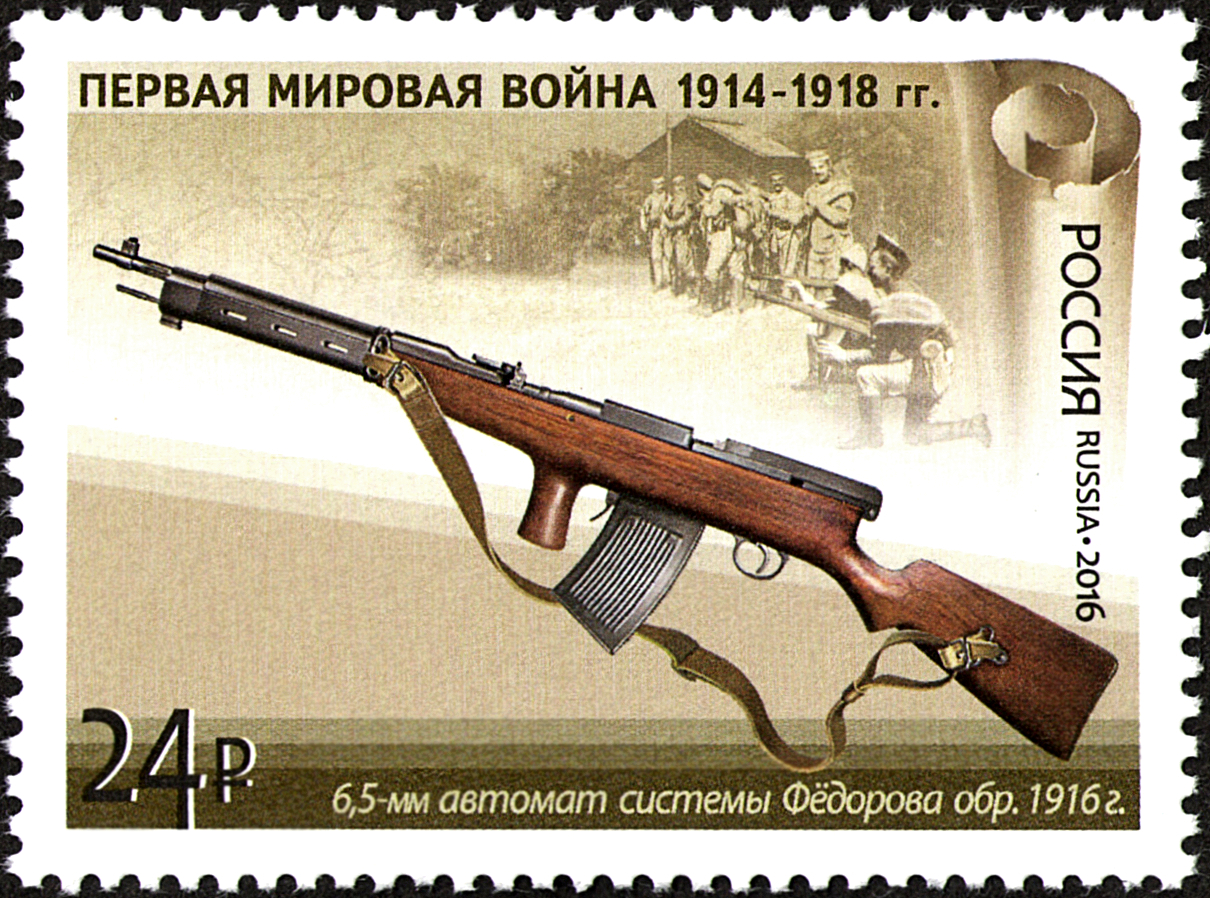
Russian stamp commemorating World War I, featuring the Fedorov Avtomat

Fedorov's superior, General Nikolai Filatov is credited for introducing the much shorter term "avtomat" for the gun — a neologism derived from the Greek word 'automaton' and synonymous with the English word "automatic", this is the one that stuck. Written records of this new term being applied to the gun date to 1919.

- Initially Fedorov wanted to call the class of weapons to which his new gun belonged ручное ружьё-пулемет (i.e. a class lighter than ружьё-пулемет for light machine guns like the Madsen or Lewis, although it literally translated as "handheld light-machine-gun"), which reflected his tactical thinking behind the development of the weapon. This designation appeared in a September 1916 article in the journal of the Artillery Commission.

In contemporary Russian terminology, the word "avtomat" (meaning "automate" as a noun rather than "automatic" as an adjective) typically denotes the equivalent of the English-language terminology "assault rifle", such as the Avtomat Kalashnikova for example. This differs from the terminology typically used when referring to automatic full-power cartridge rifles, such as the AVS-36 and AVT-40, which instead use the separate term "avtomaticheskaya".

Contemporary Occidental writers have struggled to classify the Fedorov Avtomat. Some consider it to be an "early predecessor" or "ancestor" to the modern assault rifle, while others believe that the Fedorov Avtomat was the world's first assault rifle. Some say it is "conforming to the specification of an assault rifle", stating 6.5mm Arisaka goes to the same category as 6.8x43 Remington SPC "in terms of calibre and muzzle energy", while being a service weapon in WWI. If a 9 gram bullet was fired with 654 m/s it would generate 1924.722 joules of muzzle-energy. Intermediate cartridges usually have between 1250 and 2500 joules of kinetic energy.

=== Even earlier proto-assault rifles ===
Still other writers argue that the Cei-Rigotti (which predates the works of Fedorov by 20 years) was the world's first assault rifle. Cei-Rigotti was also a select-fire auto-gun, chambered for 6.5×52mm Carcano, a similar round of intermediate kinetic power; however, its magazine was fed by stripper clips rather than being detachable, although prototypes with magazines up to a capacity of 50 rounds reportedly existed.

== See also ==
- Furrer M25
- Huot Automatic Rifle
- List of battle rifles
- List of Russian inventions
- M1941 Johnson machine gun
- Mondragón rifle
- Ribeyrolles 1918 automatic carbine
- Sturmgewehr 44
- Tokarev Model 1927
