= Cei-Rigotti =

Italian selective-fire automatic rifle

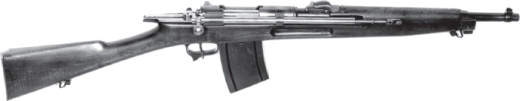
- Type: Selective-fire automatic rifle
- Place of origin: Kingdom of Italy

Production history
- Designer: Amerigo Cei-Rigotti
- Designed: c. 1890

Specifications
- Mass: 4.3 kg (9.5 lb)
- Length: 1,000 mm (39 in)
- Barrel length: 482.6 mm (19.00 in)
- Cartridge: 6.5×52mm Carcano; 7.65×53mm Mauser
- Action: Gas-operated, self-loading
- Rate of fire: 300–600 rpm
- Muzzle velocity: 730 m/s (2,400 ft/s)
- Maximum firing range: 1,400 m (1,500 yd)
- Feed system: 6-, 10-, 20-, 25-, 30-round fixed box magazine
- Sights: Iron sight

The Cei-Rigotti (also known as the Cei gas rifle) was an early automatic rifle designed in the late 19th century by Amerigo Cei-Rigotti, an officer of the Royal Italian Army. The rifle was tested by the Italian Army but was not adopted for standard military service.

The rifle was a gas-operated, selective-fire weapon capable of both semi-automatic and fully automatic fire. Several versions were developed during its experimental history, with variations in chambering and magazine configuration. The Cei-Rigotti was among the early attempts to develop an infantry rifle capable of automatic fire, but technical and practical limitations prevented it from entering standard military service.

== Background ==
The Italians developed self-loading rifles as early as 1893, and one of the earliest self-loading designs to show some practical value was the Cei-Rigotti rifle, created by Captain Amerigo Cei Rigotti of the Bersaglieri.

According to Morin, Cei Rigotti filled at least four different patents:

- Patent no. 38,428 dated 21 March 1895.
- Patent no. 51,806 dated 19 May 1899.
- Patent no. 67,116 dated 15 March 1903.
- Patent no. 119,210 dated 19 July 1911.

Commonly known in the Italian press as the Cei gas rifle, it attracted widespread attention in international military circles for a time, while the Italian arms company Glisenti-Bettoni managed to secure the rights to produce the rifle and attempted to sell it in Italy and abroad.

== Description ==
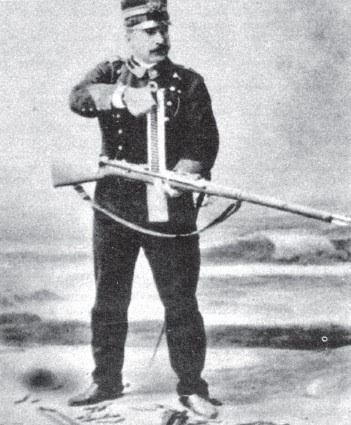
This circa 1900 photo shows an Italian soldier demonstrating charging and firing a standard and high capacity version of the Cei-Rigotti rifle. The charging clip holds about 25 rounds.

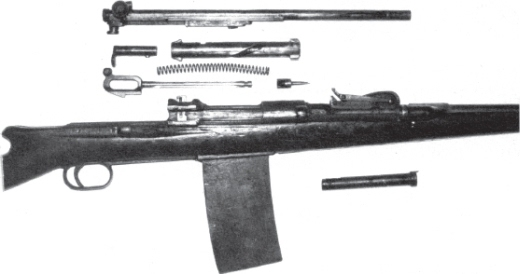
The Cei-Rigotti rifle field stripped.

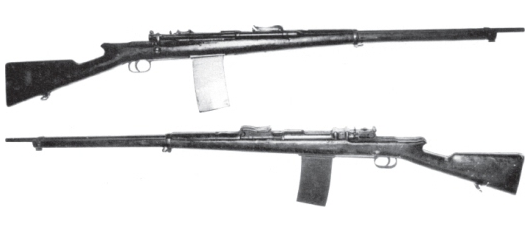
A version of the Cei-Rigotti rifle in 1900.

The rifle is gas operated and has selective fire capabilities (single shots or fully automatic). According to several publications, the prototype rifle was chambered for the 6.5×52mm Mannlicher–Carcano.

According to the patent drawing of 1895, the Cei-Rigotti is a device attached to a Swiss Schmidt–Rubin 1889 (or any other straight pull bolt-action rifle), converting it into an automatic weapon. A hole was drilled into the barrel and part of the gases generated during fire compress a spring which moves a piston that opens and closes the bolt.

The 1899 patent is similar, but it was attached to a rotating bolt action rifle instead and had a semi-automatic fire mode. According to Baker, a small hole was bored on the muzzle end of the barrel and part of the gases operate a rotary cylinder which opens the breech, extracts spent cartridges and closes the bolt, which then releases the striker, repeating the process until the rifle runs out of ammunition. In semi-auto mode, a lever-operated mechanism is used to interrupt the striker, requiring the shooter to pull the trigger to fire another round. Reportedly, this device could be attached to any Mauser bolt-action rifle without significantly increasing the weight. According to a Glisenti-Bettoni catalog, two different versions were made: a six-round infantry rifle and a navy 'machine gun-rifle' with a 20-round magazine; Morin mentions that prototypes with 30-round and 50-round magazines were reportedly made, while Baker mentions a 25-round magazine version.

The 1903 patent is an refinement of the previous prototypes. It features a small hole drilled on the right side of the barrel and connected to a cylinder where the gases are tapped in, moving a piston connected to the breechblock. A recoil spring mounted in the piston closes the breech automatically. According to W. H. B. Smith and Joseph E. Smith, the action stays open after the magazine is empty.

The 1911 patent (Note: Johnston and Nelson errouneously mention that it was the 1895 patent.) is a direct impingement action, with a piston system featuring two separate springs to open and close the breech. According to Johnston and Nelson, it was intended to soften the recoil, but also made the gun unnecessarily complicated.

Another unusual feature of the Cei-Rigotti was its trigger, which extended through a slot across the entirety of the trigger guard. It has been theorized that it was intended to make the weapon easier to operate in heavy gloves, but in reality it is used to release the bolt without accidentally firing the weapon. The trigger guard assembly was also connected to the magazine, and needed to be removed in order for the magazine to be replaced. This magazine is also a major point of contention among military historians, as, since the weapon was reloaded via stripper clips rather than detachable magazine, many argue that it disqualifies the Cei-Rigotti from being classified as an assault rifle.

Full sized rifle and carbine (both automatic and selective fire) prototypes were made. At least one Cei-Rigotti automatic carbine was tested by the British in 1901.

== History ==
The gun was supposedly presented by Cei-Rigotti to his superiors in a private demonstration in 1895. An Italian newspaper reported on this event in 1900. According to another source, a demonstration was actually held publicly in Rome on June 13, 1900, when 300 rounds were fired on full automatic before the gun got so hot it seized up. Yet another source mentions a demonstration in the same year in Brescia, where the inventor fired 15 shots in one second.

The British also ordered and tested the gun after this event, but they found it unsuitable. According to Johnston and Nelson, representants from Glisenti-Bettoni demonstrated the Cei-Rigotti at the Royal Small Arms Factory in March, 1901. British test reports noted that the rifle was nearly uncontrollable in full-automatic mode. The rifle found at the UK National Firearms Centre in Leeds is chambered in 7.65x53mm Mauser, as is another example found in a U.S. private collection.

The Italian War Ministry purchased a small batch of rifles in 1911 for trial tests in Libya, but like other Italian pre-WWI self-loading designs, no mass production ever took place.

== See also ==
=== Early automatic rifles ===
- Browning M1918 automatic rifle
- Fedorov M1916 Avtomat
- Furrer Leichtes Maschinengewehr lMG 25
- Huot M1916 automatic rifle

=== Early self loading rifles ===
- Farquhar-Hill P1918 semi automatic rifle
- Fusil Automatique Modèle 1917
