= Battle of Gruszówka =

1943 armed clash in Poland

- Part of the Massacres of the Poles in the Volhynia and Galicia during the Polish–Ukrainian ethnic conflict in the World War II
Date	31 August 1943
Location	Gruszówka
Result	Polish victory

Belligerents
Polish-self defence in Volhynia	Ukrainian Insurgent Army

Commanders and leaders
Unknown	Unknown

Strength
Unknown	Unknown

Casualties and losses
1 killed 2 wounded	20 killed

The Battle of Gruszówka was an armed clash on 31 August 1943, where Polish self-defence forces smashed the forces of the Banderites sotnias and inflicted heavy losses on them.

== Before the battle ==
Before the battle was fought, Zasmyki had been constantly harassed by Ukrainian forces, who murdered the population, as on 23 August in the colony of Piórkowicze, where civilians returning to their homesteads to get food were attacked by UPA units. After such incidents, the Poles issued a harsh letter to the Ukrainians, but the Banderites sent an ultimatum to the self-defence headquarters in Zasmyki, and as late as the evening of 31 August a Ukrainian peasant arrived in Zasmyki reporting preparations for an attack on Polish forces and masses of peasants.

== Battle ==
An attack by Ukrainian troops on Zasmyki was expected at the end of August 1943. The defence of this vast settlement was a difficult task due to the limited number of troops and the lack of adequate fortifications. In this situation, the commanders of the Polish units, "Jastrząb" and "Sokół", decided to carry out an offensive action to pre-empt the actions of the Ukrainian Insurgent Army (UPA). They adopted the tactic of defence by the attack and decided to surprise the Ukrainian forces gathered in Gruszówka.

In the evening of 30 August 1943, after reviewing the unit, replenishing ammunition and separating the sick, the 50-man unit set off. Together with the unit of cadet "Gronski", they set off along a circuitous route through the Litynski forest to the enemy's rear. The march, which lasted all night, was arduous, but the guides led the unit to the right place. On the morning of 31 August, the unit, having passed through bushes near a small lake, made a sudden attack on a dormant UPA unit.

The surprise was complete. The Ukrainians did not expect an attack from behind, from the side opposite Zasmyki. The Poles attacked from close range, using small arms and grenades, which forced the UPA to retreat into the bushes. In the first phase of the battle, Private Stanislaw Romankiewicz "Hare" was killed. His colleagues managed to load him onto a farm wagon, but during the retreat he was hit by a fatal series from an enemy erkaem. A Ukrainian machine gun, previously well dug in, hampered the Polish advance. Sergeant Jan Czajkowski "Lipiec" took advantage of the cover of thick pines and approached at a distance of several metres, neutralising the enemy with a long series from the machine gun. The captured Tokarev machine gun passed into the hands of Polish soldiers.

Lieutenant "Sokol" directed the third squad to the edge of the forest on the left side of the road. Despite enemy fire, a dozen Polish soldiers managed to come into close contact with the UPA positions. The systematic approach of the Polish soldiers forced the Ukrainians to flee. On the left wing, the team of PFC Edmund Gawłowicz "Błysek" was attacked by several dozen people. As a result of a grenade explosion, the squad leader was seriously wounded and called for help. On the right wing, cadet Tadeusz Korona "Groński" captured carts with ammunition and a field kitchen full of poultry prepared for the UPA. Agricultural equipment intended for the murder of the Zasmyk population was also captured. The fighting gradually quietened down and the scattered UPA fighters tried to re-group, but they no longer posed much of a threat.

== Aftermath ==
The victory of the Polish unit was complete. The threatening grouping of bandits was broken up and dispersed. The Poles captured a hand-held machine gun, a dozen rifles and a considerable amount of ammunition.
