= Charlton automatic rifle =

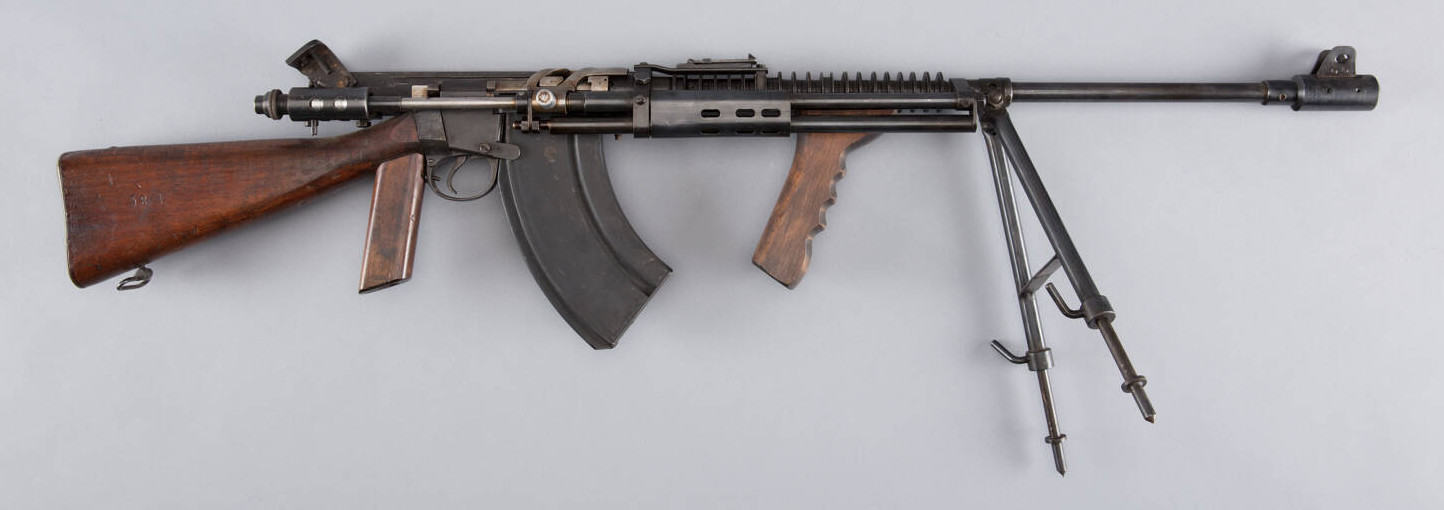
- Type: Semi-automatic rifle Light machine gun/Automatic rifle
- Place of origin: New Zealand

Service history
- In service: 1942–1945
- Used by: New Zealand

Production history
- Designer: Philip Charlton
- Designed: 1941
- Produced: 1942–1945
- No. built: 1500
- Variants: Electrolux SMLE Model

Specifications
- Mass: 16 lb (7.3 kg), unloaded
- Length: 44.5 in (1150 mm)
- Cartridge: .303 British
- Calibre: 0.3125 inch (7.938 mm)
- Action: Gas-operated semi-automatic
- Rate of fire: 600 rounds/minute
- Muzzle velocity: 2,440 ft/s (744 m/s)
- Effective firing range: 1,000 yards (910 m)
- Maximum firing range: 2,000 yards (1830 m)
- Feed system: 10-round magazine or modified 30-round Bren gun magazine
- Sights: Sliding ramp rear sights, fixed post front sights

The Charlton automatic rifle was a fully automatic conversion of the Lee–Enfield rifle, designed by New Zealander Philip Charlton in 1941 to act as a substitute for the Bren and Lewis gun light machine guns which were in severely short supply at the time.

== Description ==
The original Charlton automatic rifles were converted from obsolete Lee–Metford and magazine Lee–Enfield rifles dating from as early as the Boer War, and were intended for use as semi-automatic rifles with the full-automatic capabilities retained for emergency use. It used the 10-round Lee–Enfield magazines and modified 30-round Bren magazines. The weapon was never intended for use as a frontline combat weapon, instead being designed and adopted primarily for the New Zealand Home Guard.

There were two versions of the Charlton: the New Zealand version, as designed and manufactured by Charlton Motor Workshops in Hastings, and a version produced in Australia by Electrolux, using the SMLE Mk III* for conversion. The two designs differed markedly in external appearance (amongst other things, the New Zealand Charlton had a forward pistol grip and bipod, whilst the Australian lacked this, making it lighter and cleaner in appearance), but shared the same operating mechanism.

Approximately 1,500 Charlton automatic rifles were manufactured in New Zealand, and nearly all of them were suspected as destroyed in an accidental fire at the ordnance depot located at the Palmerston North Showgrounds on 31 December 1944. Although substantial quantities of clothing and general stores were destroyed, the evidence does not support the assertion that the majority of Charlton rifles were lost in the fire. The enduring belief that most Charltons were destroyed at Palmerston North appears to stem from later secondary accounts rather than the contemporary record.

Nonetheless, very few Charlton automatic rifles are known to survive. Examples are found in the Imperial War Museum in London and the National Firearms Centre at the Royal Armouries Museum in Leeds in the United Kingdom; the Waiouru Army Museum and the Auckland War Memorial museum in New Zealand; and the Army Museum (Bandiana) in Australia.

== See also ==
- Ekins automatic rifle
- Howard Francis semi-automatic carbine
- Howell automatic rifle
- Huot automatic rifle
- Rieder automatic rifle

== Bibliography ==
- Skennerton, Ian The Lee-Enfield Story (1993). Arms & Militaria Press, Australia. ISBN 1-85367-138-X
- Skennerton, Ian Small Arms Identification Series No. 13: Special Service Lee-Enfields; Commando & Auto Models (2001). Arms & Militaria Press, Australia. ISBN 0-949749-37-0
