= Howell automatic rifle =

Howell semi-automatic rifle
- Type: Semi-automatic rifle
- Place of origin: United Kingdom

Service history
- Used by: United Kingdom
- Wars: World War I

Production history
- Produced: 1915

Specifications
- Cartridge: .303 British
- Action: Gas-operated
- Feed system: 10 / 20 round box magazine
- Sights: Iron sights

The Howell automatic rifle was a semi-automatic conversion of the Lee–Enfield rifle. The gun was regarded as unwieldy; the gas piston was located on the right side of the gun, and the force of the recoiling bolt interfered with handling. The gun was described as "dramatic" when fired, though the weapon was ultimately deemed reliable. Similar conversions were the South African Rieder and Charlton of New Zealand origin, both of which had full automatic capability.

== Design ==
The rifle featured a pistol grip comprising a simple metal tube, and used extended SMLE magazines, as Bren magazines such as those used on the Charlton would be too wide to fit the Howell's receiver. The bolt was cycled by a simple gas piston on the side of the rifle, with the bolt handle being removed to accommodate the contoured cam.

== History ==
Early in World War II, when supplies were low, Howell rifles were considered as an anti-aircraft weapon for the Home Guard, though none were ever issued.

== See also ==
- Huot Automatic Rifle
