= Tokarev Model 1927 =

Tokarev 1927
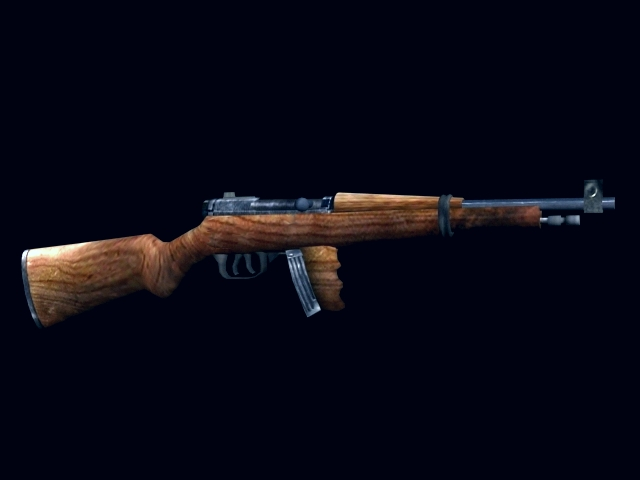
- Computer-generated model
- Type: Submachine gun
- Place of origin: Soviet Union

Production history
- Designer: Fedor Vasilevich Tokarev

Specifications
- Mass: 3.3kg (with two loaded magazines, one located in the butt); 2.8kg (with said magazines empty)
- Length: 805mm
- Cartridge: 7.62×38mmR Nagant
- Caliber: 7.62mm
- Barrels: 1
- Action: blowback
- Rate of fire: 1100-1200rpm
- Muzzle velocity: 302m/s
- Effective firing range: 200m
- Feed system: 21 round box magazine
- Sights: Iron

The Tokarev Model 1927 submachine gun was an experimental firearm developed in the Soviet Union under the leadership of Fedor Vasilievich Tokarev as part of the Soviet Union's drive to be self-sufficient in armaments. It was a blowback-operated, two trigger weapon which fired a 7.62 mm round originally intended as a revolver round.

Before it could go into production other manufacturers produced their own submachine guns. In competitive trials a weapon designed by Degtyarev proved superior and further development of the Tokarev was halted.

== Origin ==
Owing to supply problems, in 1924 the Soviet leadership decided to abandon all weapons using foreign ammunition. As a consequence, production of the Fedorov Avtomat was halted in 1925 and was withdrawn from service by 1928. In 1925 the Soviet Army commission for weapons decided that submachine guns should be introduced into army service, initially as offensive weapons for low-ranking officers. Consequently, a contest was started the following year for such weapons. Tokarev, who was familiar with Fedorov's work, decided to take up the challenge of producing a suitable substitute weapon that would work with permissible ammunition. This resulted in the first Soviet-made submachine gun using the 7.62×38mmR revolver round, because at the time there was no Soviet automatic pistol round accepted for army use.

== Description ==
The 1927 Tokarev is a blowback-operated weapon, capable of selective fire, which is achieved by using two triggers. The rear trigger fired a single shot, while the front trigger was for fully automatic fire. The butt of the gun has a storage cavity for an additional magazine. The firearm is sighted for either 100 or 200 meters, adjustable by flipping up one of the two peephole sights on the receiver. A carbine prototype was also produced; it has a single trigger, slightly longer barrel, and adjustable sights up to 800 meters, despite using the same weak cartridge; an exemplar of both variants can now be found at the Military Historical Museum of Artillery, Engineers and Signal Corps in Saint Petersburg.

== Prototype trials ==
Only a handful of these submachine guns had been ordered for trial purposes, when in July 1928 the Soviet Army leadership decided that a single new automatic cartridge should be developed for both automatic pistols and submachine guns, to be obtained by modifying the 7.63×25mm Mauser round down to the Soviet machinery standard of 7.62 mm. Tokarev had to adapt his design to this new ammunition. By then the competition had been joined by designs from Degtyarev and Korovin, who designed their weapons directly for the new round. Trials were conducted in July 1930, pitted Tokarev models chambered for both rounds against these other two domestic competitors. The Army commission was rather dissatisfied with all guns presented at this trial. Eventually, in Feb 1931, the army ordered 500 Tokarevs chambered in the revolver round, to be sent to the troops for more extensive trials. The feedback received from the troops was apparently negative. The number of Tokarev submachine guns (chambered in the Nagant round) actually produced and delivered remains uncertain.

Between 1932 and 1933 yet more trials were held, with 14 different submachine gun samples from Tokarev, Degtyarev, Korovin, Prilutsk and Kolesnikov. The army commission eliminated the guns of Korovin, Prilutsk and Kolesnikov as unsatisfactory due to their unreliable cycling. Ultimately it was a showdown between Degtyarev and Tokarev's gun, but except for weight, Degtyarev's model proved superior in all other departments: accuracy, muzzle velocity, a lower rate of fire (as desired by the army), ease of handling and reliability. Degtyarev's model was eventually commissioned in 1935 as the PPD-34.

== See also ==
- List of Russian weaponry
