= Maxim–Tokarev =

Maxim-Tokarev
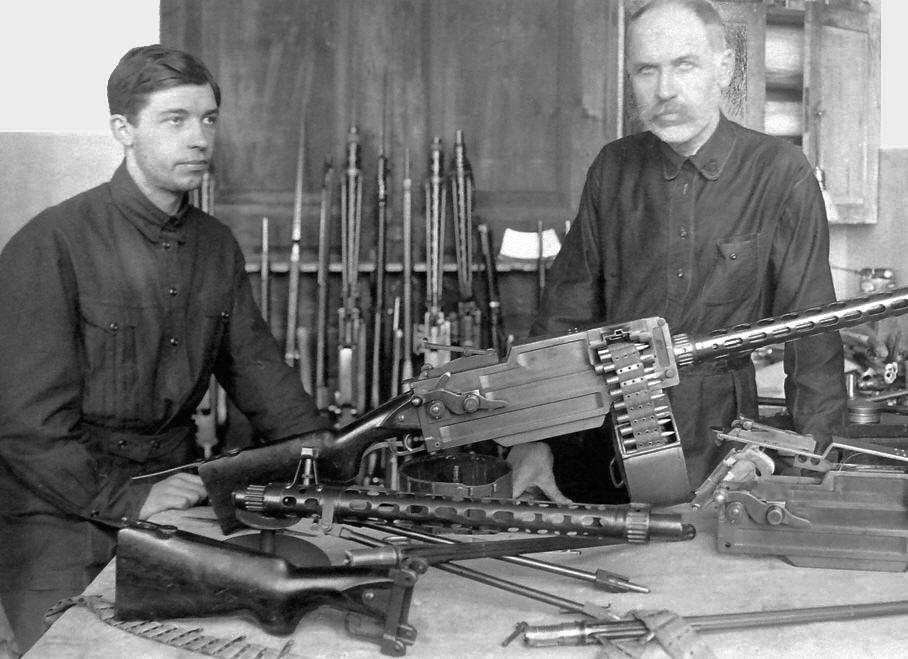
- Tokarev and his son posing with their model 1925 machine gun
- Type: Light machine gun
- Place of origin: Soviet Union

Service history
- Used by: See § Users
- Wars: See § Conflicts

Production history
- Designer: Fedor Tokarev
- Designed: 1924
- Produced: 1925–1927
- No. built: 2,500

Specifications
- Mass: 12.9 kg (28 lb) empty 15.5 kg (34 lb) with typical ammo load
- Length: 1,330 mm (52.36 in)
- Barrel length: 650 mm (25.59 in)
- Cartridge: 7.62×54mmR
- Caliber: 7.62 mm
- Action: Short recoil, toggle locked
- Rate of fire: Cyclic: ~600 rounds/min
- Feed system: Belt-feed, 100-round belt
- Sights: Iron

The Maxim–Tokarev (sometimes shortened to MT or M-T) was the first domestic Soviet light machine gun accepted for service. It was developed from the Maxim machine gun M1910 by Fedor Tokarev.

== History ==
During World War I and the Russian Civil War, the Soviet army was equipped with light machine guns of foreign manufacture, mostly with the Lewis gun, the Chauchat and the Hotchkiss M1909. By the 1920s, these guns were showing their age, and owing to the Soviet Union's international diplomatic isolation, neither spare parts nor ammunition could be easily obtained for these guns.

In 1923 GAU emergency program was initiated for equipping the Red army with a light machine gun chambered for the domestic 7.62×54mmR.

The first design submitted was the Maxim-Kolesnikov, designed by Ivan Nikolaevich Kolesnikov at the Kovrov Arms Factory, followed soon thereafter by the Maxim–Tokarev, designed by Fedor Vasilievich Tokarev at the Tula Arsenal. During field tests conducted in early 1925, Tokarev's model proved superior, so it was adopted on May 26.

Of the 2,500 Maxim–Tokarev guns were produced by Tula arms factory (TOZ) in 1926–27; 1,400 were supplied to China between 1938 and 1939 in the Sino-Soviet Aid Program. The rest were sent to the Republican forces during the Spanish Civil War It was replaced in Soviet service by the much lighter DP.

== Structure ==
A US Army analysis mentions that "Tokarev was doubtless inspired by both the German Parabellum and the British Vickers. The arrangement of the trigger and the shoulder stock resembles very strongly that illustrated in United States Patent No. 942167, which was granted in 1909 to Dawson and Buckham, assignors to Vickers."

The water jacket of the Maxim M1910 was discarded and replaced by a thin perforated steel jacket. The barrel was shortened and lightened from 2.1 kg (4 lb 10 oz) to 1.7 kg (3 lb 12 oz). A mechanism for changing the barrel in field conditions was provided. The spade grips were replaced with a rifle-type stock and the thumb-trigger was replaced by a rifle-type trigger. A folding bipod with tubular legs was attached to the barrel jacket.

The canvas-belt feed system was the same as on PM M1910 guns, except the standard belt capacity was reduced to 100 rounds. The 100-round belts were usually carried in separate drum-type containers, inspired from the German MG 08/15. The barrel rifling was 4 right-turns in 240 mm (9.4 in).

== Users ==
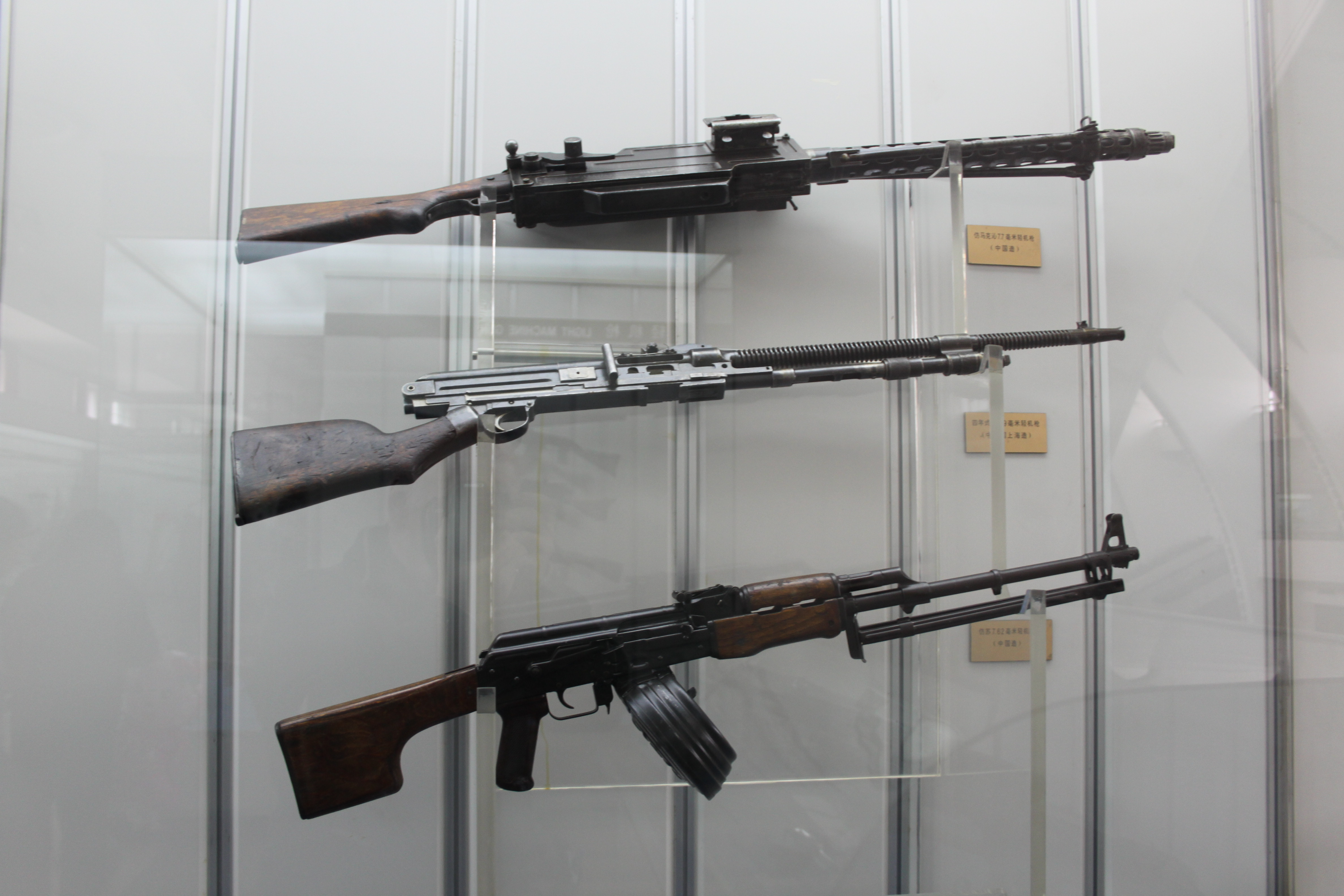
Maxim–Tokarev MG on top, Type 11 LMG in the middle and a RPK LMG at the bottom.

- Soviet Union
- Republic of China
- People's Republic of China
- North Korea
- Spain

== Conflicts ==
- Spanish Civil War
- 2^{nd} Sino-Japanese War
- World War II
- Korean War

== See also ==
- Browning M1919
- PV-1 machine gun
- List of Russian weaponry
