= Fedor Tokarev =

Russian and Soviet weapons designer (1871–1968)

Fedor Vasilyevich Tokarev Фёдор Васи́льевич То́карев
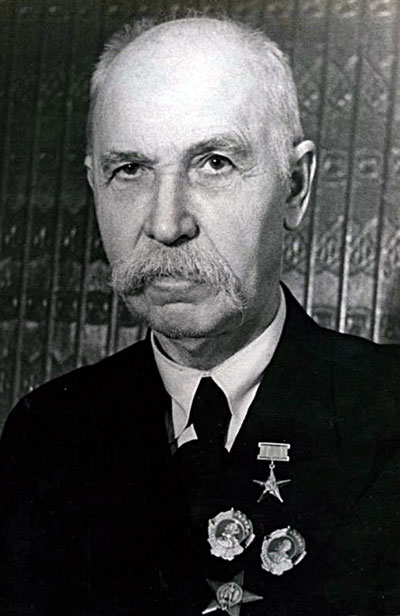
- Born: 14 June 1871; Yegorlykskaya, Don Host Oblast, Russian Empire
- Died: 6 March 1968 (aged 96); Moscow, Russian SFSR

Fedor Vasilievich Tokarev (Russian: Фёдор Васи́льевич То́карев; 14 June [O.S. 2 June] 1871 – 6 March 1968) was a Russian weapons designer and deputy of the Supreme Soviet of the USSR from 1937 to 1950.

== Career ==
Outside the former Soviet Union he is best known as the designer of the Maxim–Tokarev light machine gun, the Tokarev TT-30 and TT-33 self-loading pistol, and the Tokarev SVT-38 and SVT-40 self-loading rifle, both of which were produced in large numbers during fighting on the Eastern Front of World War II. For his contributions to Soviet arms design Tokarev received the Hero of Socialist Labor award and the USSR State Prize.

He also designed the prototype of the FT-1 / ФТ-1 panoramic camera (FT stands for: Fotoapparat Tokareva / Фотоаппарат Токарева).

== Biography ==
At age of 14 he began work in his father's shop.

- 1888 – Admitted to the Military Vocational School at Novocherkassk; age 17
- 1892 – Graduated as Cossack noncommissioned officer and sent to the 12th Don Cossack Regiment as an armorer-artificer; age 21.
- 1896 – Returned to Novecherkassk as Master Armorer Instructor; age 25. Applied for admittance to the Military Technical School.
- 1900 – Graduated as a Cossack commissioned officer, age 29, and returned to his old unit, the 12th Don Cossack Regiment as Master Gunsmith.

In 1908 - 1910 he made his version of a conversion of the bolt-action Model 1891 Mosin–Nagant rifle to semi-automatic fire, which merited official testing.

- 1927 – Designed Tokarev Model 1927 submachine gun prototype.

In June 1930 his self-loading pistol (TT) was adopted as standard service pistol for Red Army

- 1940–41 – Defended habilitation in technical sciences. Received the Hero of Socialist Labor award and the USSR State Prize.

Tokarev's son Nikolai (1899–1972) also became a prominent firearms designer. He worked for several decades in Tula and designed several machine guns and anti-aircraft guns that were used by the Soviet Army in the 1930s–1940s.

== See also ==
- List of Russian inventors
