= Rieder automatic rifle =

- Type: Automatic rifle
- Place of origin: South Africa

Production history
- Designed: 1940
- Produced: 1941

Specifications
- Length: 1130 mm
- Cartridge: .303 British
- Action: Gas/bolt action
- Feed system: 10-round magazine or 30-round Bren gun magazine
- Sights: Iron

The Rieder automatic rifle was a fully automatic Lee–Enfield SMLE rifle conversion of South African origin. The Rieder device could be installed quickly with the use of simple tools. A similar weapon of New Zealand origin was the Charlton automatic rifle.

While the rifle had no select fire capability, single shots could be achieved by releasing the trigger quickly. Alternatively the bolt could be operated manually if the gas vein was closed. Prototype rifles fitted with the "Rieder attachment" or device were tested on bipod and tripod mounts and proved reliable with little maintenance, although recommendations were made to change the sight system to take account of vibration during automatic fire.

The rifle was discontinued in 1941 after it was discovered to have overheating issues after firing 100 rounds, as well as non-durable springs.

== See also ==
- Ekins automatic rifle
- Howard Francis semi-automatic carbine
- Howell automatic rifle
- Huot automatic rifle
