= Select fire =

Firearm firing mode

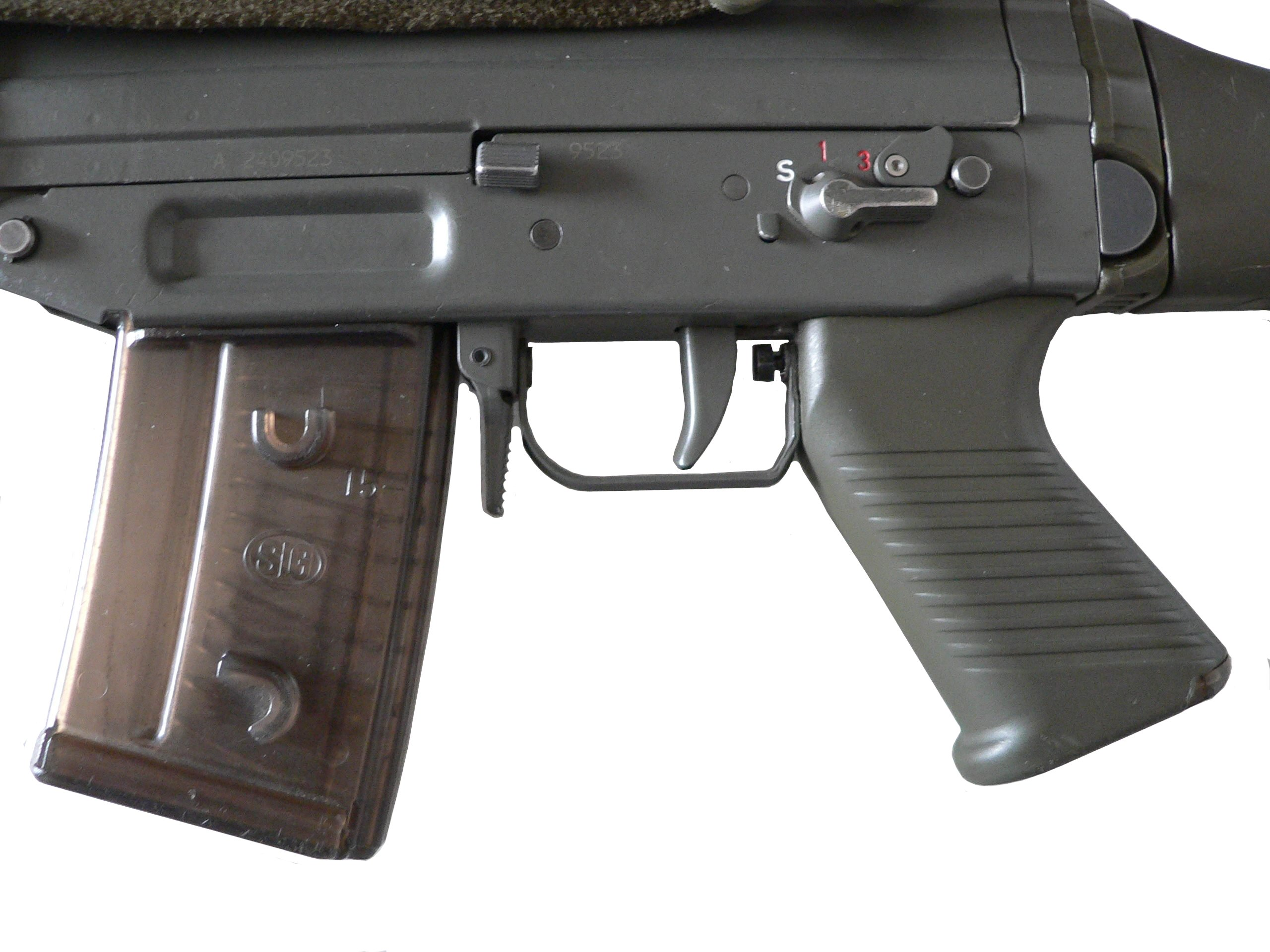
The SIG 550 has four modes: safe (at which the rifle cannot be fired; S), one round (1), three-round burst (3) and full automatic (obscured by the switch lever).

Select fire is the capability of a weapon to be adjusted to fire in semi-automatic, fully automatic, or burst mode. The modes are chosen by means of a fire selector switch, which varies depending on the weapon's design. Some select-fire weapons have burst fire mechanisms to limit the maximum number of shots fired automatically in this mode. The most common limits are two or three rounds per trigger pull. Fully automatic fire is the ability for a weapon to fire continuously until either the feeding mechanism is emptied or the trigger is released. Semi-automatic is the ability to fire one round per trigger pull without manually cycling the action, as is necessary with, for example, bolt-action firearms.

The presence of select fire modes on firearms permits more efficient use of rounds to be fired for specific needs, versus having a single mode of operation, such as fully automatic, thereby conserving ammunition while maximizing on-target accuracy and effectiveness. This capability is most commonly found on military weapons of the 20th and 21st centuries.

== History ==
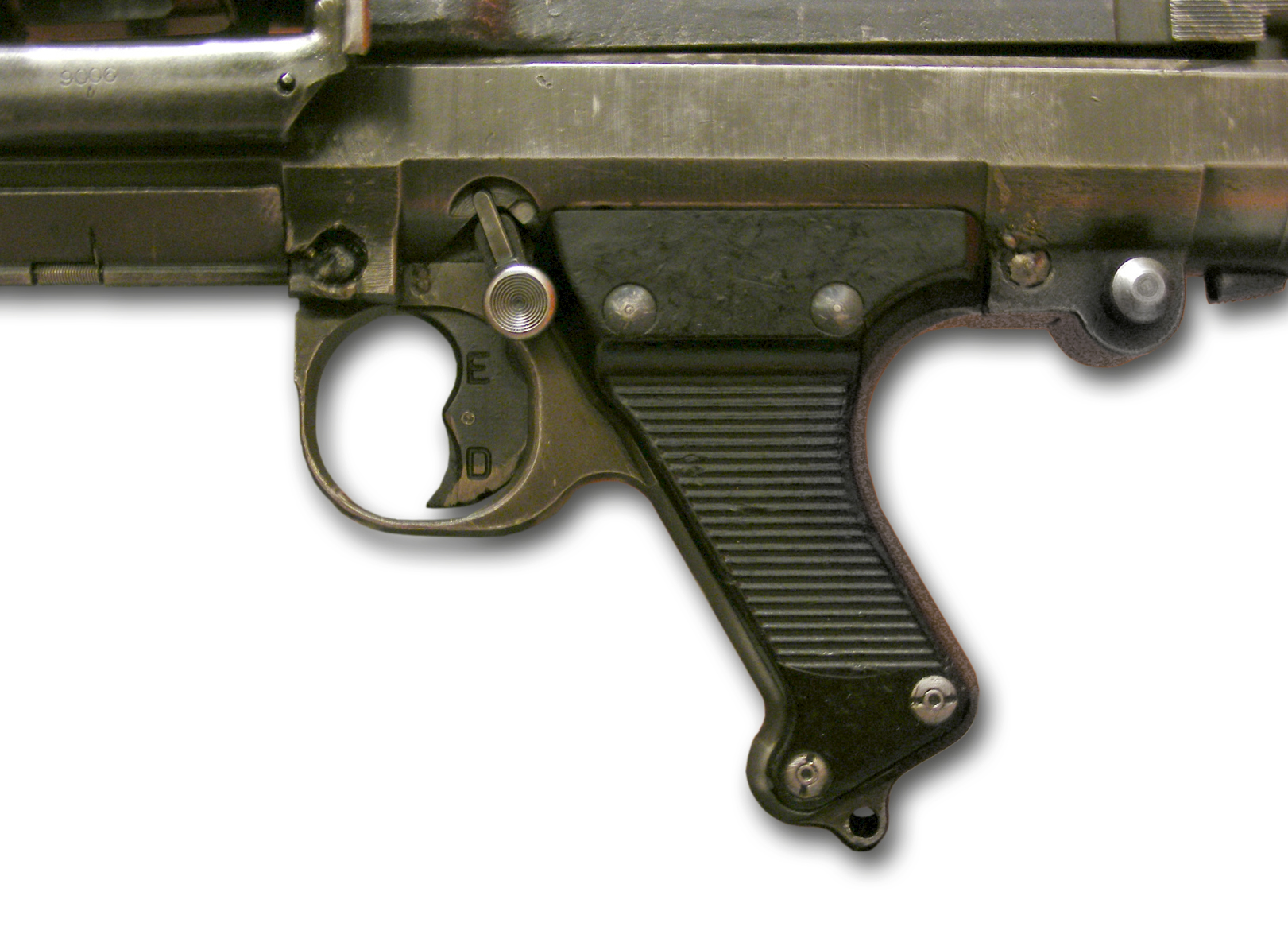
MG 34 machine gun: double-crescent trigger, E=semi-automatic fire, D=full automatic fire

Early attempts at this technology were hindered by one or both of two obstacles: over-powerful ammunition and mechanical complexity. The latter led to excessive weight and unreliability in the firearm. One of the earliest designs dates to just before the end of the 19th century with the development of the Cei-Rigotti, an early automatic rifle created by Italian Army officer Amerigo Cei-Rigotti that had select-fire capability (single shots or burst).

Another is the M1918 Browning Automatic Rifle (BAR) developed during the First World War. The BAR and its subsequent designs incorporated a variety of select-fire functions. The first design (M1918) is a select-fire, air-cooled automatic rifle that used a trigger mechanism with a fire selector lever that enabled operating in either semi-automatic or fully automatic firing modes. The selector lever is located on the left side of the receiver and is simultaneously the manual safety (selector lever in the "S" position – weapon is "safe", "F" – "Fire", "A" – "Automatic" fire). The next version (M1918A1) had a unique rate-of-fire reducer mechanism purchased from FN Herstal with two rates of automatic fire. This reducer mechanism was later changed to one designed by the Springfield Armory. The final version (M1918A2) provided two selectable rates of fully automatic fire only.

During World War II the Germans began development of the select-fire function which resulted in the FG 42 battle rifle developed in 1942 at the request of the German Air Force (Luftwaffe) in 1941. Another German design that used select fire was the StG 44 that was the first of its kind to see major deployment and is considered by many historians to be the first modern assault rifle. "The principle of this weapon -- the reduction of muzzle impulse to get useful automatic fire within actual ranges of combat -- was probably the most important advance in small arms since the invention of smokeless powder."

The select-fire function was later seen in the Russian AK-47 (designed in 1946), the Belgian FN FAL (designed 1947–53) the British EM-2 (designed in 1948), and the U.S. AR-10 (designed in 1957) and its AR derivatives.

== Design ==
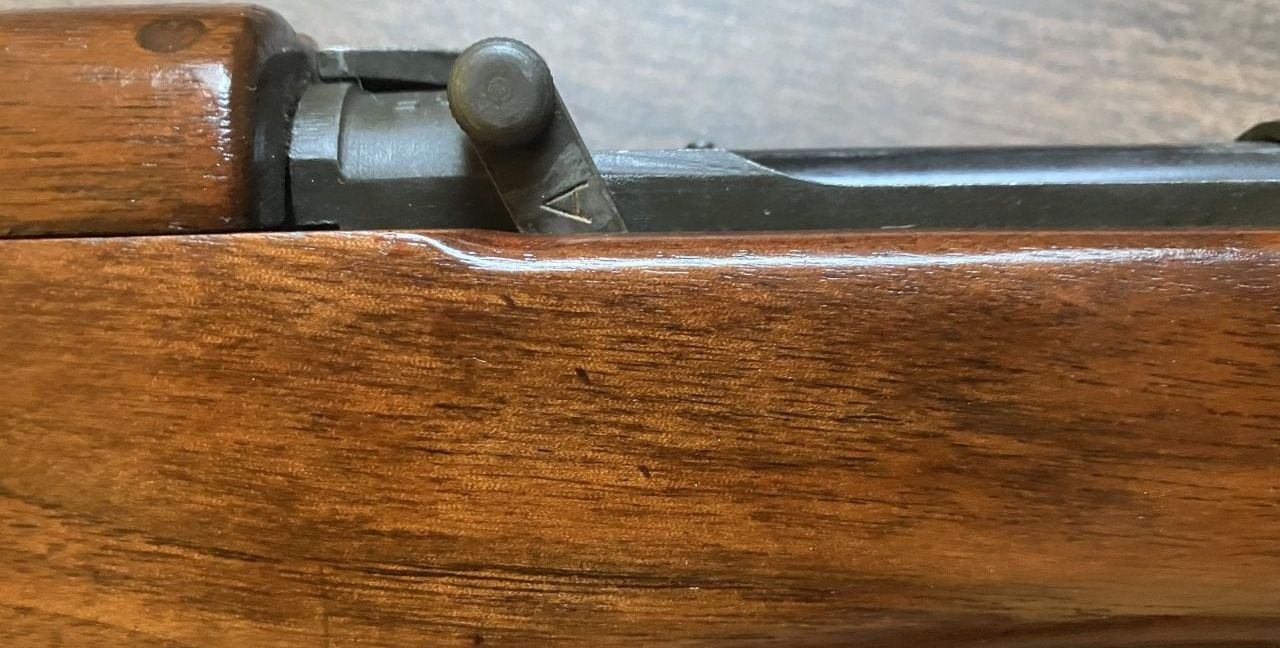
Close up of M2 Carbine selector switch. The switch is between semi and full-auto, with the safety located on the other side of the weapon.

Select-fire weapons, by definition, have a semi-automatic mode, where the weapon automatically reloads the chamber after each fired round, but requires the trigger be released and pulled again before firing the next round. This allows for rapid and (in theory) aimed fire. In some weapons, the selection is between different rates of automatic fire and/or varying burst limiters. The selection is often by a small rotating switch often integrated with the safety catch or a switch separate from the safety, as in the British SA80 family. Another method is a weighted trigger, such as the Steyr AUG, which will fire a single shot when 4.0 - 7.1 kg (8.8 – 15.4 lbs.) of weight is exerted on the trigger, and then become fully automatic when over 7.1 kg (15.4 lbs.) of weight is applied. This is useful for emergency situations where a rapid volley of rounds is more effective for suppressing a close enemy rather than a single-round burst (multiple single shots with a trigger pull for each round).

Some select-fire weapons offer a burst mode as the second option, where each pull of the trigger automatically fires a predetermined number of rounds (generally two or three), but will not fire any more until the trigger is released and pulled again. The current U.S. standard assault rifle, the M16A4, and the M4 carbine variant of this rifle fire a maximum of three rounds with each pull of the trigger in burst mode. In this design, it retains the count of previously fired rounds and may fire fewer than three rounds. Other designs reset the count with each trigger pull, allowing a uniform three-round burst as long as rounds remain.

A common version of the Heckler & Koch MP5 submachine gun (which is widely used by SWAT teams and military special operations personnel) fires single shots, three-round-bursts, and automatically. A special variant uses a two-round-burst to minimize the chances of missing with a third round. Some automatic cannons have larger burst limiters to coincide with higher rates of fire.

== See also ==
- Auto sear
- Bump stock, an attachment used by semi-automatic rifles to simulate fully automatic fire
- List of firearms
- Selective-fire shotgun
