= Huot Automatic Rifle =

Canadian WWI-era light machine gun project

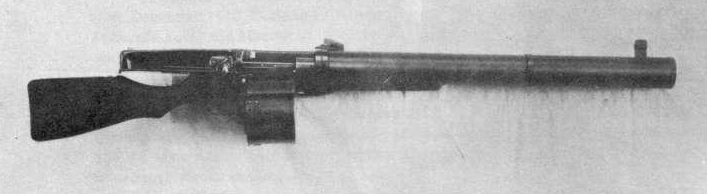
- A Huot Automatic Rifle
- Type: Automatic rifle Light machine gun
- Place of origin: Canada

Service history
- Used by: Canadian Army

Production history
- Designer: Joseph Alphonse Huot
- Designed: 1916
- Produced: c. 1917–1918
- No. built: At least 5

Specifications
- Mass: 13 lb (5.9 kg) (empty); 19 lb (8.6 kg) (loaded)
- Length: 47 in (1,194 mm)
- Barrel length: 25 in (635 mm)
- Cartridge: .303 British
- Action: Gas-operated reloading
- Rate of fire: 475 rounds/min (cyclic); 155 rounds/min (continuous)
- Feed system: 25-round detachable drum magazine
- Sights: Iron sights

The Huot Automatic Rifle was a Canadian World War I era light machine gun project.

== Design and development ==
In 1916, the Canadian Expeditionary Force was desperately short of light machine guns. Since the Ross rifle had finally been taken out of service, there were large numbers of surplus rifles.

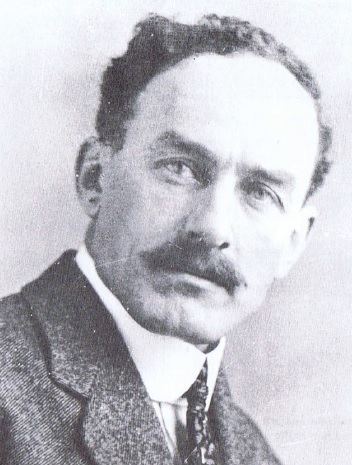
Joseph Alphonse Huot (1918)

That year, Joseph Huot, an engineer from Richmond, Quebec, adapted the Ross' straight-pull bolt action. His sample model, which shared 33 parts with the Ross Mark III, had a pneumatic piston parallel to the barrel, which moved a sleeve on the bolt backwards, operating the action. To absorb excess energy, the bolt was buffered. The entire mechanism was sheathed in sheet metal. Huot copied the cooling system from the Lewis Gun, then standard in British Army service. It fed from a 25-round drum magazine. He filed Canadian patents; #193724 on 8 March 1917 (granted 4 November 1919) and #193725 on 13 November 1917.

Early in September 1916, he approached the government to license-produce the weapon, meeting with a Colonel Matyche on 8 September, and was hired by the Government Small Arms Experimental Department.

The Dominion Rifle Factory (formerly the Ross rifle factory) built a finished version of the design, under the supervision of Assistant Inspector of Small Arms Major Robert Mills of the Seaforth Highlanders. It was tested at Quebec City on 12 November 1916, with a second 650-round trial of an improved version on 15 February 1917. The Master-General of Ordnance, Blair, demanded a third test, firing 11,000 rounds (half Dominion Cartridge Company, half Dominion Arsenal) on 5–6 March 1917. The Huot was also examined at the Rockcliffe Rifle Range on 22 October 1917, which led S. C. Meuburn to recommend it be adopted by the British Army.

To further this aim, Blair, A.A. Janson, and Huot sailed for Britain, arriving at Sandling, Hythe on 10 January 1918, for an extensive British trial at the arms testing establishment at RSAF Enfield. This took place between 19–21 March 1918, and the Huot competed against the Lewis, Hotchkiss, and Farquhar-Hill. The results appeared favorable. "The Huot did better in some tests than the Lewis. It was superior in snapshooting from a trench, in quickness of getting into action..." Even muddy, after firing four or five clearing rounds, it would function again, without the need for stripping and cleaning; Blair noted it was the only weapon on the trial able to suffer immersion and do so.

In firing 10,000 rounds through the Huot, Enfield uncovered fouling of the gas cylinder at 4,000 rounds, and the barrel worn out at 10,000. Since this example had already had some 11,000 rounds fired through it before coming into Enfield's hands, this is understandable. Using all varieties of Mark VII ammunition it would be likely to encounter (including K, KN, J, and US), they found the Huot had no major problems, though there were unexplained stoppages, and it did not require the specially chosen ammunition the Lewis did. Furthermore, the Huot proved able to fire 4,000 rounds without oiling or cleaning; which the Lewis was unable to do.

In a 22 October 1917 letter to the British Minister of Munitions, Blair said tooling existed in Canada and the Dominion Factory was ready to begin manufacturing the Huot, using parts from Rosses scheduled for scrapping. After exposure to it in France, Lieutenant-General Arthur Currie, commanding the Canadian Corps, reported every soldier to come in contact with the Huot liked it, and on 1 October 1918 wrote requesting 5,000 be purchased, arguing casualties required increased firepower for each remaining man, as well as to allow his men to answer the growing number of German light machine guns. It was disliked for its physical appearance, but at C$50, it was considerably cheaper than the original C$1,000 cost of the Lewis.

One drawback was the Huot was fully automatic only, with no provision for semi-automatic fire. The magazine could be emptied in just 3.2 seconds (a drawback shared by the Browning Automatic Rifle); however, the rate of fire was low, much like a Bren Gun's, so that was not a problem. A magazine could be changed in four seconds, and an empty magazine could be filled with ammunition in 30 seconds. The Huot used a 25-round stripper clip to fill the drum magazine. In addition, the Huot functioned just as well upside-down.

Enfield noted 13 flaws, all with simple fixes, remarking "converting the Ross was not a complicated matter." Field trials in France showed "well authenticated" reports of few breakages or stoppages.

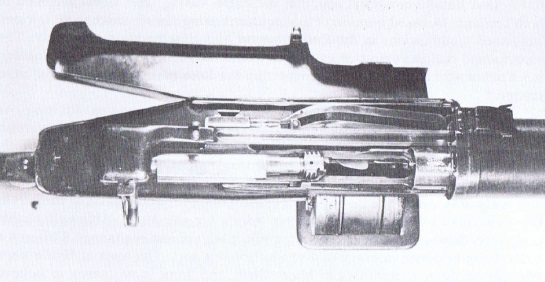
View inside the Huot breech

Enfield recommended a number of changes: the barrel cover be fitted with a continuous length of tubing and a wooden forend, allowing the weapon to dispense with the rest, which was criticized for its fragility; a corrugated metal cover be fitted to the body, with a dust shield over the bolt handle; the magazine mouth be bevelled to ease feeding; the magazine be made of thinner metal to reduce its excessive weight; the breech cover not extend so far back to prevent injury to the firer; strengthen the extractor to prevent failures to feed with thick-rimmed cases (one of the few feeding problems noted); the hand-cocking lever be deleted [a puzzle as the weapons still has to be cocked for the first shot], also removing eight new parts; and the barrel casing be made in one piece, to eliminate a minor double failure issue.

The war ended before it entered service, and the idea was dropped. Huot was out of pocket about C$30,000.

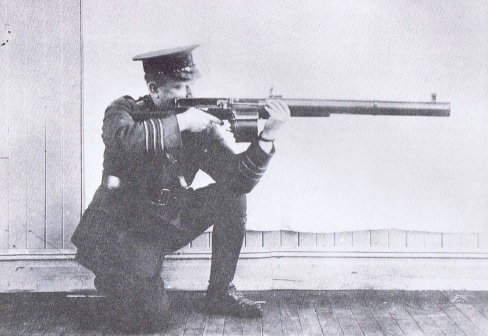
Major Robert Blair with a Huot

Four specimens are known to exist (2015). Serial # 1 - The Army Museum at the Halifax Citadel, Nova Scotia. Serial # 2 - The Seaforth Highlanders of Canada Museum and Archives, Vancouver, British Columbia. This was Colonel Blair's personal souvenir and is complete with the stripper clip and heavy leather carrying/shipping case. Shipping company stickers on this case indicate that this is one of the Huots taken overseas for testing. Serial # 4 - Canadian War Museum, Ottawa, Ontario. Serial # 5 - Canadian War Museum, Ottawa, Ontario. Serial # 3 has not been located and it is uncertain how many were built.

== See also ==
- M1918 Browning automatic rifle
- Charlton automatic rifle
- Lmg 25
- Kulsprutegevär m/40
- Mendoza RM2
- Rieder automatic rifle
- Weibel M/1932
