= List of .30-06 Springfield firearms =

The below table gives a list of firearms that can fire the .30-06 Springfield cartridge (7.62×63mm in metric notation). The cartridge was originally developed from the round-nosed .30-03 Springfield cartridge as a response to the adoption of spitzer bullets by various European armies in the late 19th to early 20th century. It was the service cartridge of the U.S. military from its adoption in 1906 until 1957, when it started being replaced by 7.62×51mm NATO as the standard U.S. military cartridge. The .30-06 is still common in the 21st century as a popular cartridge for hunting, notably in North America.

This table is sortable for every column.

Name	Type	Country	Image	Years of service	Notes
FN Model 24 and Model 30	Bolt-action rifle	Belgium		1924–1986	Export variants.
FN Model 1949	Semi-automatic rifle	Belgium		1949–1982	
FN Model D	Light machine gun	Belgium		1940s–	Belgian variant of M1918 Browning Automatic Rifle.
Mosquetão Itajubá M1949	Bolt-action rifle	Brazil		1949–1968	Variant of Model 1908/34 short rifle.
Mosquetão Itajubá M954	Bolt-action rifle	Brazil		1954–1968	Mosquetão M1949 variant with ability to launch rifle grenade.
Mosquetão Semi-Automático M954	Semi-automatic rifle	Brazil		1954–1964	Brazilian variant of Gewehr 43.
Lewis Assault Phase Rifle	Automatic rifle	United States		1918	Prototype and testing only.
Madsen M47	Bolt-action rifle	Denmark		1951–1960s	
Madsen machine gun	Light machine gun	Denmark		1946–	Export variants.
Madsen-Saetter machine gun	General-purpose machine gun	Denmark		1952–present	
Breda Bren gun	Light machine gun	Italy		1959–1970s	Italian variant of the British Bren gun, made by Breda.
Mexican Mauser Model 1954	Bolt-action rifle	Mexico		1954–present	
Mendoza RM2	Light machine gun	Mexico		1947–	
K98kF1	Bolt-action rifle	Norway		1953–present	Rechambered from the original 7.92×57mm Mauser.
MG34F1	General-purpose machine gun	Norway		1953–1970s	Rechambered from the original 7.92×57mm Mauser.
SIG MG 50	General-purpose machine gun	Switzerland		1951–	
Type 41 light machine gun	Light machine gun	Taiwan		1950s–	Taiwanese variant of the British Bren gun.
M1903 Springfield	Bolt-action rifle	United States		1906–1970s	
M1917 Enfield	Bolt-action rifle	United States		1917–present	
Winchester Model 70	Bolt-action rifle	United States		1936–present	
M1922 Bang rifle	Semi-automatic rifle	United States		1922	Prototype and testing only.
Thompson Autorifle	Semi-automatic rifle	United States		1923	Prototype and testing only.
M1 Garand	Semi-automatic rifle	United States		1936–present	
M8 /X01 "Garage Gun"	Battle rifle	United States		1950s	Prototype and testing only.
M1941 Johnson rifle	Semi-automatic rifle	United States		1941–1961	
M1947 Johnson auto carbine	Semi-automatic rifle	United States		1947	Derived from M1941 Johnson machine gun.
Model 45A	Battle rifle / Automatic rifle	United States; Commonwealth of the Philippines		1945	Prototype and testing only.
Sieg automatic rifle	Battle rifle / Automatic rifle	United States		1946	Prototype and testing only.
M1903-06 Gatling	Heavy machine gun	United States		1906–1911	.30-06 Springfield variant of the Gatling gun.
M1904 Maxim	Heavy machine gun	United States		1906–1918	US variant of the Maxim machine gun.
M1909 Benét–Mercié	Light machine gun	United States		1909–1918	US variant of the French Hotchkiss M1909.
M1915 Colt–Vickers	Heavy machine gun	United States		1917–1945	US variant of the British Vickers machine gun.
M1917 Browning machine gun	Heavy machine gun	United States		1917–1970s	
M1917 Marlin Rockwell	Light machine gun	United States		1917–1920s	Based on the M1895 Colt–Browning.
M1917 Lewis	Light machine gun	United States		1917–1945	US variant of the British Lewis gun.
M1918 Lewis	Light machine gun	United States		1918–1945	Aircraft gun variant of the M1917 Lewis.
M1918 Chauchat	Light machine gun / Automatic rifle	United States		1918	US variant of the French Chauchat.
M1918 Browning Automatic Rifle	Light machine gun / Automatic rifle	United States		1918–1990s	
M1919 Browning machine gun	Medium machine gun	United States		1919–present	
.30 AN/M2	Light machine gun	United States		1930s–1940s	Aircraft mounted variant of M1919
M1941 Johnson machine gun	Light machine gun	United States		1940–1961	
M2 Stinger	Light machine gun	United States		1943–1945	Field modification variant of .30 AN/M2
T24 machine gun	General-purpose machine gun	United States		1944	Copy of the MG 42. Prototype and testing only.

== See also ==
- List of 7.62×51mm NATO firearms
- List of 7.62×54mmR firearms
- List of 7.92×57mm Mauser firearms
- .303 British
- 7.5×54mm
