= M1941 =

M1941 or M1941 Johnson may refer to:

- M1941 Johnson rifle, a semi automatic rifle
- M1941 Johnson machine gun, a light machine gun
- M1941 field jacket, used by U.S. Army soldiers
- Orița M1941 Romanian WW2 submachine gun

== See also ==
- Melvin Johnson
