= List of 7.92×57mm Mauser firearms =

The below table gives a list of firearms that can fire the 7.92×57mm Mauser cartridge. This ammunition was developed from the Patrone 88 and was introduced in 1903. It was adopted by the German Empire in 1905 and was the standard cartridge of German military in both World Wars. This cartridge were also adopted by other countries and one of the world's most popular military cartridges in the 20th century. The 7.92×57mm Mauser is still a popular sport and hunting cartridge in the 21st century.

== List of Weapons ==
=== Rifles ===
Name	Type	Country	Image	Years of service	Notes
FN Model 24 and Model 30	Bolt-action rifle	Belgium		1924–1986	Variant of Gewehr 98.
FN Model 1949	Semi-automatic rifle	Belgium		1949–	Export variant for Egypt.
Mukden Arsenal Mauser	Bolt-action rifle	China; Manchukuo		1924–1950s	
Chiang Kai-shek rifle	Bolt-action rifle	China		1935–1980s	Chinese variant of Mauser Standardmodell.
General Liu rifle	Semi-automatic rifle / bolt-action rifle	China		1916	Prototype and testing only.
vz. 98/22	Bolt-action rifle	Czechoslovakia		1922–2010s	
vz. 24	Bolt-action rifle	Czechoslovakia		1924–1960s	
vz. 33	Bolt-action carbine	Czechoslovakia		1934–1954	
ZH-29	Semi-automatic rifle	Czechoslovakia		1929–1940s	
Hakim Rifle	Semi-automatic rifle	Egypt		1950s–	Variant of Automatgevär m/42.
Gewehr 88/05	Bolt-action rifle	Germany		1905–1945	Rechambered from the original Patrone 88 cartridge.
Gewehr 98	Bolt-action rifle	Germany		1898–1945	
Mauser Model 1904	Bolt-action rifle	Germany		1905–1950s	Export variant.
Karabiner 98AZ	Bolt-action carbine	Germany		1908–1945	Carbine variant of Gewehr 98.
Mauser Model 1889	Bolt-action rifle	Germany		1914–1918	Rechambered from the original 7.65×53mm Mauser.
Mauser Standardmodell	Bolt-action rifle	Germany		1924–1960s	Derived from the Gewehr 98.
Karabiner 98k	Bolt-action rifle	Germany		1935–present	
Gewehr 98/40	Bolt-action rifle	Germany		1940–1945	German-contract 7.92×57mm Mauser variant of 35M rifle.
Volkssturmgewehr 1	Bolt-action rifle	Germany		1945	
Volkssturmgewehr 2	Bolt-action rifle	Germany		1945	
Gewehr 41(M)	Semi-automatic rifle	Germany		1941–1945	
Gewehr 41(W)	Semi-automatic rifle	Germany		1941–1945	
Gewehr 43	Semi-automatic rifle	Germany		1943–1945	
FG 42	Automatic rifle	Germany		1943–1945	
Mannlicher M88/24	Bolt-action rifle	Greece		1924–	Rechambered from the original 8×50mmR Mannlicher.
Mannlicher M95/24	Bolt-action rifle	Greece		1924–	Rechambered from the original 8×50mmR Mannlicher.
43M rifle	Bolt-action rifle	Hungary		1943–1950s	7.92×57mm Mauser variant of 35M rifle.
Karabinek wz. 91/98/23	Bolt-action carbine	Poland		1923–1945	Polish variant of Mosin–Nagant. Rechambered from the original 7.62×54mmR.
Karabinek wz. 1929	Bolt-action rifle	Poland		1930–1945	
Karabinek wz. 98a	Bolt-action rifle	Poland		1936–1945	
Kbsp wz. 1938M	Semi-automatic rifle	Poland		1938–1940s	
Mauser–Vergueiro m/1904-39	Bolt-action rifle	Portugal		1939–1960s	Rechambered from the original 6.5×58mm Vergueiro.
Mauser Model 1890	Bolt-action rifle	Turkey		1930s–1960s	Rechambered from the original 7.65×53mm Mauser.
Mauser Model 1903	Bolt-action rifle	Turkey		1930s–1960s	Rechambered from the original 7.65×53mm Mauser.
Lee–Enfield	Bolt-action rifle	Turkey		1930s–1950s	Rechambered from the original .303 British. Popularly dubbed "Enfauser".
Mannlicher M95M	Bolt-action rifle	Yugoslavia		1924–	Rechambered from the original 8×50mmR Mannlicher.
Zastava M98/48	Bolt-action rifle	Yugoslavia		1946–present	Refurbished captured Karabiner 98k.
Zastava M48	Bolt-action rifle	Yugoslavia		1950–present	Variant of FN Model 24.
Zastava M76	Semi-automatic designated marksman rifle	Yugoslavia		1978–present	

=== Machine Guns ===
Name	Type	Country	Image	Years of service	Notes
Schwarzlose machine gun	Heavy machine gun	Austria-Hungary		1920–1940s	Export variants.
MG 30	Light machine gun	Austria; Switzerland		1930–1940s	
FN Model 1930 and Model D	Light machine gun	Belgium		1930–	Export 7.92×57mm Mauser variant of M1918 Browning Automatic Rifle.
FN Browning Model 1939	Light machine gun	Belgium		1939–1940s	Export 7.92×57mm Mauser variant of M1919 Browning machine gun.
Bren light machine gun	Light machine gun	Canada		1940–1952	Export variant for China, made by John Inglis and Company in Canada.
Type 24 heavy machine gun	Heavy machine gun	China		1935–1950s	Chinese variant of MG 08.
Type 30 heavy machine gun	Heavy machine gun	China		1930s–1950s	Chinese variant of M1917 Browning machine gun.
ZB vz. 26	Light machine gun	Czechoslovakia		1926–present	
vz. 28/L	Light machine gun	Czechoslovakia		1928–1940s	Czechoslovak variant of Lewis gun. Rechambered from the original .303 British.
ZB vz. 30	Light machine gun	Czechoslovakia		1930–2009	
ZB-53	Medium machine gun	Czechoslovakia		1937–1960s	
Madsen machine gun	Light machine gun	Denmark		1907–1970s	Export variants.
Lahti-Saloranta M/26	Light machine gun	Finland		1937–1940s	Export variant for China.
Hotchkiss M1922	Light machine gun	France		1922–1950s	Export variant.
Darne machine gun	Light machine gun	France		1923–	Export variant.
Hotchkiss Mle 1914	Heavy machine gun	France		1920s–1950s	Export variants.
MG 08	Heavy machine gun	Germany		1908–1945	
MG 08/15	Light machine gun	Germany		1915–1945	
Bergmann MG 15nA	Light machine gun	Germany		1916–1945	
MG 08/18	Light machine gun	Germany		1918	
MG 13	Light machine gun	Germany		1930–1940s	
MG 15	Light machine gun	Germany		1933–1945	Flexible aircraft mount variant developed from MG 30.
MG 17	Light machine gun	Germany		1936–1945	Fixed aircraft mount variant developed from MG 30.
MG 34	General-purpose machine gun	Germany		1936–1945	
MG 35/36	Light machine gun	Germany		1936–1945	7.92×57mm Mauser variant of Kulsprutegevär m/40.
MG 42	General-purpose machine gun	Germany		1942–present	
MG 45	General-purpose machine gun	Germany		1944–1945	
MG 81	Light machine gun	Germany		1940–1945	
Zf.Ger.38	Training machine gun	Germany		1938-1945	
Dror light machine gun	Light machine gun	Israel		1947–1952	Pattern 2 variant.
Breda M37	Medium machine gun	Italy		1937–1960s	Export variant.
Army Type 98 Navy Type 1	Aircraft MG; LMG	Japan		1938 – 1945 1941 – 1945	Japanese Army variant of MG 15. Japanese Navy variant of MG 15.
Army Type 100	Aircraft MG; LMG	Japan		1940–1945	
Browning wz. 1928	Light machine gun	Poland		1930–1945	Polish variant of M1918 Browning Automatic Rifle.
Karabin lotniczy uniwersalny wz. 36	Light machine gun	Poland		1936–1946	Fixed aircraft mount variant of Ckm wz. 30.
Karabin maszynowy obserwatora wz.37	Light machine gun	Poland		1937–1949	Flexible aircraft mount variant of Browning wz. 1928.
Ckm wz. 25 Hotchkiss	Heavy machine gun	Poland		1926–1945	Polish variant of Hotchkiss Mle 1914.
Ckm wz. 30	Heavy machine gun	Poland		1931–1970	Polish variant of M1917 Browning machine gun.
Ckm Typ C	Heavy machine gun	Poland		1936–1939	
ALFA M44	Light machine gun	Spain		1944–1950s	
Fusil ametrallador Oviedo	Light machine gun	Spain		1951–1959	Spanish variant of ZB vz. 30.
SIG KE7	Light machine gun	Switzerland		1929–	Export variants.
Besa machine gun	Medium machine gun	United Kingdom		1939–1960s	British variant of ZB-53.
Zastava M53	General-purpose machine gun	Yugoslavia		1953–1999	Yugoslav variant of MG 42.

== See also ==
- List of 7.62×51mm NATO firearms
- List of 7.62×54mmR firearms
- List of .30-06 Springfield firearms
- .303 British
- 7.5×54mm
