= M1947 Johnson auto carbine =

- Type: Semi-automatic rifle
- Place of origin: United States

Production history
- Designer: Melvin Johnson
- Designed: 1947
- No. built: 5

Specifications
- Mass: 8 3/4 lb (4.0 kg)
- Length: 38 in (970 mm)
- Barrel length: 22 in (560 mm)
- Cartridge: .30-06 Springfield
- Action: Short recoil
- Rate of fire: 60 rpm
- Muzzle velocity: 2,800 ft/s (853.6 m/s)
- Feed system: 10 round cylindrical magazine 25-round, single stack-column box magazine

The M1947 Johnson auto carbine is a semi-automatic derivative of the M1941 Johnson machine gun. It was intended as a replacement of the M1 rifle but not accepted. The auto carbine never got past the prototype stage, with only five of them ever being made.

== See also ==
- List of .30-06 Springfield firearms
- M1941 Johnson rifle
- Model 45A
- M1946 Sieg automatic rifle
