= List of 7.62×51mm NATO firearms =

The below table gives a list of firearms that can fire the 7.62×51mm NATO cartridge. This ammunition was developed following World War II as part of the NATO small arms standardization, it is made to replicate the ballistics of a pre-WWII full power rifle cartridge in a more compact package. Not all countries that use weapons chambered in this caliber are in NATO.

This table is sortable for every column.

Name	Type	Country	Image	Years of service	Notes
Steyr SSG 69	Bolt-action sniper rifle	Austria		1969–present	
Steyr Scout	Bolt-action sniper rifle	Austria		1999–present	
Yalguzag sniper rifle	Bolt-action sniper rifle	Azerbaijan		2018–present	
FN Model 30-11	Bolt-action sniper rifle	Belgium		1976–present	Derived from the FN Model 1930.
FN FAL	Battle rifle	Belgium		1953–present	
FN SCAR-H	Battle rifle	Belgium		2009–present	
FN MAG	General-purpose machine gun	Belgium		1958–present	
FN EVOLYS	Light machine gun	Belgium		2021–present	
Madsen machine gun	Light machine gun	Brazil		1950s–present	Rechambered from the original 7×57mm Mauser.
Arsenal MG-M2	General-purpose machine gun	Bulgaria		1990s–present	Variant of the PKM machine gun.
Colt Canada C19	Bolt-action sniper rifle	Canada		2018–present	Licensed copy of the Tikka T3 CTR
C6A1 FLEX	General-purpose machine gun	Canada		2019–present	Improved variant of C6 GPMG.
Steyr M12/61	Bolt-action rifle	Chile		1961–	Rechambered from the original 7×57mm Mauser.
NAR-10	Battle rifle	China		2014	7.62×51mm NATO variant of Type 81 assault rifle.
CS/LR4	Bolt-action sniper rifle	China		2012–present	
CS/LR35	Bolt-action sniper rifle	China		2020–present	
CS/LM4	General-purpose machine gun	China		2008–present	7.62×51mm NATO variant of Type 80 machine gun.
QJY-201	General-purpose machine gun	China		2020–present	
CZ BREN 2	Battle rifle	Czech Republic		2015–present	7.62×51mm NATO variant of the CZ BREN 2.
CZ 750	Bolt-action sniper rifle	Czech Republic		2006–present	
UK vz. 59N	General-purpose machine gun	Czechoslovakia		1967–present	7.62×51mm NATO variant of UK vz. 59.
Madsen-Saetter machine gun	General-purpose machine gun	Denmark		1961–present	
Sako TRG	Bolt-action sniper rifle	Finland		2000–present	TRG-21 and TRG-22 variant.
Tikka T3	Bolt-action rifle	Finland		2006–present	
FA-MAS Type 62	Battle rifle	France		1962	
FR F2	Bolt-action sniper rifle	France		1986-present	
AA-52	General-purpose machine gun	France		1952–present	
Heckler & Koch G3	Battle rifle	Germany		1959–present	
Heckler & Koch HK417	Battle rifle	Germany		2006–present	Derived from the Heckler & Koch HK416.
Heckler & Koch PSG1	Semi-automatic sniper rifle	Germany		1972–present	
Heckler & Koch MSG90	Designated marksman rifle	Germany		1990–present	
Heckler & Koch G28	Designated marksman rifle	Germany		2006–present	Variant of the Heckler & Koch HK417.
SIG Sauer SSG 3000	Bolt-action sniper rifle	Germany		1992–present	
MG 81 machine gun	Light machine gun	Germany		1955	7.62×51mm NATO variant.
MG 3 machine gun	General-purpose machine gun	Germany		1959–present	Derived from the MG 42.
Rheinmetall MG 60	General-purpose machine gun	Germany		1960	Derived from the MG 45.
Heckler & Koch HK21	General-purpose machine gun	Germany		1961–present	
Heckler & Koch MG5	General-purpose machine gun	Germany		2015–present	
Komodo Armament D7 PMR SA	Designated marksman rifle	Indonesia		2014–present	
Pindad SPM-2	Designated marksman rifle	Indonesia		2023–present	Derived from SS2 and SS3.
Pindad SS3	Designated marksman rifle	Indonesia		2016	7.62×51mm variant of Pindad SS2. Prototype design.
Pindad SS79	Battle rifle	Indonesia		1979	7.62×51mm variant of Pindad SS77.
Pindad SP-1 Pindad SP-2 Pindad SP-3	Battle rifle Squad automatic weapon	Indonesia		1968	License-made BM59.
Pindad SPR-1	Bolt-action sniper rifle	Indonesia		2003–present	
Pindad SPR-3	Bolt-action sniper rifle	Indonesia		2010–present	
Komodo Armament D7CH	Bolt-action sniper rifle	Indonesia		2016–present	
Pindad SM-2	General-purpose machine gun	Indonesia		2003–present	Licensed copy of the FN MAG.
Ishapore 2A1 rifle	Bolt-action rifle	India		1963–present	Derived from SMLE Mk III*.
Karabiner 98k	Bolt-action rifle	Israel		1958–1970s	Rechambered from the original 7.92×57mm Mauser.
IMI Galil AR	Battle rifle	Israel		1972–present	7.62×51mm variant of IMI Galil.
IWI Galil ACE 52/53	Battle rifle	Israel		2008–present	7.62×51mm variant of IWI Galil ACE.
IWI Tavor 7	Bullpup battle rifle	Israel		2017	
IMI Galil Galatz	Semi-automatic sniper rifle	Israel		1983–present	
IWI Negev NG-7	General-purpose machine gun	Israel		2012–present	7.62×51mm variant of IWI Negev.
Beretta BM 59	Battle rifle	Italy		1959–present	Derived from M1 Garand.
Beretta MG 42/59	General-purpose machine gun	Italy		1959–present	Licensed copy of the MG 3 machine gun.
Howa Type 64	Battle rifle	Japan		1964–present	
Sumitomo Type 62	General-purpose machine gun	Japan		1962–present	
M+G project	Squad automatic weapon	Netherlands		1962	
Kongsberg M59	Bolt-action sniper rifle	Norway		1959–present	Derived from the Karabiner 98k.
MG34F2	General-purpose machine gun	Norway		1976–1994	Rechambered from the .30-06 Springfield.
PSR-90	Semi-automatic sniper rifle	Pakistan			Derived from the HK PSG1.
Azb DMR MK1	Designated marksman rifle	Pakistan		2014–present	
Bor rifle	Bolt-action sniper rifle	Poland		2007–present	
UKM-2000	General-purpose machine gun	Poland		2000–present	
AK-308	Battle rifle	Russia		2018–present	
SV-98	Bolt-action sniper rifle	Russia		2003	Export variant.
Browning MG4	General-purpose machine gun	South Africa		1976–present	Variant of the M1919 Browning.
Vektor SS-77	General-purpose machine gun	South Africa		1986–present	
Denel DMG-5	General-purpose machine gun	South Africa		2016	
S&T Motiv K16	General-purpose machine gun	South Korea		2012–present	
S&T Motiv STSR23	Designated marksman rifle	South Korea		2024–present	
S&T Motiv K14	Bolt-action sniper rifle	South Korea		2012–present	
FR8	Bolt-action rifle	Spain		1950s–1970s	
CETME Model 58	Battle rifle	Spain		1961–1992	
ALFA M55	Medium machine gun	Spain		1955–	7.62×51mm variant of ALFA M44.
FAO Model 59	Light machine gun	Spain		1959–	7.62×51mm variant of Fusil ametrallador Oviedo.
Automatkarbin 4	Battle rifle	Sweden		1964–present	Licensed copy of the HK G3A3.
Ksp 58 machine gun	General-purpose machine gun	Sweden		1958–present	Licensed copy of the FN MAG.
Kulspruta m/39	General-purpose machine gun	Sweden		1975–present	Licensed copy of the M1919A4.
Kulspruta m/42	General-purpose machine gun	Sweden		1975–present	Derived from the M1919A6.
Direx Universal Gun	Battle rifle	Switzerland			1956
SIG SG 510	Battle rifle	Switzerland		1957–present	Export variants.
SIG MG 710-3	General-purpose machine gun	Switzerland		1960s–present	
T93 sniper rifle	Bolt-action sniper rifle	Taiwan		2003–present	
Zbroyar Z-10	Designated marksman rifle	Ukraine	800 × 583 pixelspx	2012-present	
L1A1 Self-Loading Rifle	Semi-automatic rifle	United Kingdom		1954–present	Derived from the FN FAL.
L129A1	Designated marksman rifle	United Kingdom	800 × 583 pixelspx	2009-present	
L42A1	Bolt-action sniper rifle	United Kingdom		1970–1990	Variant of the Rifle No. 4 Mk I (T).
Parker-Hale M85	Bolt-action sniper rifle	United Kingdom		1980s–present	
Accuracy International Arctic Warfare	Bolt-action sniper rifle	United Kingdom		1990–present	
L4 machine gun	Light machine gun	United Kingdom		1950s–1990s	
L7 Machine Gun	General-purpose machine gun	United Kingdom		1954–present	Derived from the FN MAG.
L94A1 chain gun	Chain gun	United Kingdom		1980–present	
M14 rifle	Battle rifle	United States		1957–present	
Mk 14 Enhanced Battle Rifle	Battle rifle Designated marksman rifle	United States		2002–present	
ArmaLite AR-10	Battle rifle	United States		1958–1985	
M1 Garand	Semi-automatic rifle	United States		1965–1990s	Mk 2 Mod 0 and Mk 2 Mod 1 variants were converted to 7.62 NATO for US Navy.
SR-25	Designated marksman rifle	United States		1990–present	
M40 rifle	Bolt-action sniper rifle	United States		1966–present	Military variant of Remington 700.
M24 Sniper Weapon System	Bolt-action sniper rifle	United States		1988–present	Military and police variant of Remington 700.
Remington MSR	Bolt-action sniper rifle	United States		2009–present	
M60 machine gun	General-purpose machine gun	United States		1957–present	
M73 machine gun	Medium machine gun	United States		1959–present	
M134 Minigun	Rotary machine gun	United States		1963–present	
Mk 21 Mod 0 machine gun	Medium machine gun	United States		1966–1973	Rechambered from the original .30-06 Springfield.
M240 machine gun	General-purpose machine gun	United States		1977–present	Derived from the FN MAG.
Mk 48 machine gun	General-purpose machine gun	United States		2003–present	Derived from the Mk 46 Mod 0.
Zastava M77 B1	Battle rifle	Yugoslavia		1977–present	
Zastava M77	Light machine gun	Yugoslavia		1977–present	

== See also ==
- List of 5.56×45mm NATO firearms
- List of 7.92×57mm Mauser firearms
- List of 7.62×54mmR firearms
- List of .30-06 Springfield firearms
- .303 British
- 7.5×54mm
