= Yisrael Galili (inventor) =

Israeli firearm designer

- יִשְׂרָאֵל גְּלִילִי
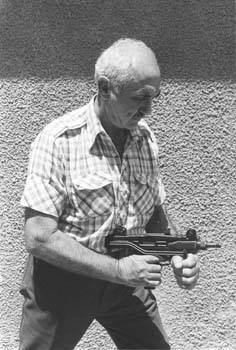
- Galili holding a Mini Uzi, 1981
- Born: Yisrael Balashnikov (ישראל בלשניקוב); 1923; Mishmar HaYarden, Mandatory Palestine
- Died: 9 March 1995 (aged 71–72); Givatayim, Israel
- Occupation: Weapons designer

Yisrael Galili (Hebrew: יִשְׂרָאֵל גְּלִילִי; born Yisrael Balashnikov; Russian: Исраэль Балашников; 1923 – 9 March 1995) was an Israeli weapons designer, best known for designing the Galil assault rifle. He also helped to create the Uzi submachine gun.

== Early life ==
Galili was born Yisrael Balashnikov in Mishmar HaYarden, a moshava in the Upper Galilee in Mandatory Palestine, to Russian Jewish parents, though it is sometimes misreported that "Mishmar Hayarden" was either his birth name or located in the Soviet Union and that he immigrated from there as a child. His birth surname is often compared to Mikhail Kalashnikov, inventor of the AK-47, though they are not related. He kept the last name Balashnikov for most of his adult life, with his assault rifle design initially also being referred to as the Balashnikov, until the Israel Defense Forces adopted the firearm into its arsenal in 1972. He subsequently changed his name to Galili, after the Galilee region where he grew up in, terming the rifle the Galil. He was still commonly credited as "Yisrael Galili (Balashnikov)".

== Career ==
Early in his life, Galili joined the Haganah. At 14, he was assigned to guard duties for a Jewish battalion of the British Army, where he stole his first rifle, albeit without ammunition, which he used to defend his family during the 1936–1939 Arab revolt. He entered the Max Fein Vocational School in Jaffa at age 16 and learnt to assemble weapons. During World War II he enlisted in the British Army and served in the Jewish Brigade, stealing firearms from the military during this time to acquire weapons for the Haganah. While with the Haganah, he oversaw the creation of the Dror light machine gun from cheaply bought parts of the M1941 Johnson machine gun. During the 1948 Arab–Israeli War, several of Galili's family members were taken prisoner by the Syrian Army.

In 1948, Galili joined Israel Military Industries, in a position he continuously maintained for 44 years. During the Six-Day War in 1967, the Israel Defense Forces (IDF) captured many AK-47 assault rifles from the Egyptian Army which proved more reliable and useful in the arid conditions against the FN FAL. Inspired by the AK-platform, the IDF assessed it thoroughly and began the process of designing a new automatic rifle. The task was assigned to two groups: one led by Uziel Gal, the designer of the Uzi submachine gun, and the other led by Galili. Galili sought to convert the ammunition type for the rifles to 5.56mm NATO. Using rifle barrels and magazines from the Stoner 63 provided by Gal, he and Yakov Lior produced the first prototypes to be tested by the Golani Brigade. The Galil assault rifle heavily derives most of the features from Kalashnikov AK-47.

Galili drew additional inspiration from the Finnish RK 62 and used its receivers for the Galil's first prototypes (itself an improved version of Polish AK-47s), Galili, together with Yakov Lior, invented what later became the Galil assault rifle, named after its inventor. Tests were conducted from the end of the 1960s to the early 1970s, where Galili's rifle was compared to the AK-47, Stoner 63, M16, HK33, AR-18, Steyr AUG, AR70, and the experimental GAL 5.56mm. Galili's rifle emerged as the winner and as a result the Galil was adopted by the military. In 1973, Galili and Lior received the Israel Defense Prize for this achievement. Afterwards, Israel also sold the rifle to Nicaragua under Anastasio Somoza Debayle, who personally met with Galili in 1975.

== Personal life ==
Galili's son Zeev, who was trained to be a gunsmith by his father at 17, recalled that his father was emotionally distant. Zeev was critical of his willingness to provide arms to corrupt nations, which Galili justified as "a way to strengthen the state". Despite this, Galili held the view that "the quality of [Israeli] politicians deteriorated" after the founder David Ben-Gurion, but became a close friend to former Chief of Staff Rafael Eitan through their business relationship. Galili was also a fan of American actor Chuck Norris, who used the Galil rifle in several of his films, and eventually met with him in the 1980s.

=== Death ===
Galili died of a heart attack on 9 March 1995, aged 72, at his home in Givatayim, outside of Tel Aviv. He had reportedly been waiting for a physical examination when he died after collapsing in line. The family received personal condolences by Prime Ministers Yitzhak Rabin and Shimon Peres.

== Gun collection and son ==
After his death, Galili's extensive personal collection of firearms was given to his son Zeev, who donated most of them to the Israel Defense Forces History Museum and kept the remainder, 38 revolvers, 12 rifles, 46 magazines, and thousands of individual bullets, on a wall display in the living room of the family home in Hod HaSharon.

Zeev Galili joined the Israeli Ground Forces, initially as a driver before his father arranged for his transfer to weapons development, where he served for 40 years. In 1998, Zeev Galili was arrested after his workplace, a weapons store, was linked to the sales of firearms and ammunition to undercover Hezbollah agent Quais Obeid, but released after two days of questioning at an underground Shin Bet facility.

On 25 July 2011, Kfar Sava police confiscated the gun collection from Zeev Galili, who had been required to turn in all his weapons due to a criminal complaint following a domestic dispute at his home and voluntarily shown officers additional firearms he kept at his parents' house. Police were unaware of his father's identity and mistakenly believed Zeev Galili to be an arms trafficker. Zeev Galili was remanded for five days and questioned for nine hours about two of the guns, an engraved Nazi-era Mauser and a still-functional prototype Jericho, as well as a razor whetstone, which police claimed was a bomb detonator. The initial domestic complaint was dismissed as unfounded, but the weapons were kept for ballistic testing. Zeev Galili later complained that the officers had deprived him of food, causing him severe pain as a diabetic, with his attorney Michael Ofir adding that the police made sensationalist comments immediately after the seizure of the guns. Zeev Galili put a great emphasis on having the collection returned without damage, saying "It is the only memento I have of him. Some parents leave poems and love letters behind. My father left me a collection of weapons.".
