= M1941 Johnson machine gun =

Johnson M1941 LMG
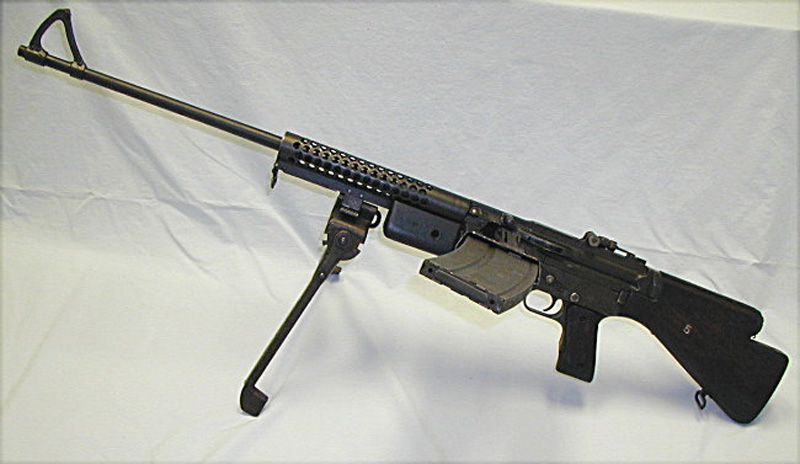
- Type: Light machine gun
- Place of origin: United States

Service history
- In service: 1940–1961
- Used by: See Users
- Wars: World War II; Korean War; Hukbalahap Rebellion; Cuban Revolution

Production history
- Designed: 1940
- Unit cost: USD $265 (1941; equivalent to $5,801 in 2025)
- Produced: 1940–1945
- No. built: 9,500
- Variants: M1941; M1944; T48

Specifications
- Mass: 13 lb (5.9 kg)
- Length: 42 in (1,100 mm)
- Barrel length: 22 in (560 mm)
- Cartridge: .30-06 Springfield
- Action: Short recoil
- Rate of fire: M1944e1: 600-700rpm M1941:450-600rpm
- Muzzle velocity: 2,800 ft/s (850 m/s)
- Effective firing range: 600 m (660 yd)
- Feed system: 20-round, single stack-column detachable box magazine

The M1941 Johnson Light Machine Gun, also known as the Johnson and the Johnny gun, was an American recoil-operated light machine gun designed by Melvin Johnson in the late 1930s. It shared the same operating principle and many parts with his M1941 Johnson rifle and M1947 Johnson auto carbine.

== Design ==
The M1941 Johnson light machine gun was designed by a Boston lawyer and captain in the Marine Corps Reserve, Melvin Johnson Jr. His goal was to build a semi-automatic rifle that would outperform the M1 Garand the US Army had adopted. By late 1937, he had designed, built, and successfully tested both a semi-automatic rifle and a prototype light machine gun. Each shared a significant number of physical characteristics and common parts, and both operated on the principle of short recoil with a multi-lug rotating bolt (first used on the Fosbery Pump Shotgun). He took the parts of other guns, switching them out and creating the M1941 light machine gun.

Johnson's curved, single-column magazine attached to the left side of the receiver; company brochures list a 20-round magazine as standard. Additionally, the weapon could be loaded by stripper clip at the ejection port, or by single rounds fed into the breech. The rate of fire was adjustable, from 200 to 600 rounds per minute. Two versions were built: the M1941 with a wooden stock and a metal bipod, and the M1944 with a tubular steel butt and a wooden monopod.

The design intended the recoil forces to travel, along with the mass of the weapon's moving parts, in a direct line to the shoulder of the gunner. While this design minimized muzzle climb, the sights had to be placed higher above the bore.

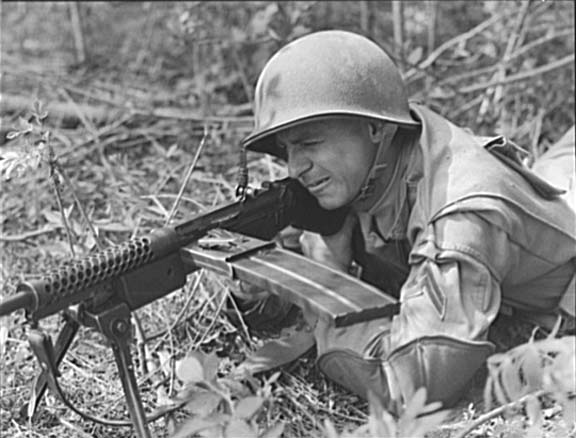
A USMC paramarine Corporal firing a M1941 Johnson light machine gun in 1943

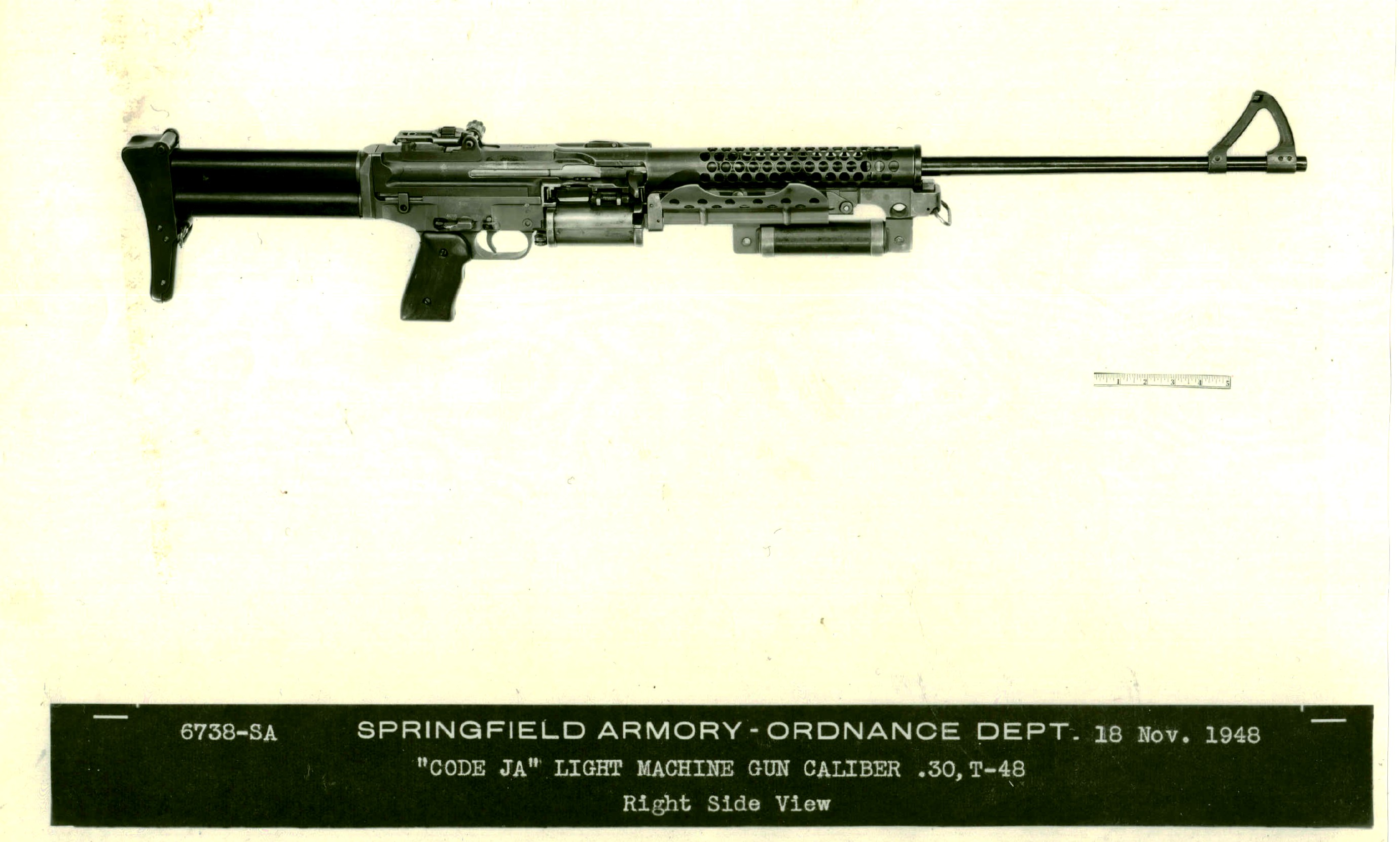
Johnson T48 light machine gun

The weapon has many parallels with the German FG 42 automatic rifle. Both feed from the left side, and both fire from an open bolt while in automatic, and a closed bolt while in semi-auto. Both weapons were awkward to carry loaded, with a side-mounted magazine; the Johnson had an especially lengthy single-column magazine, and this feature tended to unbalance the weapon. Despite these similarities, there is no evidence that either weapon had any effect on the design of the other. Both weapons attempted to solve similar problems, and adopted similar solutions.

Prototypes of semi-automatic rifles, 20-round magazine-fed, based on the Johnson LMG were also produced. The M1947 Johnson auto carbine is an example. A belt fed variant, the T48 light machine gun also existed.

== Deployment ==
Johnson sold small quantities of the Johnson LMG to the U.S. Army and Marine Corps.

During World War II, Allied special forces demanded a more portable, lighter, more accurate automatic rifle that provided the equivalent stopping power of the American BAR. As a result, this machine gun was adapted as the BAR replacement for commandos operating behind Axis lines. The First Special Service Force commandos, raised jointly with men from both Canada and the United States (the famous Devil's Brigade), traded the Marine Corps plastic explosives for 125 of the new Johnson light machine guns. They were used in lieu of BARs, but as they wore out and were lost in combat they were replaced by BARs.

The Johnson LMG was used by the Philippine Army and Philippine Constabulary during World War II under the Japanese Military Occupation from 1942 to 1945 and post-war from 1945 to 1960s including during the Hukbalahap Rebellion (1946–1954) and by the Philippine Expeditionary Forces to Korea (PEFTOK) from 1950–1955.

Shortly after the 1948 Arab–Israeli War, the predecessor of the Israel Defense Forces, Haganah, developed a close copy of the Johnson, the Dror, in both .303 British and 7.92×57mm Mauser. Israeli forces found the Dror unreliable as it was prone to jam from sand and dust ingress, and the weapon was discontinued after a brief period of service. Ernesto "Che" Guevara notably used a Johnson in the Cuban Revolution.

== Aftermath ==
Melvin Johnson continued to develop small arms. In 1955, he was asked to assist Fairchild/ArmaLite in (unsuccessfully) promoting Eugene Stoner's AR-10 rifle with the U.S. Department of Defense, then with ArmaLite and Colt's Manufacturing Company as an advocate for the AR-15. Armalite relied heavily on Johnson's efforts and the AR-15 used a similar bolt design to the M1941 Johnson. One of Johnson's last postwar firearms ventures was a 5.7 mm-caliber version of the M1 carbine, a.k.a. 'the Spitfire'.

=== Liquid propellant prototype ===
A prototype using hydrazine for a caseless firearm was also developed. The firearms would have been very effective and pretty equivalent in performance to conventional propellants, while offering improved supply lines. The main concern was in the durability of pressure seals in field conditions as well as toxicity of the substance to the user.

== Users ==
- Canada: Known to be used by Canadian soldiers in the Special Service Force
- Malaysia: Formerly used by the Royal Malaysian Police, now on display at the Police Museum.
- Philippines
- United Kingdom
- United States

=== Non-state actors ===
- 26th of July Movement

== See also ==
- Sturmgewehr 52
- Kg m/40 automatic rifle
- FG 42
- Furrer M25
- List of individual weapons of the U.S. Armed Forces
- M60 machine gun
- Model 45A
- Sieg automatic rifle
- MG 30
- Dror
- TRW Low Maintenance Rifle
