= M1941 Johnson rifle =

Johnson M1941
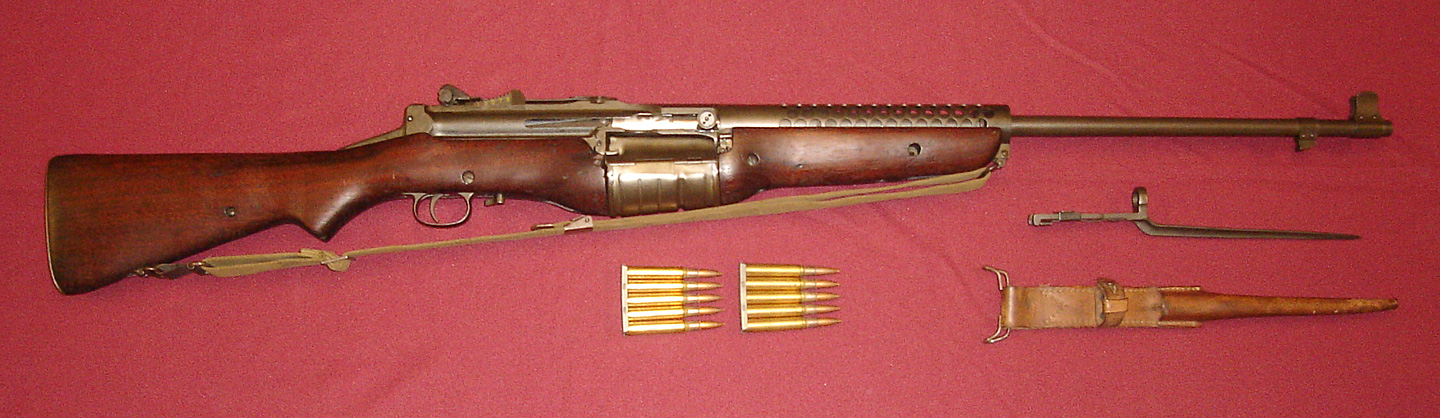
- Johnson M1941 Semi-Automatic Rifle with original spike bayonet and leather sheath. The 10-round rotary magazine could be quickly reloaded using two clips of .30 Caliber M2 Ball ammunition.
- Type: Semi-automatic rifle
- Place of origin: United States

Service history
- In service: 1941–1945; 1941–1961 (worldwide)
- Used by: See Users
- Wars: World War II; Indonesian National Revolution; Chinese Civil War; Bay of Pigs Invasion

Production history
- Designer: Melvin Johnson
- Designed: 1939
- Manufacturer: Johnson Automatics Inc
- Produced: 1940–1945
- No. built: ~21,988 cost per unit $125
- Variants: VF-1 (Argentine copy)

Specifications
- Mass: 9.5 lb (4.31 kg)
- Length: 45.87 in (1,165 mm)
- Barrel length: 22 in (560 mm)
- Cartridge: .30-06 Springfield; 7×57mm Mauser (Chilean variant) .270 Winchester
- Action: Short-recoil, rotating bolt
- Muzzle velocity: 2,840 ft/s (866 m/s)
- Feed system: 10 round rotary magazine
- Sights: Adjustable Iron Sights

The M1941 Johnson Rifle is an American short-recoil operated semi-automatic rifle designed by Melvin Johnson prior to World War II. The M1941 unsuccessfully competed with the contemporary M1 Garand rifle but was used in limited numbers by the US Marines during the Second World War.

== Design ==
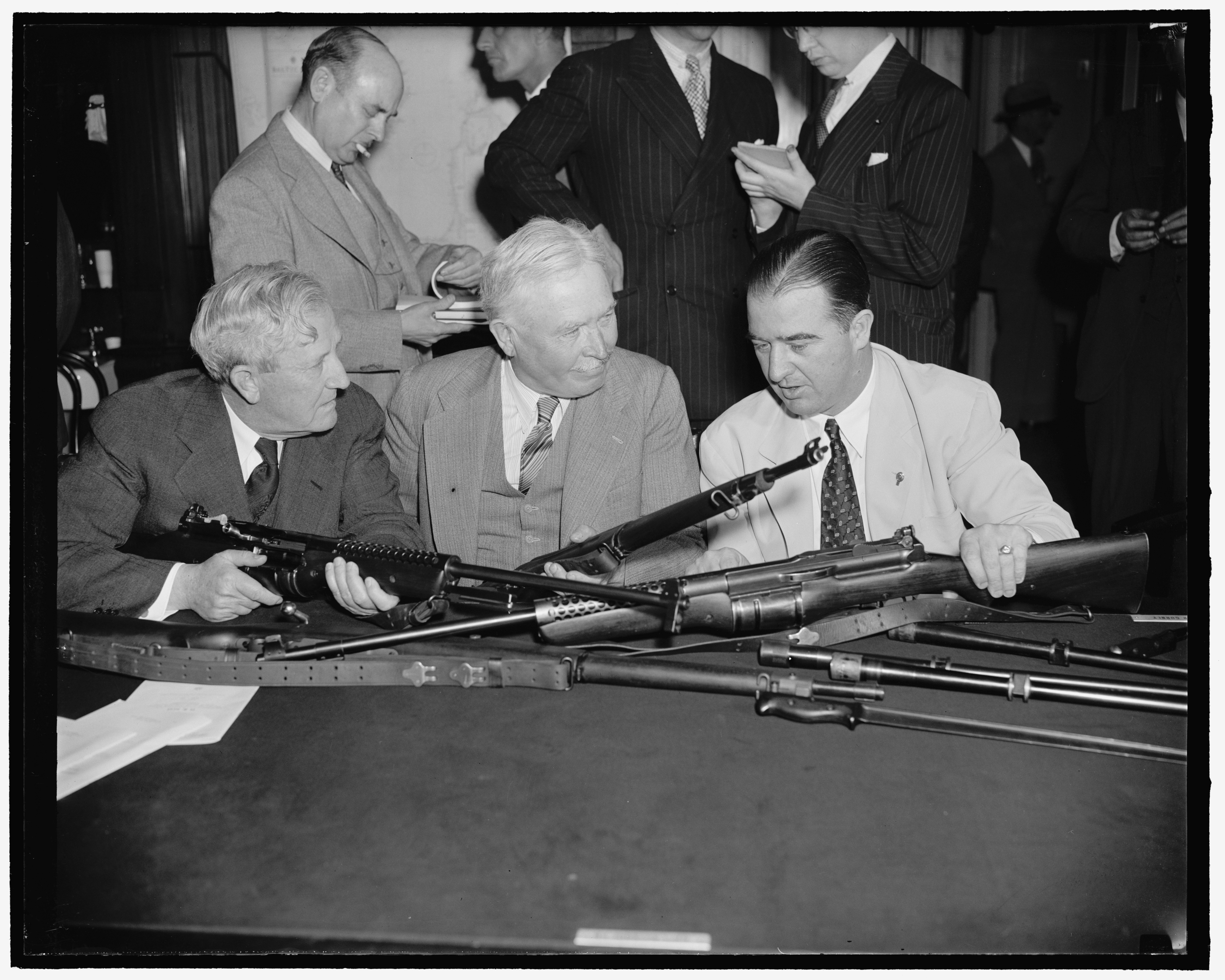
Senator Sheppard, left, Chairman of the Senate Military Affairs Committee, Maj. Gen. George A. Lynch, U.S. Chief of Infantry, and Senator A. B. Chandler of Kentucky, inspect the M1941 semi-automatic rifle which competed unsuccessfully against the M1 Garand to become the Army's standard weapon

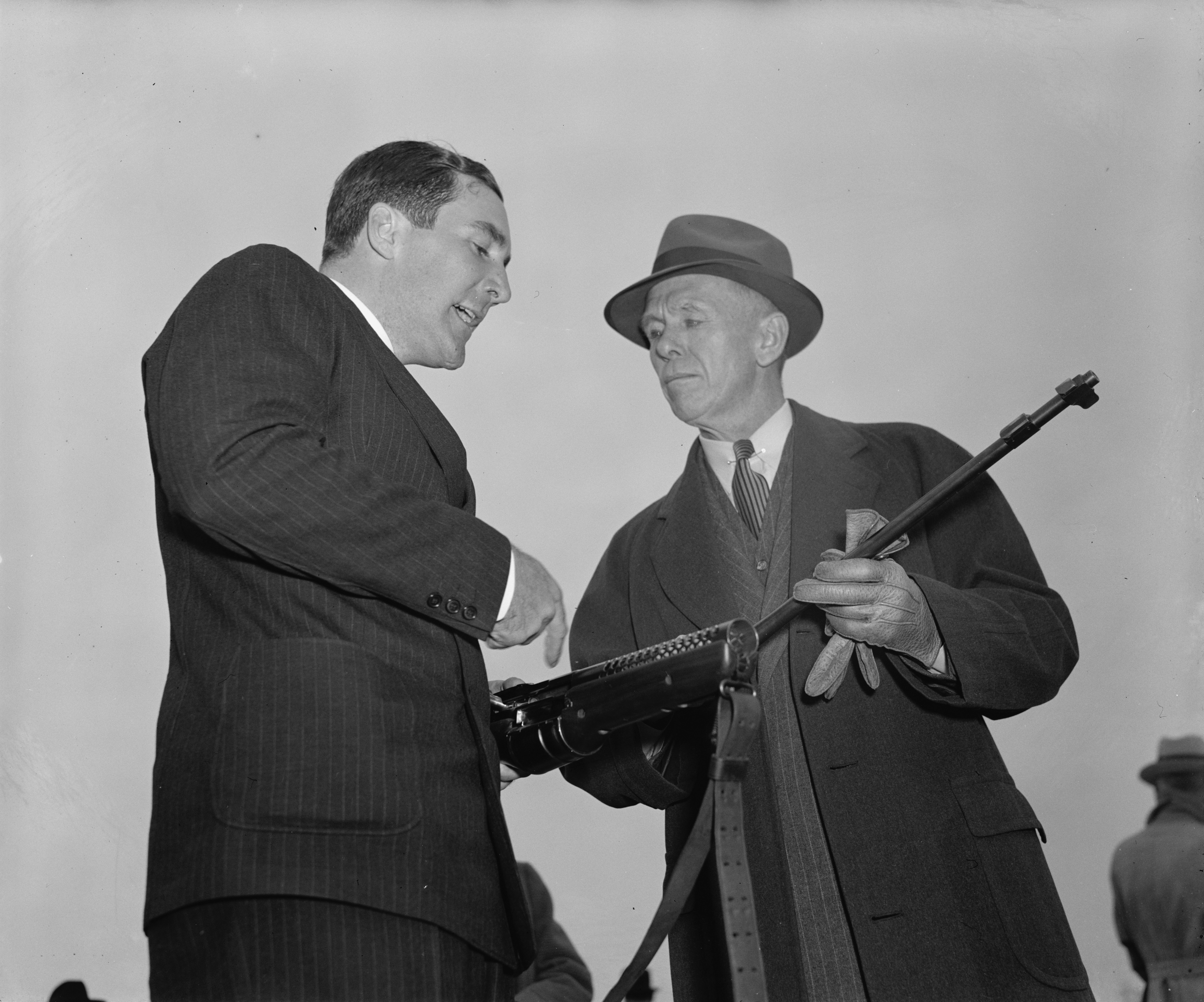
Melvin Johnson and Gen. George Marshall with a disassembled M1941 rifle

The M1941 rifle used the energy from recoil to cycle the rifle. As the bullet and propellant gases moved down the barrel, they imparted force on the bolt head which was locked to the barrel. The barrel, together with the bolt, moved a short distance rearward until the bullet left the barrel and pressure in the bore dropped to safe levels. The barrel then stopped against a shoulder allowing the bolt carrier to continue rearward under the momentum imparted by the initial recoil stage. The multi-lug rotating bolt (first used on the Fosbery Pump Shotgun), with eight locking lugs, would then unlock from the chamber as cam arrangement rotated and unlocked the bolt to continue the operating cycle. The Johnson rifle utilized a two-piece stock and a unique 10-round rotary magazine, designed to use the same 5-round stripper clips already in use by the M1903 Rifle. Another advantage of this loading method is that the magazine can be topped up while there is still a round in the chamber and the rifle is ready to fire.

This system had some advantages in comparison to the M1 Garand rifle, such as a greater magazine capacity combined with the ability to recharge the magazine with ammunition (using 5-round clips or individually) at any time, even with the bolt closed on a chambered round. Also, the Johnson rifle did not — unlike the M1 Rifle — eject an en bloc clip upon firing the last round in the magazine, which was considered an advantage by some soldiers.

A widely held belief among US soldiers (when surveyed in 1952, 27% of soldiers held this opinion) was that the M1 Garand's distinctive clip ejection sound, the well-known "M1 ping", presented a danger when fighting an enemy force, as the sound could signal that the soldier's M1 rifle was empty. Regardless of any anecdotal beliefs, and despite the popularity of the story, there are no verified cases of an enemy using the "M1 ping" sound to their advantage up through the Korean War.

Despite the several advantages the Johnson Rifle design had over the M1 Garand rifle, the existing disadvantages were too great to change US rifle production from the M1 Garand. The Johnson's short recoil reciprocating barrel mechanism resulted in excessive vertical shot dispersion that was never fully cured during its production life. It was also prone to malfunction when a bayonet was attached to the reciprocating barrel (short recoil weapons require specific barrel weights to cycle correctly). Additionally, the complex movements of the barrel required for proper operation would be subject to unacceptable stress upon a bayonet thrust into a target. The Johnson also employed a number of small parts that were easily lost during field stripping. Partially because of lack of development, the M1941 was less rugged and reliable than the M1, though this was a matter of personal preference and was not universally opined among those that had used both weapons in combat.

As was Johnson's practice, he gave all of his weapons a "pet" nickname. Johnson christened his semi-automatic rifle Betsy and the Light Machine Gun Emma.

Melvin Johnson continued to develop small arms. He worked with ArmaLite and Colt's Manufacturing Company as an advocate for the AR-15. The AR-15 used a bolt design similar to the M1941 Johnson, though the AR-15 employs a "direct impingement" gas operated action. This design eliminates the operating rod (used in such arms as the M1 Garand, M14, and AK47), making the rifle lighter and reliable.

== History ==
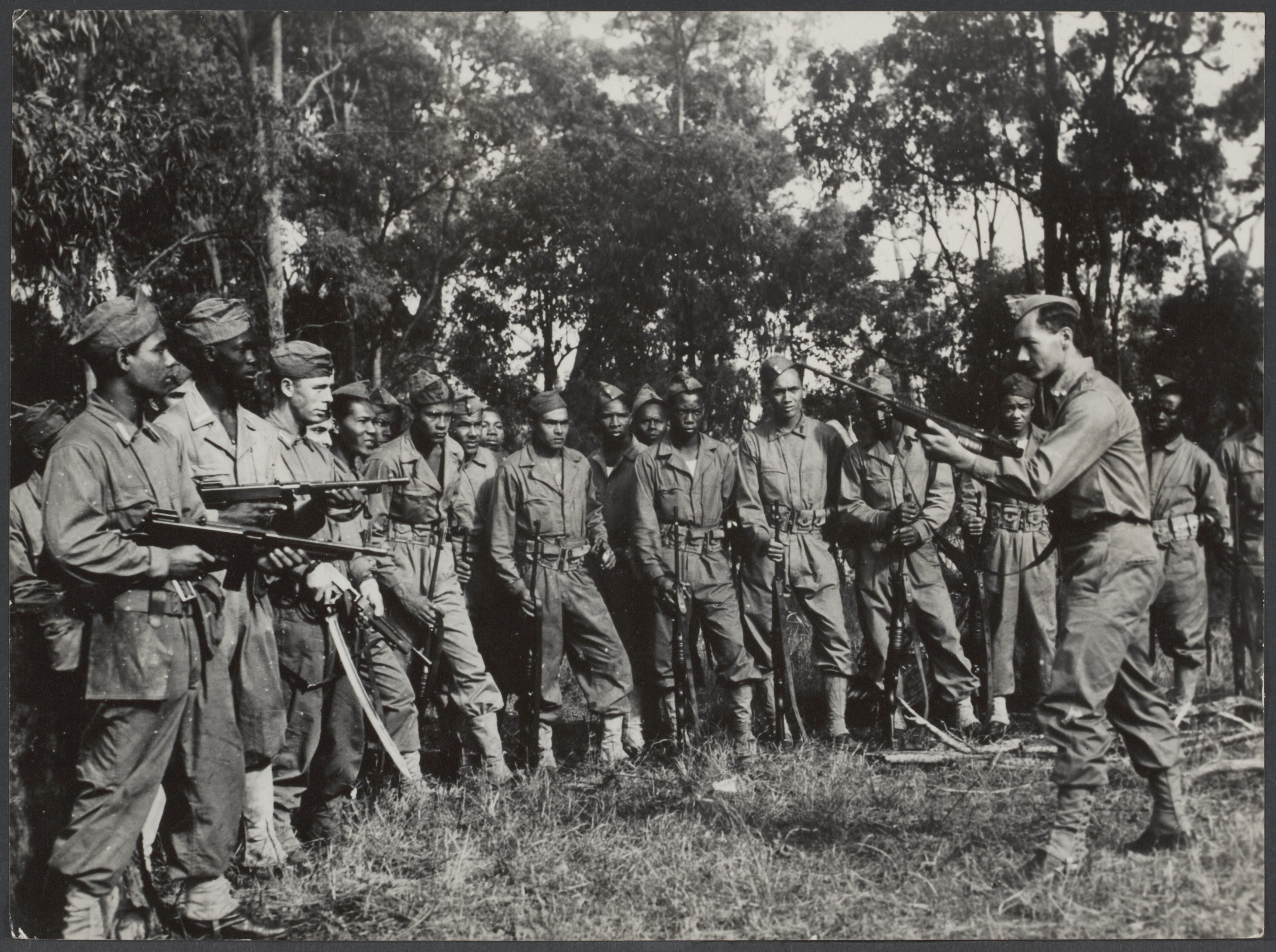
Soldiers of the Royal Netherlands East Indies Army in July 1945. The soldier on the right carries a Johnson rifle.

In mid-1930s, the U.S. Army was looking for a semi-automatic rifle, and John Garand from the Springfield Armory won the tender with his candidate. Melvin Johnson, a lawyer by profession, a Marine officer and a gun hobbyist, was skeptical of the adopted design (for example, he doubted that wartime ammunition would be consistent enough for a gas-operated rifle to work reliably) and decided to develop his own. In February 1936, when the Garand had just been adopted, he had his first working model, which had an unprecedented 10 locking lugs in its rotating bolt, manufactured in a machine shop for $300. In April, Johnson filed for a patent, and in August the first complete prototype rifle was completed. He continued the development during 1937-1938 while Garand's already adopted design was being tweaked and maturing. In 1938-40, the early prototype model R-14 rifle had support to mount a sword bayonet such as the M1905 bayonet pattern, despite a failed US Army trial.

Melvin Johnson campaigned heavily for the adoption of his rifle by the U.S. Army and other service branches. However, after limited testing, the Army rejected Johnson's rifle in favor of the M1 rifle they already had. The M1941 was ordered by the Netherlands for issue to the KNIL in the Dutch East Indies, but only 1,999 rifles were shipped to the Dutch East Indies before the Japanese invaded. At this time, the U.S. Marine Corps found itself in need of a modern fast-firing infantry rifle, and acquired some rifles from the Dutch East Indies shipment for issue to its Paramarine battalions then preparing to deploy for action in the Pacific theater. By all accounts, the M1941 performed acceptably in combat with the Marines in the early days of the Pacific fighting.

Weapon serial number A0009 was issued to USMC Captain Robert Hugo Dunlap, of Monmouth, Illinois, and he carried it into combat in the battle for Iwo Jima, beginning 19 February 1945. Captain Dunlap was awarded the Medal of Honor for his actions in that battle, and he retained and displayed the weapon until his death in 2000. He praised the rifle and credited it with saving his life and the lives of others.

Despite repeated requests by the Marine Corps to adopt the rifle, the Johnson rifle lacked the support of US Army Ordnance, which had already invested considerable sums in the development of the M1 Garand and its revised gas operating system, then just going into full production. Johnson was successful in selling small quantities of the M1941 Johnson Light Machine Gun to the U.S. armed forces, and this weapon was later used by both Paramarines and the Army's First Special Service Force.

Besides Netherlands, Norway received samples in 1939 (but there was no order due to subsequent German invasion), and in the early 1940s the Chilean military ordered 1,000 rifles in 7x57 (the difference in caliber necessitated procuring barrels from Mexico), which were delivered in 1943. Serial numbers are all 4 digit with the 2nd block having an A prefix and the 3rd having a B. Not all numbers were produced which means total production was under 30,000 including all Light Machine Gun models. Some sources claim 70,000, but this is impossible based on the actual serial number range.

Additionally, in April 1944, the United States War Department offered the Free French military the use of approximately 10,500 Johnson rifles and 1,500 Johnson light machine guns; these guns were from undelivered Dutch/Netherlands contracts taken over by the United States Government in 1942. The French requested them for issue to their "Sovereignty troops" (i.e. second line units remaining in North Africa), but this order was not followed through.

Some rifles were reportedly sent to Nationalist China, and a few were captured by the People's Liberation Army during the later stages of the Chinese Civil War. The .30-06 Springfield and Enfield M1917 rifles were supplied in large numbers to the KMT by the USA pre-1945, to arm Y and X Forces in Burma. About 30% of Nationalist small arms were of US origin, 30% captured Japanese, and the remainder from various Chinese sources. One US military source states that between September and November 1948 the Nationalists lost 230,000 rifles to the Communists. In early 1949 the total figure reached over 400,000 of which at least 100,000 were US types.

At the beginning of the Indonesian National Revolution, some M1941 rifles were still in service within Dutch forces. While the KNIL handed over many Geweer M. 95 and Lee-Enfield rifles to Indonesia after the end of the war, the Johnson rifles were brought to the Netherlands. They were eventually sold in the surplus market in 1953.

In late 1946, Argentina expressed an interest in Johnson's arms, and Johnson fabricated a prototype, the Model 1947 auto carbine, a semi automatic rifle variant of the light machine gun with the 10 round cylindrical magazine. While specific details are sketchy, it apparently bore little resemblance, but shared some features with the Johnson M1941 light machine gun. Argentina apparently declined to purchase any, and the M1947 auto carbine never went into production. In any event, the post-war years were not kind to the Johnson organisation. The entity filed for bankruptcy and was liquidated in early 1949.

A notable example is the FMA VF-1 manufactured in Argentina.

The Johnson rifle was also used in training by the anti-Castro Brigade 2506 and carried to the 1961 Bay of Pigs invasion as evidenced by a photo with Castro.

== Users ==
=== State users ===
- Chile
- Taiwan
- Cuba
- Netherlands
  - Dutch East Indies (KNIL)
- Philippines
- United States

=== Non-state users ===
- Brigade 2506 Troops were issued the rifle with clandestine ammo chests of .30-06 ammo with special coded headstamps.

== See also ==
- List of clip-fed firearms
- Mannlicher 1885 semi-automatic rifle
- Stendebach Model 1936 rifle, German semi-automatic prototype
- Pedersen rifle
- Automatgevär m/42
- Thompson Autorifle
- M1947 Johnson auto carbine
