= SIG MG 50 =

- Type: General-purpose machine gun
- Place of origin: Switzerland

Service history
- Used by: Denmark

Specifications
- Length: 1245 mm
- Barrel length: 600 mm
- Action: gas operated
- Feed system: belt

The SIG MG 50 is a general-purpose machine gun of Swiss origin and was chambered in many calibres. It was designed to replace the Maxim and Furrer M25 guns in service of pre-World War II design so around 1944/51, SIG industries decided to manufacture a series of gas-operated machine guns fed by using drum magazines and ammo belts. The MG 50 lost in the trials to the MG 51; however, it continued sales for a time. A version chambered in the .30-06 calibre was adopted by Denmark as the SIG M/51, while another variant was tested in Sweden as the SIG MG 53 but again was turned down.

== Overview ==
The MG 50 is an air-cooled, gas-operated weapon and is fed by ammo belt. The barrel is designed to be interchanged quickly when in field conditions.

== See also ==
- List of .30-06 Springfield firearms
