= Kulsprutegevär m/40 =

Kulsprutegevär m/1940
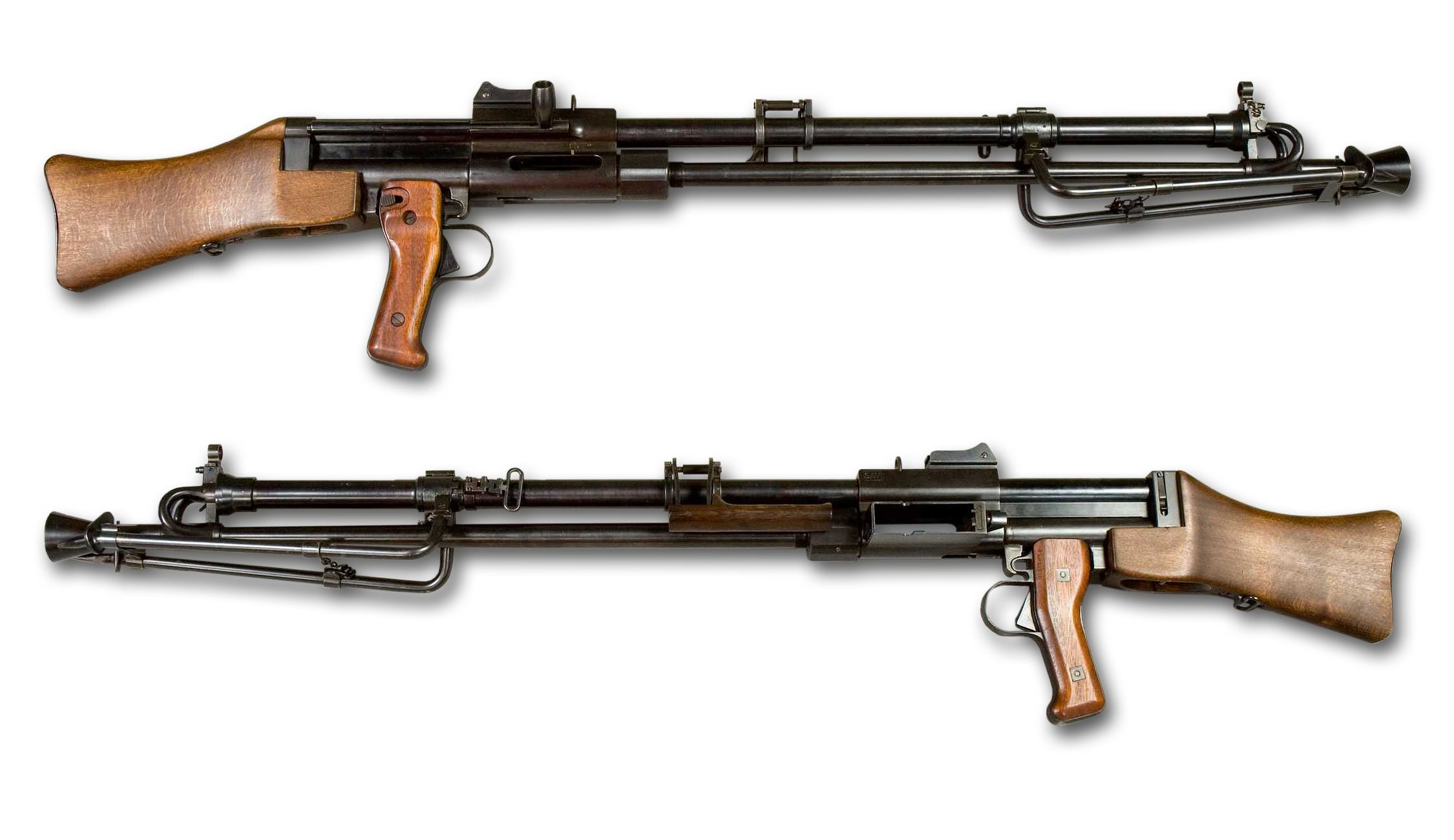
- Type: Automatic rifle
- Place of origin: Sweden

Service history
- Used by: See § Users
- Wars: World War II

Production history
- Designer: Hans Lauf; Ivar Staeck; Torsten Lindfors
- Designed: 1933
- Manufacturer: Knorr-Bremse AG
- Produced: 1935–1936
- No. built: 5,406
- Variants: MG 35/36A (German)

Specifications
- Mass: 8.5 kg (18.7 lb) (Kg m/40); 10 kg (22.0 lb) (MG-35/36)
- Length: 1,257 mm (49.5 in) (Kg m/40); 1,280 mm (50 in) (MG-35/36)
- Barrel length: 685 mm (27.0 in) (Kg m/40); 500 mm (20 in) (MG-35/36)
- Cartridge: 6.5×55mm Swedish (Kg m/40); 7.92×57mm Mauser (MG-35/36)
- Action: Long-stroke piston, open bolt (Note: MG 35/36A: tilting bolt)
- Rate of fire: 480 rounds/min (Kg m/40); 500 rounds/min (MG-35/36)
- Muzzle velocity: 745 m/s (2,440 ft/s)
- Feed system: 20-round BAR magazine; 25-round MG 13 magazine (MG35/36A)
- Sights: Iron

The Kulsprutegevär m/40, Kg m/40 (Machine rifle model 40) is an automatic rifle used by the Swedish Army during the 1940s.

The rifle was negatively referred to as "galopperande järnsängen" (the "galloping iron bed") by soldiers owing to its recoil. It primarily saw use with the Swedish Home Guard during World War II but was withdrawn from service and replaced with the older Swedish version of the M1918 Browning Automatic Rifle known as the Kg m/21 afterward.

== History ==
For many years, it was assumed that the rifle was developed from the German Knorr-Bremse MG35/36, which saw use with the Wehrmacht and reportedly the Waffen-SS. However, research by Swedish military historian Stellan Bojerud showed that the Kg m/40 was developed from a patent from 1933, in most countries registered to Ivar Joseph Stack as well as Axel Torsten Lindfors, while in Canada and the United States to Hans Lauf, who may have designed the rifle in Sweden to evade the ban on German weapons development mandated by the Versailles treaty. The patented design was known to as LH33 and chambered in 6.5x55mm Swedish, and was unsuccessfully marketed by Lindfors in the United Kingdom in the mid-1930s where it was known as the Lindfors gun.

When Adolf Hitler announced open rearmament in 1935, Hans Lauf patented a similar rifle design known as LH35 and an improved version the following year known as the LH 36. The Knorr-Bremse MG35/36 was thus developed from the LH 35 and LH 36 patent, and chambered in 7.92x57mm Mauser. The Wehrmacht initially rejected the rifle in favour of the MG34, but as the German army expanded Waffenfabrik Steyr was contracted to manufacture a version of the MG35/36 that had been improved by Wendelin Przykalla in 1939. 500 were ordered. The rifle were nicknamed "the Knorr-Bremse" and superseded in service by the MG34 and MG 42 as World War II progressed.

With the advent of war in Europe, Sweden's military was substantially expanded and the creation of a military reserve force was sanctioned by parliament, resulting in an urgent need for light machine guns. While the army had accepted an improved version of the Kg m/21 referred to as the Kg m/37 into service, production was too slow to meet increasing demand. In June 1940, Swedish Army Materiel Administration awarded a recently founded company, AB Emge, later renamed Svenska Automatvapen AB (SAV), which counted Lindfors among its founders, a contract to manufacture and deliver a total of 2,500 Kg m/40s between January and May 1941, with an additional order of 125 sometime in autumn 1941, and another order of 2,300 rifles to be delivered between September 1942 and June 1943 was made in June 1942.

Manufacturing was not done in-house by SAV who sub-contracted various factories in the Stockholm area to manufacture the respective parts and only assembled the rifles in their factories. The quality of the rifles were poor and comparative trials held between January and March 1941 were plagued by accidents and malfunctions. In June 1941, it was concluded that the Kg m/40 was still not fit for mass production, with all the previously delivered guns being returned to SAV for adjustments. This eliminated hope in the Army Materiel Administration that the rifle could replace the more costly and harder to manufacture Kg m/37 in service.

In total, 4,926 rifles were delivered to Swedish forces, one more than contracted for reasons not stated, with the last in September 1943.

=== Design ===
The Kg m/40 possessed a similar locking mechanism as the ZB vz. 26 that was also in use with the Swedish army. The rifle uses a 20-round magazine interchangeable with the Kg m/21 and Kg m/37 that was loaded from the left, similar to the FG 42. It had a rate of fire of 480 rounds per minute.

== Users ==
- Nazi Germany
- Norway – When Sweden began training the Danish Brigade and Norwegian police troops in Sweden during World War II, they were offered the Kg m/40. Danish troops were reportedly unhappy with the rifle and were given the Kg m/37 instead. The Norwegian government were more accepting and ordered 480 rifles.
- Sweden – Brief service with the Swedish Army where it was unpopular and passed on to the Home Guard, who discarded them in favour of the Kg m/21 soon after the war.

== See also ==
- Bren light machine gun
- FG-42
- FM-24/29
- Lahti-Saloranta M/26
- M1941 Johnson machine gun
- MG 30
- SVT-40
