= List of 7.62×54mmR firearms =

The below table gives a list of firearms that can fire the 7.62×54mmR cartridge. The cartridge was originally developed for the Mosin–Nagant rifle and introduced in 1891 by the Russian Empire. It was the service cartridge of the late Tsarist era and throughout the Soviet period to the present-day Russia and other countries as well. The 7.62×54mmR remains one of the few standard-issue rimmed cartridges still in military use, and has one of the longest service lives of any military-issued cartridge. This table is sortable for every column.

Name	Type	Country	Image	Years of service	Notes
JS 7.62	Bolt-action sniper rifle	China		2005–present	
Type 67 machine gun	General-purpose machine gun	China		1967–present	
Type 80 machine gun	General-purpose machine gun	China		1983–present	Chinese variant of PKM machine gun.
Alejandro sniper rifle	Bolt-action sniper rifle	Cuba		2002–present	
UK vz. 59	General-purpose machine gun	Czechoslovakia		1959–present	
Madsen machine gun	Light machine gun	Denmark		1902–1940s	Export variants.
KGK machine gun	General-purpose machine gun	Hungary		1960s–1990s	Derived from the SGM machine gun.
Type 73 light machine gun	Light machine gun	North Korea		1973–present	Derived from the PKM machine gun.
PSL	Designated marksman rifle	Romania		1974–present	
Mosin–Nagant	Bolt-action rifle	Russian Empire		1891–present	
Berdan II	Bolt-action rifle	Russian Empire		1895–1920s	Rechambered from the original 10.67×58mmR.
PM M1910	Heavy machine gun	Russian Empire		1910–present	Derived from the Maxim gun.
AVS-36	Battle rifle	Soviet Union		1936–1953	
SVT-38	Semi-automatic rifle	Soviet Union		1938–present	
SVT-40	Semi-automatic rifle	Soviet Union		1940–present	
SVD	Designated marksman rifle	Soviet Union		1963–present	
Baryshev AVB-7.62	Battle rifle	Soviet Union		1985	
PV-1	Light machine gun	Soviet Union		1928–1945	Derived from the PM M1910.
DP-27	Light machine gun	Soviet Union		1928–present	
ShKAS	Light machine gun	Soviet Union		1934–1945	
DS-39	Medium machine gun	Soviet Union		1939–1950s	
Savin–Norov machine gun	Light machine gun	Soviet Union		1939–1940	
SG-43 Goryunov	Medium machine gun	Soviet Union		1943–present	
RP-46	Light machine gun	Soviet Union		1946–present	Variant of DP-27.
Garanin general-purpose machine guns	General-purpose machine gun	Soviet Union		1957	
PK machine gun	General-purpose machine gun	Soviet Union		1961–present	
PKM machine gun	General-purpose machine gun	Soviet Union		1969–present	Variant of the PK machine gun.
GShG-7.62	Rotary-barrel machine gun	Soviet Union		1970–present	
SVU	Designated marksman rifle	Russia		1994–present	Derived from the SVD.
Berkut rifle	Semi-automatic rifle	Russia		1998–present	
SV-98	Bolt-action sniper rifle	Russia		2003–present	
SVCh	Designated marksman rifle	Russia		2022–present	
PKP Pecheneg	General-purpose machine gun	Russia		2001–present	Variant of the PKM machine gun.
AEK-999	General-purpose machine gun	Russia		2008–present	Derived from the PKM machine gun.
Winchester Model 1895	Lever-action rifle	United States		1915–1945	Export variant for Russian Empire.
Zastava M91	Designated marksman rifle	Serbia and Montenegro		1992–present	
Zastava M84	General-purpose machine gun	Yugoslavia		1985–present	Yugoslav variant of PKM machine gun.

== See also ==
- List of 7.62×39mm firearms
- List of 7.62×51mm NATO firearms
- List of 7.92×57mm Mauser firearms
- List of .30-06 Springfield firearms
- .303 British
- 7.5×54mm
