= Sturmgewehr 52 =

Swiss experimental battle rifle

- Type: Battle rifle
- Place of origin: Switzerland

Production history
- Designed: 1950s
- Manufacturer: W+F Bern
- Variants: Stgw 52; Stgw 54

Specifications
- Cartridge: 7.5×38mm Kurzpatrone (Stg-51); 7.5×55mm Swiss (Stg-54)
- Action: Gas-operated, tilting-bolt
- Feed system: Magazine
- Sights: Iron sights

The Sturmgewehr 52 (StG 52) was an experimental battle rifle developed and manufactured by the government-owned W+F Bern in Switzerland. It was initially chambered for the 7.5 mm Kurzpatrone intermediate cartridge and was later developed as the Sturmgewehr 54 (StG 54), chambered for the 7.5 mm Swiss service cartridge. The design was strongly influenced by the German FG 42, featuring side-mounted magazines and a muzzle attachment designed for launching rifle grenades.

The Sturmgewehr 52 incorporated several design features associated with the German FG 42, including a side-mounted magazine and a similar overall layout. It was designed with a gas-operated action and a tilting-bolt locking system, and could be fitted with a muzzle device for launching rifle grenades. The later Sturmgewehr 54 retained the general design while being adapted to fire the standard 7.5×55mm Swiss service cartridge.

== See also ==
- SIG 510
- TRW Low Maintenance Rifle
- List of assault rifles
- List of battle rifles
