= Dror light machine gun =

Dror Light Machine Gun
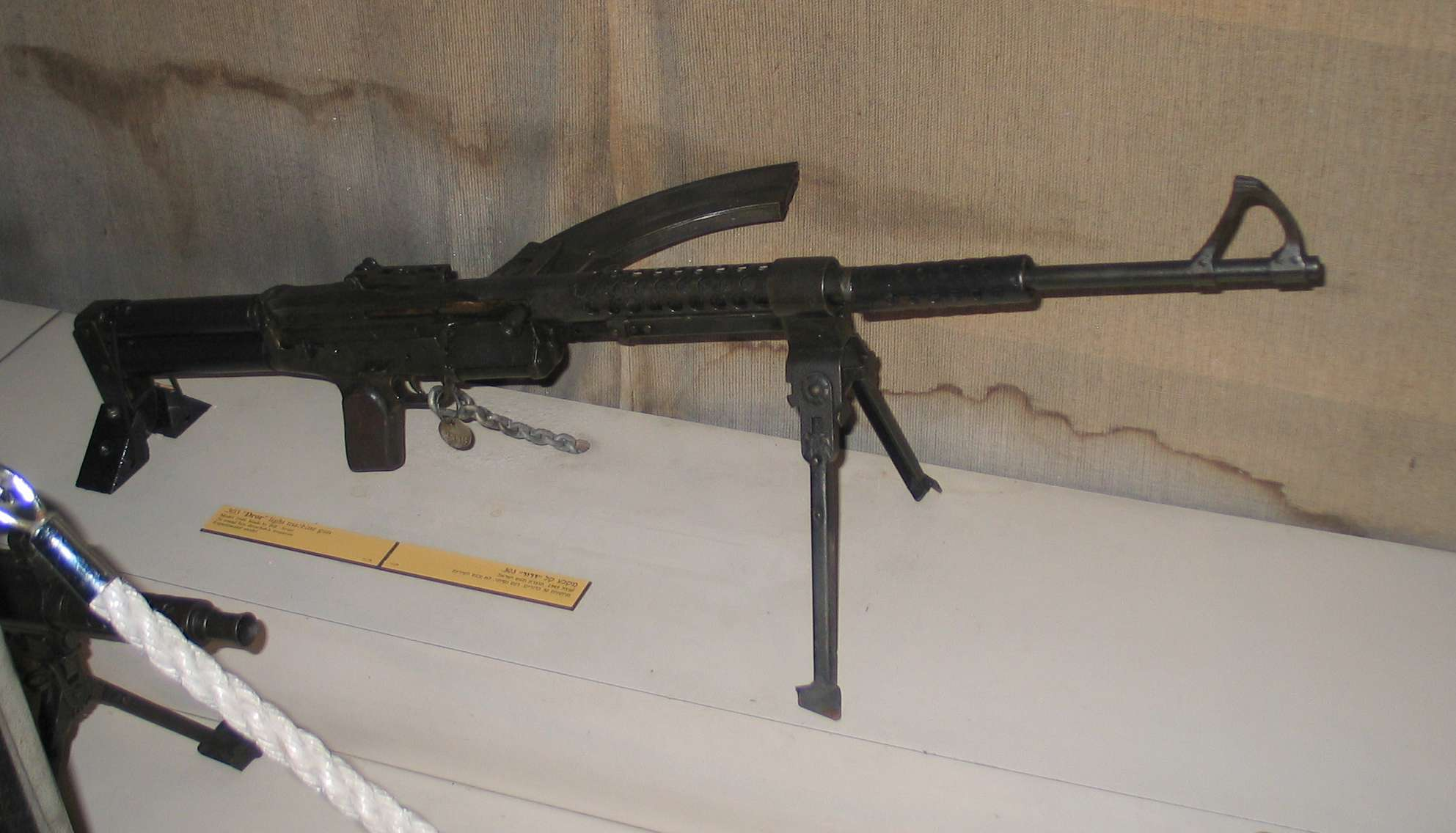
- The Pattern 1 Dror LMG on display at the Batey ha-Osef museum.
- Type: Light machine gun
- Place of origin: Israel

Service history
- In service: 1947 to 1950
- Used by: Haganah (1948); IDF (After 1948)
- Wars: Not used in combat

Production history
- Designer: Winchester Repeating Arms Co.
- Designed: 1946
- Manufacturer: Haganah (Pattern 1); Israel Military Industries (Pattern 2)
- Produced: 1947 to 1952
- No. built: 800-1000 (Pattern 1 Only)
- Variants: Pattern 1 Dror, Pattern 2 Dror

Specifications
- Mass: 10 kg (22 lb)
- Length: 1,240 mm (48.8 in)
- Barrel length: 680 mm (26.8 in)
- Cartridge: .303 British (Pattern 1); 7.92×57mm Mauser (Pattern 2)
- Action: Air-cooled, short recoil
- Rate of fire: variable 250–950 rounds/minute
- Muzzle velocity: 2,600 fps
- Feed system: 20-round magazine, based on M1941 Johnson magazine (Pattern 1); 20-round magazine based on BAR magazine (Pattern 2)

The Dror light machine gun (Hebrew for "Sparrow") was an Israeli light machine gun based on the M1941 Johnson light machine gun.

Some Drors are on display at the IDF History Museum.

== Development ==
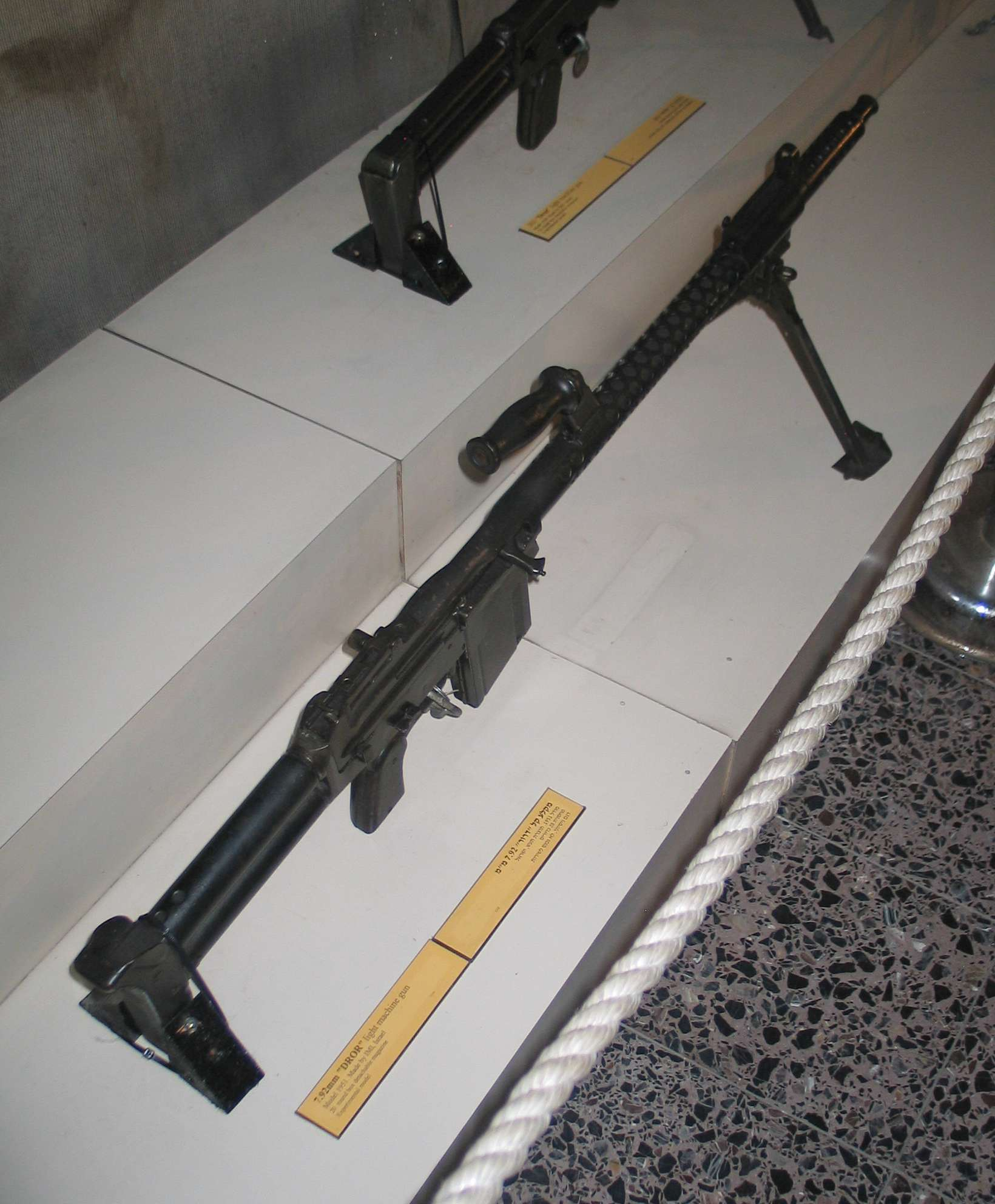
The Pattern 2-type Dror LMG on display at the Batey ha-Osef Museum.

In 1946, Ta'as studied plans to produce an indigenous light machine gun. By the end of the year, the Haganah (precursor to the Israel Defense Forces) bought the manufacturing rights to the M1941 Johnson machine gun from the Winchester Repeating Arms Company and developed the Dror in its own clandestine workshops. They were bought alongside manufacturing tools bought cheaply as scrap in the United States.

Yisrael Galili was in charge of overseeing the Dror's production.

=== Design ===
The Dror is air-cooled and recoil-operated. The barrel uses a rotary bolt with multiple radial lugs mounted. The Dror is fired from an open-bolt in full auto for better cooling, or from a closed-bolt in semi-auto for better accuracy.

The Pattern 1 Dror bore a physical resemblance to the Johnson, including the tall front sight and the barrel release. The Pattern 2 Drors had many changes from the first one by adapting to a rimless round and the use of modified 20-round BAR LMG magazines to balance the weapon.

Its barrel release is now located at the front barrel bearing with a heat shield, which is colored orange/brown, and can be removed without the need for protective gloves. A folding cover is also mounted over the magazine well so that the gunner can close it to prevent dirt and other foul elements from going inside when the weapon is not used.

A fire selector is located on the right side, above the pistol grip. The LMG has a metal butt, made up of two parallel steel tubes with a sheet-steel buttplate.

=== Production history ===
Because large amounts of British rifle ammunition was available, the Pattern 1 Dror was initially chambered in .303 British. Around 800–1000 were made before production was halted due to feeding problems the armourers could not handle.

The Pattern 2 Dror was built by IMI and was chambered in 7.92×57 mm Mauser to take advantage of large quantities of recently imported Mauser ammunition. In this pattern, the magazines were mounted vertically under the receiver.

== Service history ==
Because of its oversensitivity to dusty environments, the Dror did not see combat service in the 1947–1949 War of Independence.

Following combat simulation testing, the Israel Defense Forces selected the FN Model D (a derivative of the M1918 Browning Automatic Rifle) to replace the Dror in 1952.
