= Fosbery Pump Shotgun =

- Type: Shotgun
- Place of origin: United Kingdom

Specifications
- Cartridge: 16 Gauge
- Barrels: 1
- Action: Pump-action, Rotating bolt
- Feed system: 5 round box Magazine

The Fosbery Pump Shotgun was a prototype pump action shotgun designed in 1891 chambered in 16 Gauge. The weapon was the first to use a multi-lug rotating bolt predating what would later be used on the M1941 Johnson machine gun and the ArmaLite AR-10.

== See also ==
- List of shotguns
