= Komodo Armament D7 PMR SA =

D7 Assault rifle
- Type: Designated Marksman Rifle
- Place of origin: Indonesia

Production history
- Designer: Komodo Armament
- Manufacturer: Komodo Armament
- Produced: 2014 (?)–present

Specifications
- Mass: 4.1 kg (empty)
- Length: 950 mm fully extended
- Barrel length: 16.5 in (420 mm)
- Cartridge: 7.62×51mm NATO
- Caliber: 7.62mm
- Action: Semi auto only, gas-operated, direct gas impingement
- Rate of fire: 500 rpm
- Muzzle velocity: 830 m/s
- Effective firing range: 600 m
- Feed system: 30 round polymer magazine
- Sights: Iron sights, but optical sights are possible with the picatinny rail provision.

Komodo Armament D7 PMR SA is a semi-automatic designated marksman rifle produced by PT Komodo Armament Indonesia. The rifle is using 7.62x51 mm NATO ammunition. The abbreviation PMR SA stands for "Precision Marksman Rifle Single action".

It is also referred to as DMR semi auto D7, where the DMR stands for "Designated Marksman Rifle".

== Design ==
Like other Komodo Armament rifles, D7 PMR SA rifle is manufactured using polymer material, with cerakote or hard anodize finish. Unlike the D5 assault rifle with gas and piston-driven operation, the D7 PMR SA is gas-operated only.

It has 2 picatinny rails at the 12 and 6 o'clock positions, but an additional 2 can be added at 9 and 3 o'clock using the rail integration system (RIS) on the hand guard. Like the D5, the barrel cover (hand guard) is made with several open cavities, making heat dissipation from the barrel faster. The barrel cover model is also designed to be lightweight but rigid. For the buttstock, D7 uses a polymer telescoping stock.

Polymer material is also used for the D7 PMR SA's 30-round magazines.

== See also ==
- Pindad SS3, Pindad battle rifle
- Pindad SS2, current Indonesian army service rifle
