= FG 42 =

German automatic paratrooper rifle

Fallschirmjägergewehr 42
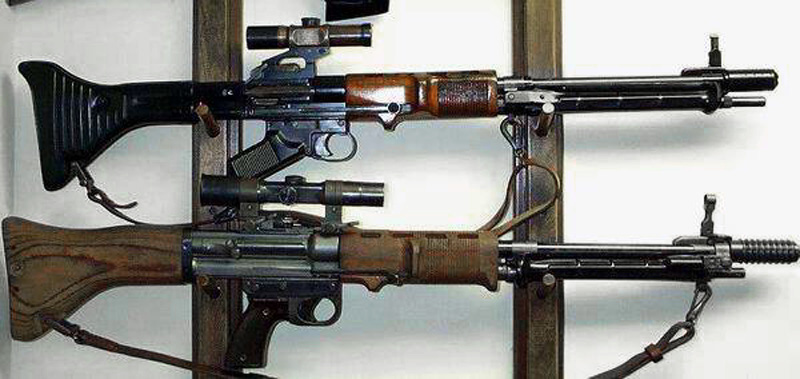
- Both early model (top) and late model (bottom) variants of the FG 42 with telescopic sights.
- Type: Battle rifle; Automatic rifle
- Place of origin: Nazi Germany

Service history
- In service: 1943–1945
- Used by: Nazi Germany
- Wars: World War II

Production history
- Designer: Louis Stange
- Designed: 1941–1942
- Manufacturer: Rheinmetall (limited); Heinrich Krieghoff Waffenfabrik, L. O. Dietrich (limited)
- Produced: 1943–1945
- No. built: ~7,000
- Variants: Early model (original Rheinmetall-Borsig design); Late model (Krieghoff revision)

Specifications
- Mass: 4.2 kg (9.3 lb) Type I; 4.95 kg (10.9 lb) Type II
- Length: 945 mm (37.2 in) Type I; 975 mm (38.4 in) Type II
- Barrel length: 500 mm (19.7 in)
- Cartridge: 7.92×57mm Mauser
- Action: Gas-operated, rotating bolt
- Rate of fire: c. 900 rounds/min Type I; c. 750 rounds/min Type II; c. 250 rounds/min practical
- Muzzle velocity: 740 m/s (2,428 ft/s) (SmK bullet)
- Effective firing range: 600 m (1,968.5 ft)
- Feed system: 10- or 20-round detachable box magazine 5-round stripper clips
- Sights: Iron sights (all models); flip-up front post and folding rear diopter sight; ZFG42 or ZF4 telescopic sight

The FG 42 (German: Fallschirmjägergewehr 42, "paratrooper rifle 42") is a selective-fire 7.92×57mm Mauser automatic rifle produced in Nazi Germany during World War II. The weapon was developed specifically for the use of the Fallschirmjäger airborne infantry in 1942 and was used in very limited numbers until the end of the war.

It combined the characteristics and firepower of a light machine gun in a lightweight form slightly shorter (but considerably bulkier and heavier) than the standard-issue Karabiner 98k bolt-action infantry rifle. Considered one of the most advanced weapon designs of World War II, the FG 42 influenced post-war small arms development, and many features of its design, such as general shape, stock style, gas-rotating bolt operation and sheet metal and plastic construction were copied by the US Army when it developed the M60 machine gun.

== History ==
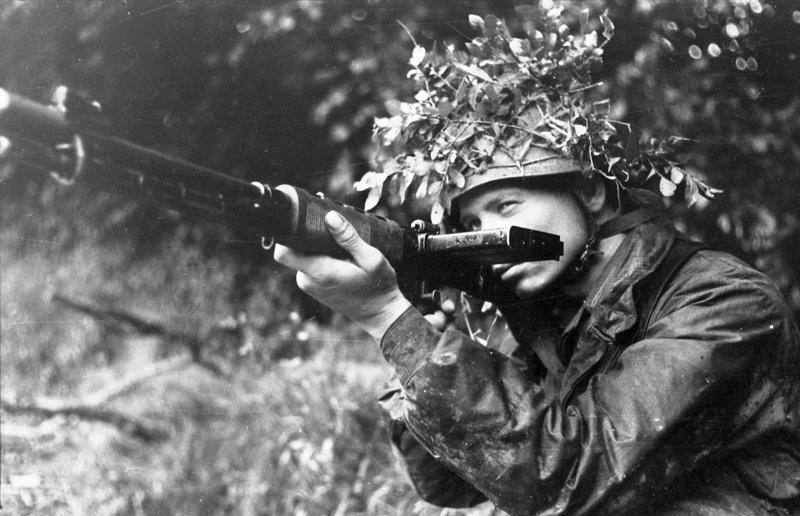
A German Fallschirmjäger poses with his early model FG 42 (Ausführung "C") in France, 1944.

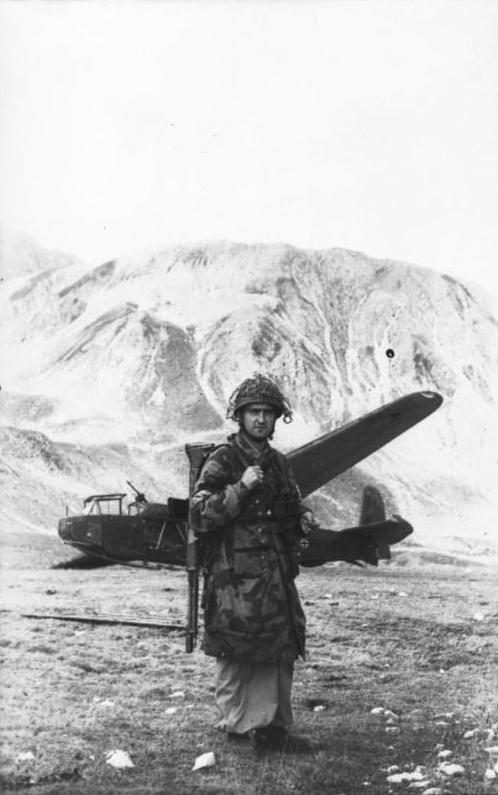
The FG 42 was used by paratroopers of the Fallschirmjäger Lehrbattalion (Paratroopers' Instructional Battalion) to try out new equipment during the raid to free Benito Mussolini in September 1943.

At the time of the Battle of Crete (Operation Mercury), German Fallschirmjäger (parachute infantry) were equipped with the same assortment of small arms as the Heer, carrying only 9×19mm Parabellum chambered pistols and hand grenades on them during parachute jumps, with 9×19mm Parabellum submachine guns, 7.92×57mm Mauser chambered rifles, and crew-served weapons stored separately in containers that were dropped from the wing of the exit craft. The German RZ parachute harness, with one single riser and two straps attached to the body, making the paratrooper land on his hands and knees in a forward roll, did not allow heavier equipment such as rifles and machine guns to be safely carried during airborne jumps. At Crete, long-range rifle and machine gun fire from dug-in Commonwealth defenders inflicted heavy casualties on the outgunned German paratroopers in the early stages of battle as they attempted to retrieve their support weapons from containers scattered all over the battlefield. These combat experiences demonstrated the need for a rifle that could be carried by the paratrooper during a drop.

The classifications of the development and production Ausführungen (types) are as follows:

- Type A - First design
- Type B - Revised model prototype
- Type C - "LC-6" prototype
- Type D - First Fallschirmjägergewehr; acceptance trials
- Type E - First production Fallschirmjägergewehr (sometimes called the Modell I ("Type I")
- Type F - First stamped receiver Fallschirmjägergewehr
- Type G - Final production model Fallschirmjägergewehr (sometimes called the Modell II ("Type II")

=== Development ===
In 1941, the German Air Force (Luftwaffe) requested a selective-fire hand-held weapon for the paratroopers; Senior Staff Air Secretary Ossenbach at the GL/C Erprobungsstelle-6 (GL/C E-6—the Luftwaffe Weapons Development Branch at Tarnewitz near Wismar) was approached informally to develop this special new weapon. The Reich Air Ministry (Reichsluftfahrtministerium or RLM) sought to develop a universal shoulder-fired automatic rifle that could replace the bolt-action rifle, submachine gun, and light machine gun in the air assault role. The proposed weapon would also simplify logistics and provide greater firepower to the individual paratrooper.

The RLM attempted to initiate a formal weapons development program through the Heereswaffenamt (the HWaA, or Army Ordnance Department)—responsible for German small arms development—but conflicting priorities and friction with the Army (the HWaA dismissed the undertaking as unrealistic and offered its G 41(W) semi-automatic rifle instead) led to an independent development by the Luftwaffe. Plans were laid out to form a central authority for the new program at the Luftwaffe's Erprobungstelle coastal testing station at Tarnewitz. The engineers on staff had acquired considerable expertise developing lightweight automatic weapons, having successfully converted the MG 15 aircraft machine gun to a ground configuration. However, due to the high casualties sustained by the paratroopers during Operation Mercury, Hitler changed his mind about the usefulness of airborne assaults and the plans were terminated. Nevertheless, Luftwaffe Reichsmarschall Hermann Göring privately ordered the continuation of the project.

The RLM went directly to German industry with its plans—the so-called LC-6 specification issued 14 December 1941 mentioned amongst others that the weapon should not exceed 1,000 mm (39.4 in) in length, should not be significantly heavier than the Karabiner 98k bolt action standard service rifle, should be able to fire single shots from a closed bolt, provide fully automatic fire from an open bolt, feed from detachable 10- or 20-round magazines and be able to mount a bayonet and use rifle grenades. Louis Stange converted some FG 42 into 7.92×33mm Kurz, which was an intermediate cartridge promoted by the Heer (developed for the promising MP 43 assault rifle), the Luftwaffe favored the long-range potential of the 7.92×57mm Mauser full-power rifle cartridge and this chambering was one of the main design prerequisites.

==== Prototypes ====
Six manufacturers were solicited for prototype designs: Gustloff-Werke, Mauser, Johannes Großfuß Metall- und Lackierwarenfabrik, C.G. Hänel, Rheinmetall-Borsig and Heinrich Krieghoff Waffenfabrik. Several contracts were awarded but only a few prototypes are known to have been submitted. Mauser offered a version of the MG 81 (rejected due to excessive weight and its belt-fed operation) while Krieghoff presented a rising-block prototype, which too was quickly dropped. A design credited to Rheinmetall-Borsig's Louis Stange of Sömmerda who had previously worked on the MG 34 proved satisfactory and underwent military trials conducted by the GL/C E-6 test station at Tarnewitz in mid-1942. This early prototype, known under the factory designation Gerät 450 ("device 450") or Ausführung "A" ("type A"), was intended to be a pure sheet metal design, using pressed steel in the construction of the receiver, buttstock and corrugated handguard. The proposed system of operation was modeled on that used in World War I Lewis light machine gun, with a gas-operated turning bolt action geared to a spiral (clock-type) recoil spring. The type "A" was never produced beyond model form, but the basic design layout was retained for further development.

With the basic characteristics of the LC-6 accepted, a series of modifications followed. The revised Ausführung "B" replaced the sheet metal handguard with a resin-impregnated fiber type that provided protection against heat and a better grip when wet.

These tests exposed several shortcomings, addressed by Stange in April 1942 with the LC-6/II prototype. The prototype was then submitted to a series of endurance tests led by the HWA and further modified to increase functional reliability and durability, resulting in the final LC-6/III prototype variant that was ultimately accepted into production as the FG 42. Fifty rifles were fabricated by Rheinmetall-Borsig for evaluation purposes by the end of 1942.

A pre-series batch of 50 rifles was produced in early 1943 and 6 examples were sent to GL/C E-6 for additional testing. Almost identical to the LC-6/III, these guns differ from later models by using a smooth sheet metal buttstock and an experimental muzzle brake. The weapons experienced serious malfunctions: one rifle suffered a catastrophic failure after firing only 2,100 rounds, a soldier was injured when attempting to fire a rifle grenade and the pressed metal buttstock would deform after launching a small number of rifle grenades.

=== Production ===
Several other improvements were made before being authorized for large-scale production. The original Rheinmetall design used chrome-nickel steel heavily in many essential components, a strategic alloy in short supply. When the Luftwaffe was finally given permission to produce 3,000 rifles for combat trials, the material specifications were changed to accommodate the use of manganese steel as a substitute. The Heinrich Krieghoff company of Suhl (authors of the previous unsuccessful LC-6 tender) was contracted to manufacture the FG 42 in limited quantity as Rheinmetall did not have the capacity to bring the FG 42 into serial production.

The weapon system underwent continuous development. Its expedited development, remedial changes to the original design and ever-changing Luftwaffe requirements resulted in a myriad of variants. Post-war literature typically identifies three versions, however the Germans did not give them separate designations; the Modell I, and Modell II were never officially referenced and period documents simply refer to the weapon as the 'Fallschirmjägergewehr 42' or "FG 42", and the reference was always made to the latest production model.

==== First operational use ====
The weapon saw first operational use during the Gran Sasso raid (Unternehmen Eiche) in September 1943 when German paratroopers and Waffen-SS commandos rescued Italian dictator Benito Mussolini from his captors – 200 well-equipped Carabinieri guards. However, during the whole airborne operation (which was personally ordered by Hitler) not a single shot was fired.

=== Deployment ===
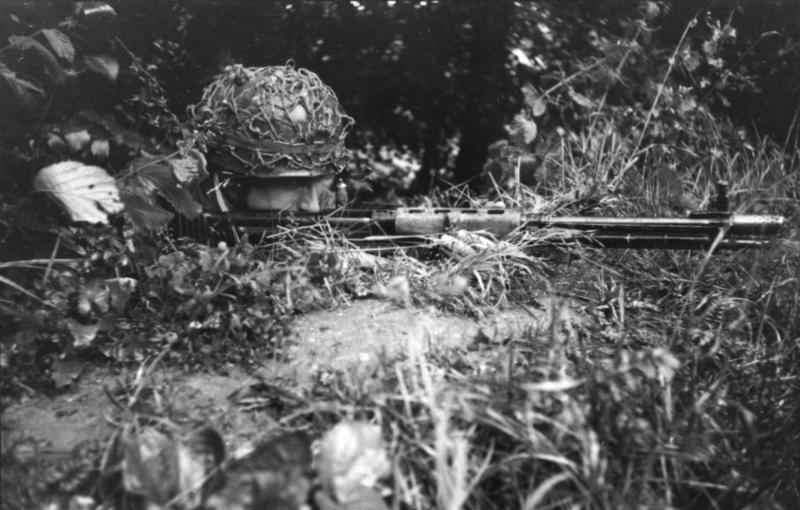
A Fallschirmjäger firing the early FG 42 in June 1944

After approximately 2,000 FG 42s had been produced by Krieghoff, supplies of the manganese steel from which the receivers were forged were diverted to other needs; this meant a redesign was required to use stamped sheet metal in its place. Field reports that the lightweight rifle was not sturdy enough to handle full-power rifle ammunition in cyclic mode made Krieghoff engineers design the Type G. Improvements were: relocating the bipod from the front of the handguard to the muzzle to reduce shot dispersion; changing the pistol grip angle to near vertical; enlarging the handguard and changing the stock from stamped steel to wood to minimize overheating, adding weight to the bolt and lengthen its travel to reduce the cyclic rate of fire. Also a four position gas regulator was fitted, the bolt and recoil spring were changed to wound wire, a case deflector was fitted and the muzzle brake and the bayonet mount was changed. These changes, particularly the pistol grip change and the bipod relocation, are clearly visible on late-model FG 42s. Production models also had a simple flip-out spike bayonet under the barrel hidden by the bipod. In the later version the bayonet was shortened from around 10 inches (250 mm) to around 6 inches (150 mm). There were never enough FG 42s to arm most Fallschirmjäger as originally intended. However, most were employed in the Western Front following the events of D-Day, with particular use of the FG 42 during the Battle of Carentan and the Falaise Pocket (nearly a quarter of all FG 42 produced were in the hands of the 2nd Parachute Division).

== Design details ==
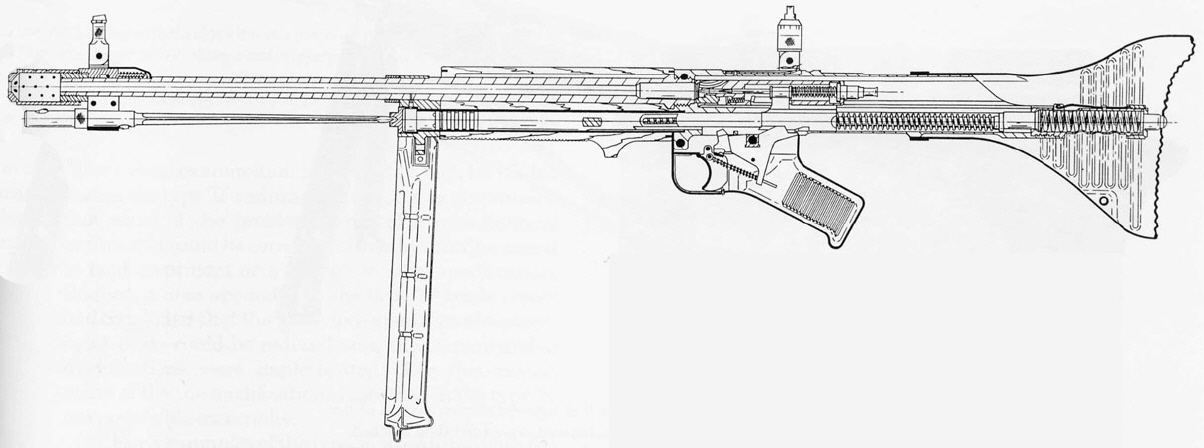
Cross-section of the FG 42 Ausführung E, known informally as the "early model". Characteristics of the early models were the bipod placement (hinged to the barrel collar in front of the handguard), forged receiver, ribbed buttstock, and the sharply angled pistol grip.

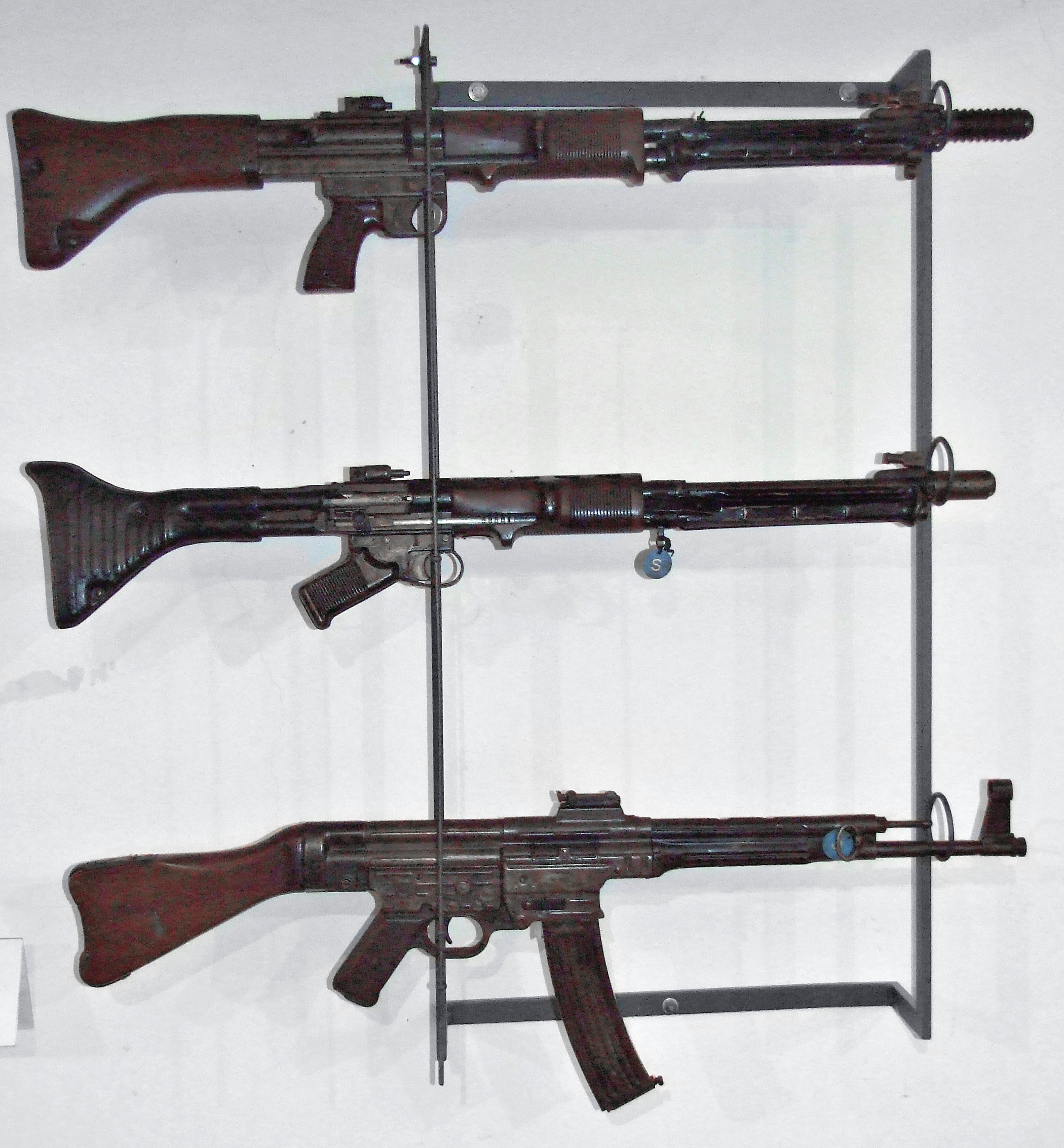
Top to bottom: late model FG 42, early model FG 42 with folded down sight lines and StG 44

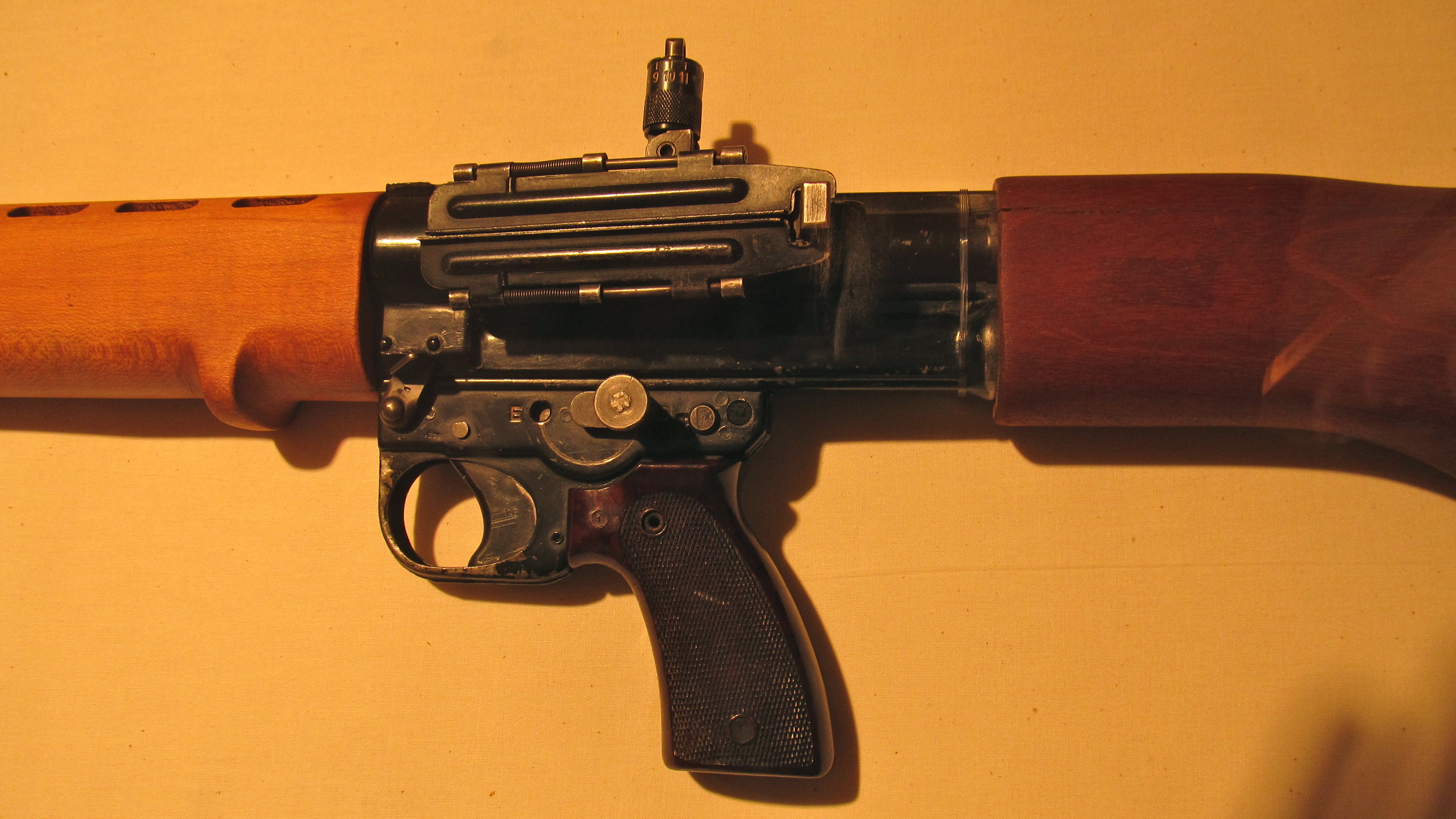
late model FG 42 grip

=== General configuration/layout ===
The FG 42 was a select-fire air-cooled weapon and one of the first to incorporate the "straight-line" recoil configuration. This layout, combined with the side magazine, placed both the center of gravity and the position of the shoulder stock nearly in line with the longitudinal axis of the bore, a feature increasing controllability during burst or automatic fire. The operating system was derived from that used in the successful Lewis light machine gun with a gas piston-actuated rotating bolt locking mechanism. The angled pistol grip on the first model was to maintain familiarity with the Kar98k as well as drop container storage and making it less likely to snag on all the straps of parachute equipment in a descent.

This system used pressurized exhaust gases from the bore and channeled them through a port drilled in the barrel into a gas cylinder located under the barrel. The rapid build-up of propellant gases imparted rearward pressure on a long-stroke piston, driving it backwards, while an extension of the bolt carrier interacted with a helical camming slot machined into the bolt carrier, converting this linear movement into an angular velocity and forcing the bolt into a rotary motion, clearing the locking nuts and unlocking it near the end of the bolt carrier's travel. The weapon was locked into battery by two lugs on the bolt head which recessed into appropriate cavities machined into the receiver walls. Owing to its main intended use by paratroopers, the rear sight (which necessarily was rather high due to the straight stock design) was a flip-up construction. The iron sight line had a 530 mm (20.9 in) sight radius and consisted of an open-pointed-post-type front sight, and a diopter-type rear sight. It was graduated for 7.92×57mm Mauser cartridges from 100 to 1,200 m (109 to 1,312 yd) in 100 m (109 yd) increments. On later models the post front sight was hooded to reduce glare under unfavourable light conditions and add protection for the post.

The top of the receiver of the FG 42 was specifically machined with a long dovetail type base designed to accept telescopic sight mounts. The scope mount featured locking lever(s) that allowed quick installation and removal of a telescopic sight depending on the specific combat scenario; general combat or in a limited sniping role. The telescopic sights used on the FG 42 were the ZFG42 or ZF4.

=== Receiver specifics and magazine feeding ===
The receiver was a sophisticated, machined alloy forging with the magazine housing placed on the left-hand side and the ejection port on the right. Whilst not a true bullpup rifle design the seemingly awkward placement of the magazine housing (horizontally to the side rather than directly beneath the receiver) allowed the bolt mechanism to extend into the buttstock assembly, effectively reducing the overall length of the weapon as the magazine well did not interfere with the location of the pistol grip. The pistol grip was integrated into the trigger group assembly, a separate housing containing the trigger mechanism and fire control components, and was formed from pressed sheet metal during fabrication from two separate halves and then welded together.

The rifle fed from either a 10- or 20-round detachable box magazine or standard 5-round stripper clips into an empty magazine in the gun. The empty weight of the 100 mm (3.9 in) long 10-round magazine is 185 g (6.5 oz) and of the 150 mm (5.9 in) long 20-round magazine 290 g (10 oz).

=== Firing ===
The FG 42 fired in semi-automatic mode from a closed bolt, accomplished by delaying the release of the firing pin (mounted on the bolt carrier and released by the front sear notch) until after the trigger had been pressed; the short lock time, and little movement in the action during firing translated into greater single-shot accuracy. When operating in the automatic mode, the sear mechanism was designed to fire from an open bolt by simultaneously releasing both the bolt and bolt carrier; and with this mode selected, the bolt would remain open between bursts to provide maximum cooling. This had the advantage of preventing a phenomenon known as "cook off" where the heat of repeated rounds being fired caused a chambered round to overheat and prematurely ignite the powder or primer. The rotating fire selector switch was situated in the trigger group, above the pistol grip on the right side. The charge lever also served as the safety, disabling the sear mechanism when engaged.

=== Testing ===
The FG 42 was intended to fill a niche in Nazi Germany's arsenal and was produced only in small numbers. It was somewhat well received by paratroopers when tested, but it did have its drawbacks. The FG 42 had a 20-round, or sometimes 10 round, magazine that was mounted on the left side of the rifle. Though a side-mounted magazine was common in submachine guns of the time, the larger magazine with heavier ammunition of a full-powered rifle tended to unbalance the weapon. In addition controllable bursts were difficult. This made full-automatic fire only marginally useful. The FG 42 used a fairly sophisticated muzzle device that did help with recoil and muzzle flash, but made blast and noise much greater than on other similar weapons. The US M14 rifle had similar problems, and attempts were made to upgrade that rifle the same way with an in-line stock and muzzle device.

== Influences/derivatives ==
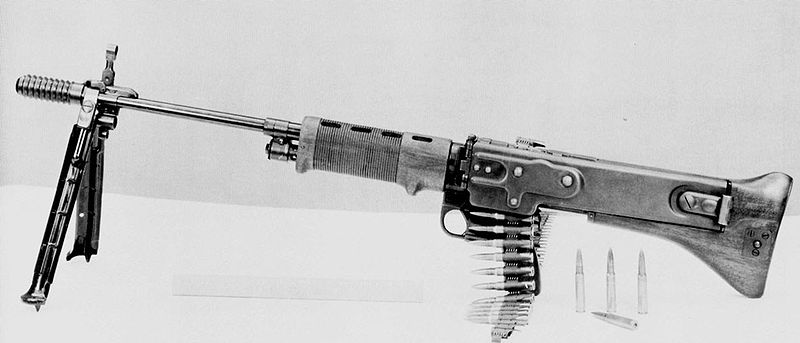
US experimental T44 belt-feeding machine gun developed from the German FG 42 and MG 42

The American M41 Johnson LMG has many parallels with the contemporary FG 42. Both had in-line stocks, fed from the left side, and both fired from the open bolt in automatic mode and closed bolt in semi-automatic mode. Despite these similarities, there is no evidence that either weapon had any effect on the design of the other. As they were both seeking to solve similar problems, it is reasonable to expect that each weapon's respective engineers approached these problems similarly but independently, unaware of the developments of their counterparts.

It is not easy to determine the significance of the FG 42 in terms of weapons history. With a slightly longer barrel and belt-feeding the weapon would have been an excellent light machine gun. Its designer Louis Stange knew that, he also built a prototype with belt feed.

Some features, such as the details of the gas-operated bolt selection process, were studied by US Army engineers after the war. These, along with some aspects of the MG 42 general-purpose machine gun, are commonly reported to have been incorporated in the similarly troubled M60 general-purpose machine gun. The last known derivatives of the FG 42 were the Swiss Sturmgewehr 52 and M60 machine gun.

The scarcity and prohibitive cost of genuine FG 42s in contemporary firearms collecting circles has brought about an industry of reproduction FG 42 style rifles by manufacturers in US and Germany.

== Users ==
- Germany: Used during World War II. Intended for use by all German airborne troops, but was never produced in sufficient numbers for standardized use.

== See also ==
- List of battle rifles
- M1941 Johnson machine gun
- M60 machine gun

== Bibliography ==
- Bishop, Chris (2002). The Encyclopedia of Weapons of World War II. New York, NY: Sterling Publishing. ISBN 1-58663-762-2.
- Dugelby, Thomas B.; R. Blake Stevens (2007) [1990]. Death from Above—The German FG42 Paratroop Rifle. Cobourg, ON: Collector Grade Publications. ISBN 978-0-88935-429-6.
- Miller, David (2007). Fighting Men of World War II: Axis Forces : Uniforms, Equipment and Weapons. Mechanicsburg, PA: Stackpole Books. ISBN 978-0-8117-0277-5.
- Senich, Peter (1987). The German Assault Rifle: 1935–1945. Boulder, CO: Paladin Press. ISBN 0-87364-400-X.
