= Madsen-Saetter machine gun =

General-purpose machine gun Erik Saetter-Lassen

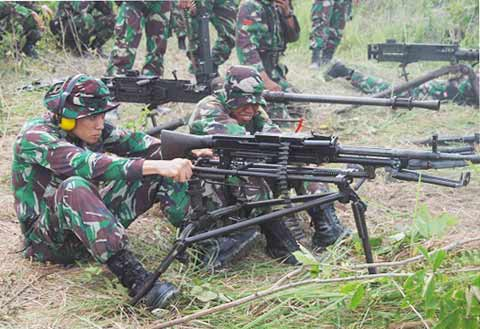
- Indonesian Army Madsen-Saetter
- Type: General-purpose machine gun
- Place of origin: Denmark

Service history
- Used by: Indonesia; El Salvador

Production history
- Designer: Eric Larsen-Saetter
- Designed: 1952–1960
- Manufacturer: DISA

Specifications
- Mass: 11 kilograms (24 lb)
- Length: 1,190 millimetres (47 in)
- Barrel length: 660 mm (26.0 in)
- Cartridge: 7.62×51mm NATO.30-06 Springfield.50 BMG
- Action: gas-operated
- Rate of fire: 700–1000 rounds/min
- Muzzle velocity: 838 m/s (2,749 ft/s)
- Feed system: belt
- Sights: blade foresight and a tangent notch rearsight

The Madsen-Saetter machine gun was a Danish general-purpose machine gun designed in the early 1950s by Eric Larsen-Saetter.

== Service history ==
The machine gun was tested by the British Army but the FN MAG was preferred. Indonesia produced the Mark II version in .30-06 under license at Pindad. Salvadoran Army also received Madsen-Saetters in .30-06, some being latter locally modified to fire 7.62×51mm NATO rounds.

== Variants ==
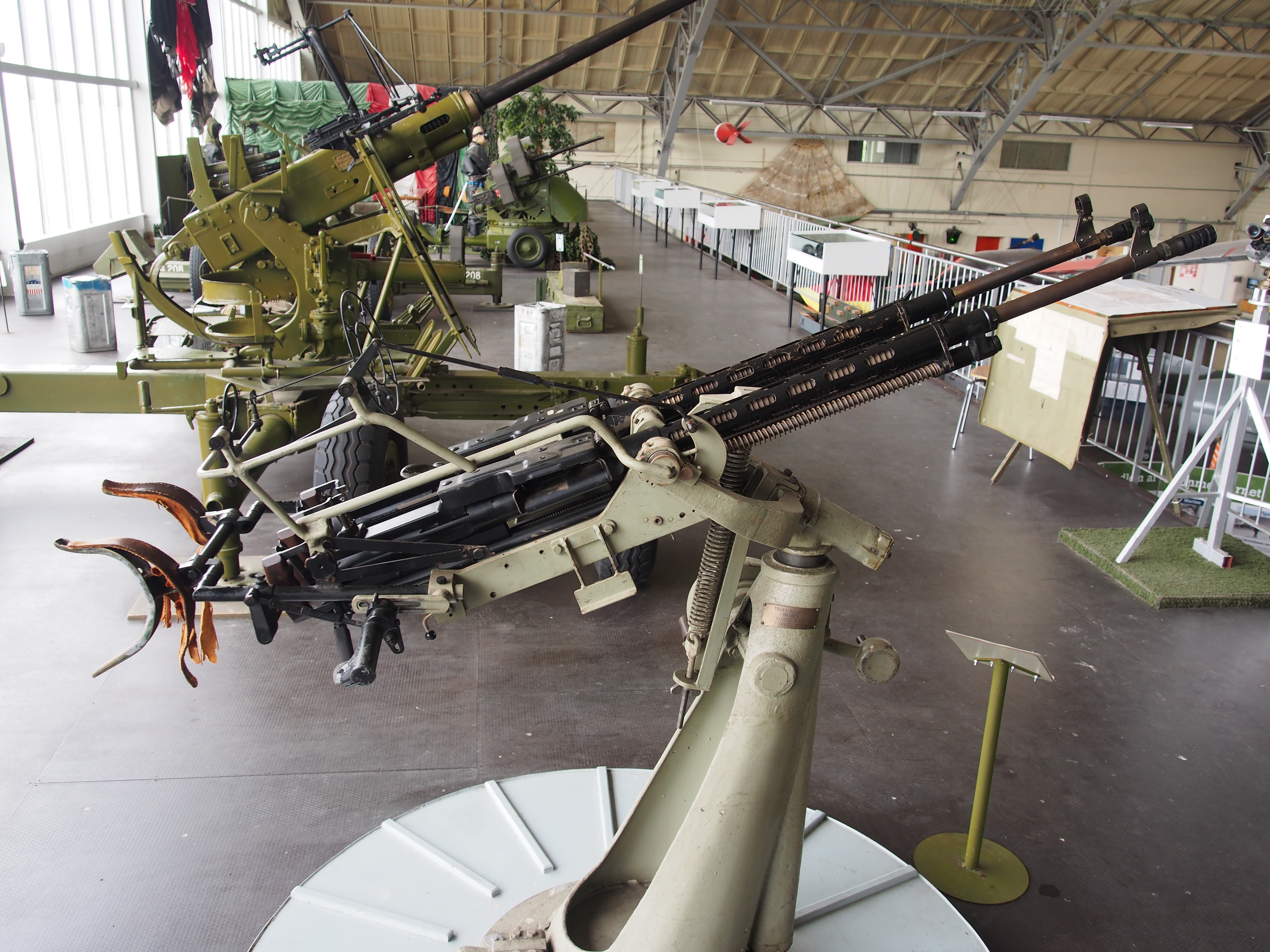
Madsen-Saetter .50 cal on naval twin mount

- Madsen-Saetter Mk I
- Madsen-Saetter Mk II
- Madsen-Saetter Mk III: more reliable and shorter version, developed from 1959
- Madsen-Saetter Mk IV: new version, shorter and lighter
- Madsen-Saetter tank machine gun: tank-mounted version, has no bipod and buttstock. Could be converted for field use by using special lightweight tripod. Manufactured in limited numbers.
- Madsen-Saetter cal. 50 machine gun: prototype of a .50 BMG version. Could be mounted on tanks and armored vehicles, anti-aircraft wheeled mount (similar to DShK wheeled mount), and anti-personnel light tripod.

== See also ==
- Madsen machine gun
