= Model 45A =

- Type: Bullpup battle rifle
- Place of origin: United States; Philippine Commonwealth

Production history
- Designed: 1945

Specifications
- Cartridge: .30-06 Springfield
- Caliber: 7.62mm
- Action: Gas-operated
- Feed system: 20-round detachable box magazine
- Sights: Optical

The Model 45A was a .30 caliber bullpup battle rifle/light machine gun developed by the United States Army in the Philippines in 1945. The weapon existed in prototype or mockup form, but never entered production. The rifle was sparsely documented until annotated photographs of the rifle were found in the archives of the United States Army Signal Corps.

== Design ==
The Model 45A utilized the magazine from the M1918 Browning Automatic Rifle. Rather than iron sights, it featured an integral scope. Its purpose is unclear, but it is alternately described as an "experimental .30 caliber light machine gun (LMG)" or a "field expedient .30 cal."

== See also ==
- Sieg automatic rifle – (United States)
- SLEM-1 – (Belgium)
- EM-2 rifle – (United Kingdom)
- List of bullpup firearms
- List of battle rifles
