= Rotating bolt =

Method of locking used in firearms

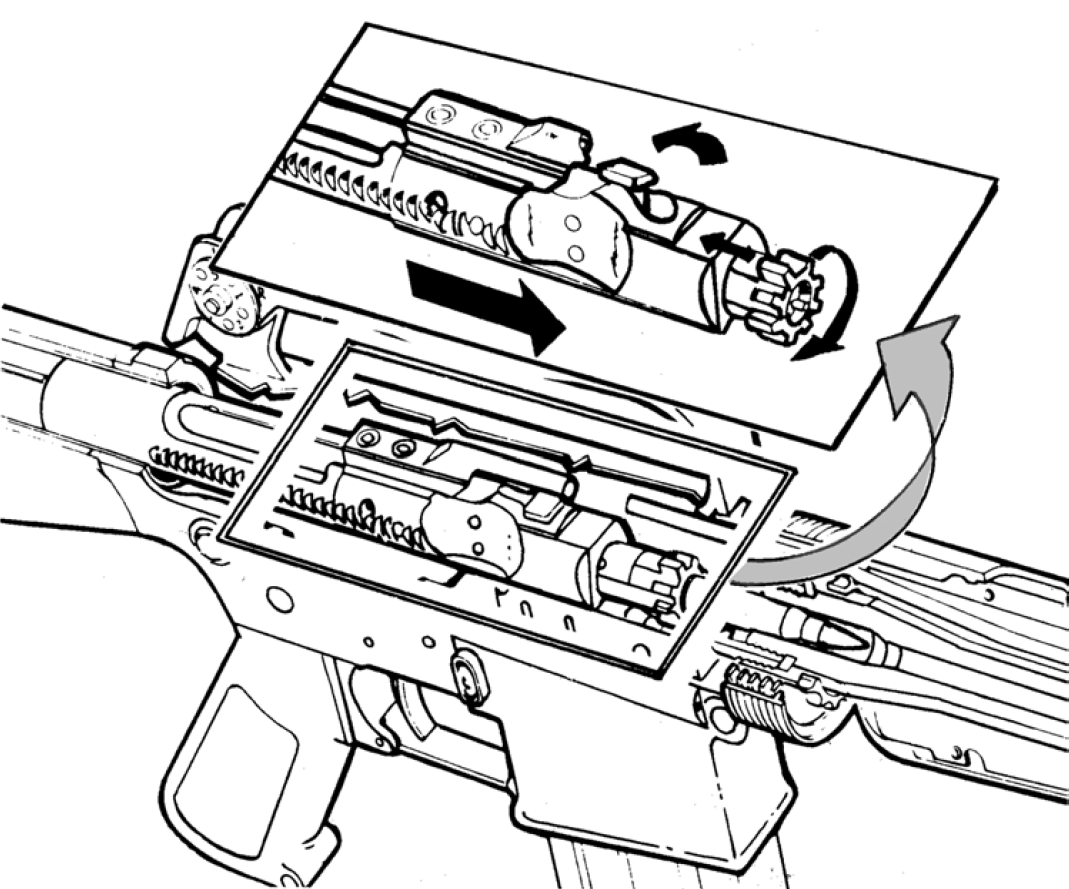
M16 bolt locking
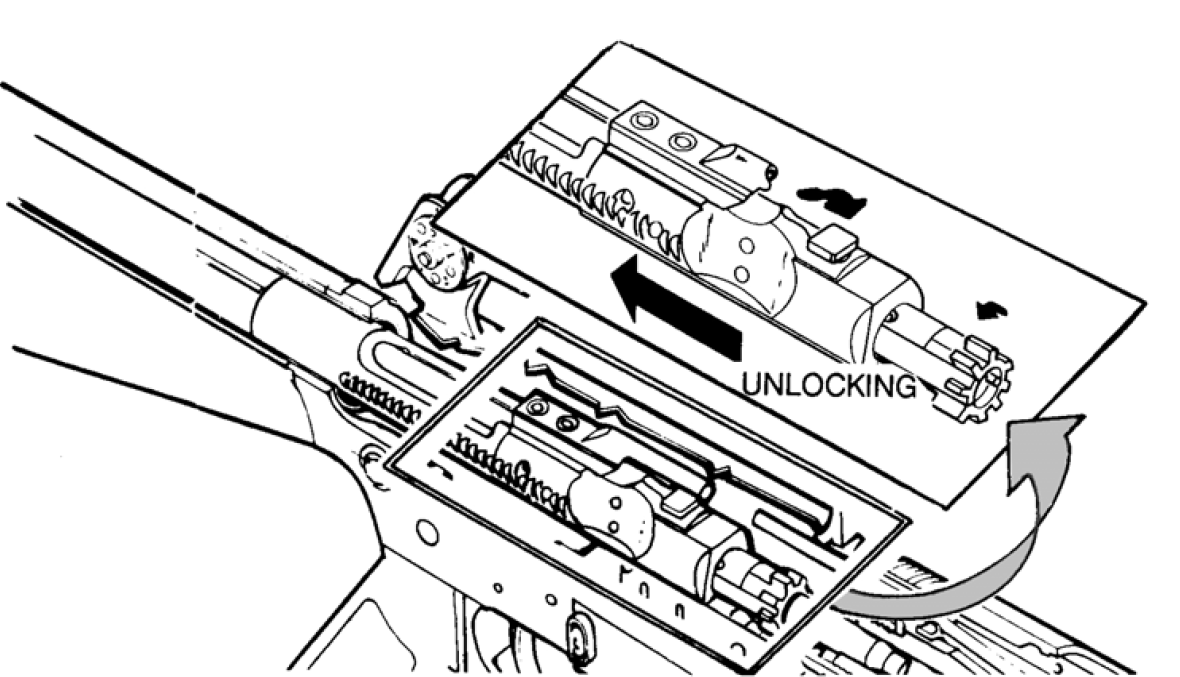
M16 bolt unlocking

Radial-delayed blowback.

Schematic of various rotating bolt locking lugs.

Rotating bolt is a method of locking the breech (or rear barrel) of a firearm closed for firing. Johann Nicolaus von Dreyse developed the first rotating bolt firearm, the "Dreyse needle gun", in 1836. The Dreyse locked using the bolt handle rather than lugs on the bolt head like the Mauser M 98 or M16. The first rotating bolt rifle with two lugs on the bolt head was the Lebel Model 1886 rifle. The concept has been implemented on most firearms chambered for high-powered cartridges since the 20th century.

== Design ==
Ferdinand Ritter von Mannlicher, who had earlier developed a non-rotating bolt straight-pull rifle, developed the Steyr-Mannlicher M1895, a straight-pull rifle with a rotating bolt, which was issued to the Austro-Hungarian Army. Mannlicher then developed the M1893 auto rifle which had a screw delayed bolt and later the Mannlicher M1900 operated by a gas piston. This was an inspiration for later gas operated, semi-automatic and selective fire firearms (such as the M1, M14, M16, the L85A1/A2 and the AK-47/74) in which the bolt, upon contact with the breech, rotates and locks into place, the lugs on the bolt locking into the breech or barrel extension.

Upon closing, the bolt goes forward into barrel extension or locking recesses in the receiver, and then rotates; at this point it is locked in place. The bolt remains locked until the action is cycled, either manually by the operator, or mechanically by delayed blowback, recoil operation, or gas operation which then rotates the bolt and unlocks it from the breech so that it can be withdrawn in order to extract and eject the spent casing, and the next round can be chambered. In gas operation, the gas port, which meters a portion of the combustion gases into the action in order to cycle the weapon, is typically located either midway down the barrel or near the muzzle of the weapon. In this way it functions as a delay, ensuring that the bolt remains locked until chamber pressure has subsided to a safe level.

Rotating bolts are found in gas-operated, recoil-operated, bolt action, lever-action, and pump-action weapon designs.

== Examples ==
- M1 Garand, gas-operated semi-automatic rifle
- M25 Sniper Weapon System, semi-automatic rifle, gas operated, air cooled
- Lebel Model 1886 rifle, bolt-action rifle
- Steyr-Mannlicher M1895, a straight-pull rifle
- Fosbery Pump Shotgun, a 16 bore pump-action shotgun
- M16, a gas-operated rifle
- AK-47, a gas-operated rifle
- Oerlikon KBA 25mm, gas-operated autocannon
- Imbel IA2, a gas-operated assault rifle
- IWI Tavor TAR-21, a gas-operated assault rifle
- Leader Dynamics Series T2 MK5, a gas-operated assault rifle
- Barrett M82, a recoil-operated anti material rifle
- Ruger Mini-14, a gas-operated semi-automatic rifle
- IMI Desert Eagle, one of the few handguns with such mechanism
- Remington Model 8, a recoil-operated rifle
- Chauchat, a recoil-operated light machine gun
- Remington Model 7600, a pump-action rifle
- Winchester Model 88/Sako VL63 Finnwolf, a lever-action rifle with triple-lug rotating bolt
- Flint River Armory CSA45, a gas-operated large pistol caliber carbine
- SIG-Sauer MPX, a gas-operated submachine gun
- CMMG MkG, the first AR15 derivative to use radial delayed blowback operation
- Browning BAR, a semi-automatic rifle
- Browning BLR, a lever action rifle with a rotating bolt
- SA80, a gas-operated 5.56mm weapon family
- S&T Motiv K16, a gas-operated general purpose machine gun

== See also ==
- Roller locked
- Locked breech
- Tilting bolt
