= Sieg automatic rifle =

M1946 Sieg automatic rifle
- M1946 Sieg bullpup from a June 1946 article in Popular Science
- Type: Bullpup battle rifle
- Place of origin: United States

Production history
- Designer: James E. Sieg
- Designed: 1946
- No. built: 1 (prototype model)

Specifications
- Mass: 10 1/2 pounds (4.8 kg)
- Length: 36 inches (91 cm)
- Cartridge: .30-06 Springfield
- Action: Gas-operated
- Rate of fire: 650–700 rounds/min
- Feed system: 20-round detachable box magazine
- Sights: Iron sights

The Sieg automatic rifle was a bullpup automatic rifle designed by Chief Gunner's Mate James E. Sieg of the US Coast Guard. The weapon was chambered in the .30-06 round, fed from 20 round magazines and capable of firing around 650–700 RPM on full automatic. A two-finger double trigger selected between semiautomatic and fully automatic fire. The barrel came with a unique muzzle compensator that could be turned off for use with a flash hider or grenade launcher without interfering with the installation of a bayonet. Recoil gently threw the barrel of the Sieg rifle downward, not upward. When tested at Fort Benning, it had effective results. The compensator was extremely effective; it also enabled the user to fire the rifle with one hand.

Sieg obtained patent USPTO 2,451,514 for his compensator in 1948.

== See also ==
- Model 45A
- List of bullpup firearms
- List of battle rifles
