= Earthquake preparedness =

Measures taken to minimize the effect of earthquakes

Preparations for earthquakes can consist of survival measures, preparation that will improve survival in the event of an earthquake, or mitigating measures, that seek to minimise the effect of an earthquake. Common survival measures include storing food and water for an emergency and educating individuals what to do during an earthquake. Mitigating measures can include firmly securing large items of furniture (such as bookcases and large cabinets), TV and computer screens that may otherwise fall over in an earthquake. Likewise, avoiding storing items above beds or sofas reduces the chance of objects falling on individuals.

Planning for a related tsunami, tsunami preparedness, can also be part of earthquake preparedness.

== Building design and retrofitting ==
Seismic codes in earthquake prone areas may have specific requirements designed to increase new buildings' resistance to earthquakes. Older buildings and homes that are not up to code may be modified to increase their resistance. Modification and earthquake resistant design are also employed in elevated freeways and bridges.

Codes are not designed to make buildings earthquake proof in the sense of them suffering zero damage. The goal of most building designs is to reduce earthquake damage to a building such that it protects the lives of occupants and thus tolerance of some limited damage is accepted and considered a necessary trade-off. A supplement or precursor to retrofitting can be the implementation of earthquake-proof furniture.

Earthquake modification techniques and modern building codes are designed to prevent total destruction of buildings for earthquakes of no greater than 8.5 on the Richter Scale. Although the Richter Scale is referenced, the localized shaking intensity is one of the largest factors to be considered in building resiliency.

== Types of preparedness ==
The basic theme behind preparedness is to be ready for an earthquake. Preparedness starts with an individual's everyday life and involves items and training that would be useful in an earthquake. Preparedness continues on a continuum from individual preparedness through family preparedness, community preparedness and then business, non-profit and governmental preparedness. Some organisations blend these various levels. Business continuity planning encourages businesses to have a Disaster Recovery Plan. The US FEMA breaks down preparedness generally into a pyramid, with citizens on the foundational bottom, on top of which rests local government, state government and federal government in that order.

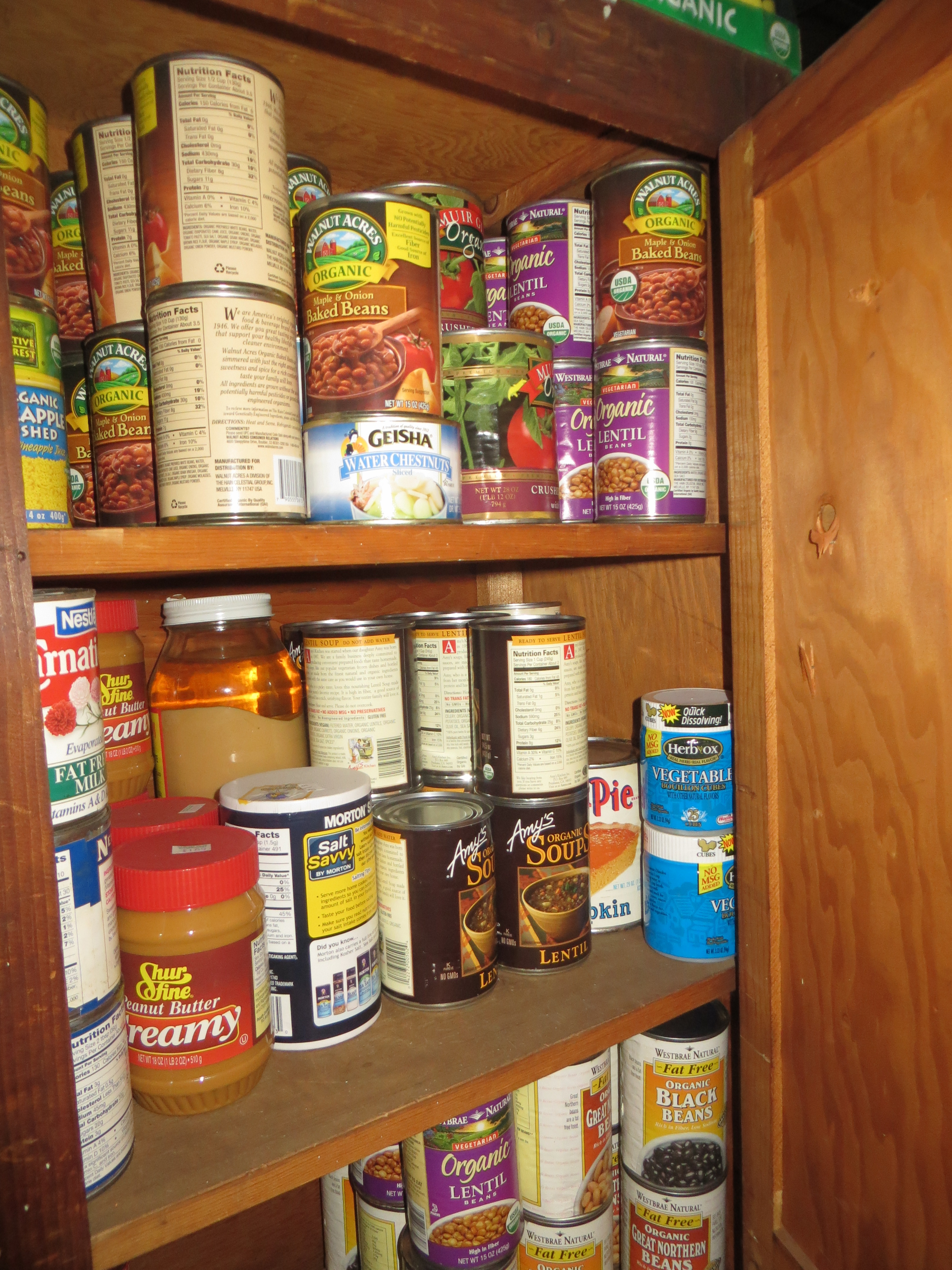
Non-perishable food in cabinet

Children may present particular issues and some planning and resources are directly focused on supporting them. The US FEMA has advice noting that "Disasters can leave children feeling frightened, confused, and insecure" whether a child has experienced it first hand, had it happen to a friend or simply seen it on television. People with disabilities or other special needs may have special emergency preparation needs. FEMA's suggestions for people with disabilities include having copies of prescriptions, charging devices for medical devices such as motorized wheel chairs and a week's supply of medication readily available. Preparedness can also cover pets.

Preparedness can also encompass psychological preparedness: resources are designed to support both community members affected by a disaster and the disaster workers serving them.

A multi-hazard approach, where communities are prepared for several hazards, are more resilient than single hazard approaches and have been gaining popularity.

Long term power outages can cause damage beyond the original disaster that can be mitigated with emergency generators or other power sources to provide an emergency power system. The United States Department of Energy states: "homeowners, business owners, and local leaders may have to take an active role in dealing with energy disruptions on their own." Major institutions like hospitals, military bases and educational institutions often have extensive backup power systems. Preparedness does not stop at home or at school. The United States Department of Health and Human Services addresses specific emergency preparedness issues hospitals may have to respond to, including maintaining a safe temperature, providing adequate electricity for life support systems and even carrying out evacuations under extreme circumstances. FEMA encourages all businesses to have an emergency response plan and the Small Business Administration specifically advises small business owners to also focus emergency preparedness and provides a variety of different worksheets and resources.

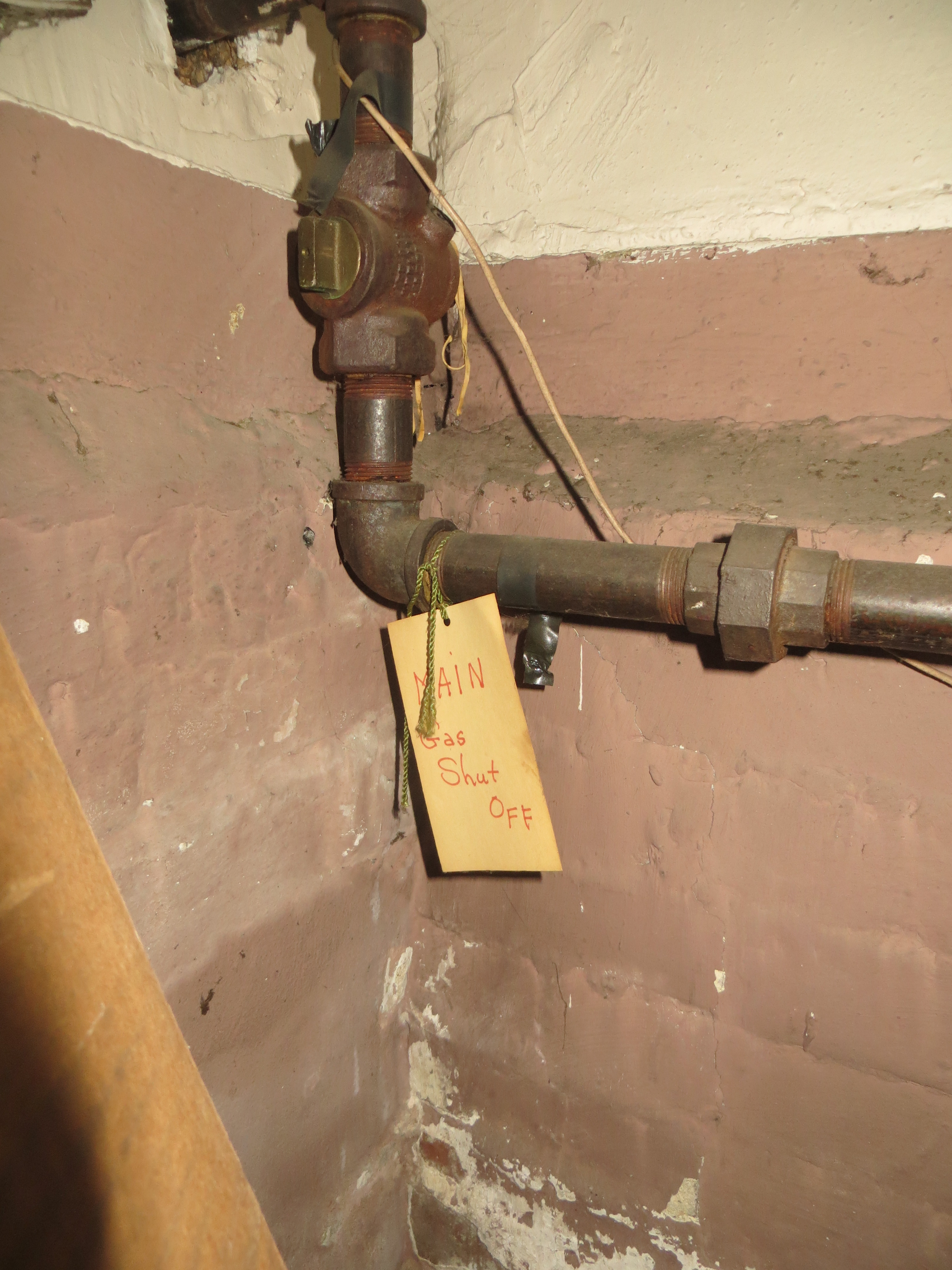
Marked gas shuttoff

Given the explosive danger posed by natural gas leaks, Ready.gov states that "It is vital that all household members know how to shut off natural gas" and that property owners must ensure they have any special tools needed for their particular gas connections. Ready.gov also notes that "It is wise to teach all responsible household members where and how to shut off the electricity," cautioning that individual circuits should be shut off before the main circuit. Ready.gov further states that "It is vital that all household members learn how to shut off the water at the main house valve" and cautions that the possibility that rusty valves might require replacement.

In museums and galleries, some types of waxes may be used to secure objects against earthquake damage.

== Achieving preparedness ==
Levels of preparedness generally remain low, despite attempts to increase public awareness.

Various methods exist to promote disaster preparedness, but they are rarely well documented and their efficacy is rarely tested. Hands on training, drills and face-to-face interaction have proven more successful at changing behaviour. Digital methods have also been used, including for examples educational videogames.

== See also ==
- HurriQuake
- Emergency management
