= HurriQuake =

Construction nail

The nail, as shown in the patent document.

The HurriQuake nail was a construction nail designed by Ed Sutt for Bostitch, a division of Stanley Works, and patented in 2004. The nail was designed primarily to provide more structural integrity for a building, especially against the forces of hurricanes and earthquakes.

The Hurriquake nail won the Popular Science Best of What's New 2006 award for Home Technology and Best Innovation of the Year. The Hurriquake nail was discontinued in 2011.

== Features ==
Detail of the barbed rings on the shank.

Starting at the bottom of the nail, the ring shanks on the lower half of it are enhanced with angular barbs, which, if being pulled out, add resistance to the nail. The middle of the nail has no extra features, which leaves the section most likely to be damaged during an earthquake thicker and less prone to damage. The area directly below the head of the nail features a spiral-style shank used to enhance the strength of the nail in holding boards together. This enhancement keeps boards that are nailed together from moving around under forces of nature and overall weakening the joints. The final feature of this nail is the nail head, which is 25% larger than the average, allowing it to be more resistant to being pulled completely through attached pieces of wood.

== Design ==
=== Pre-development ===
The nail's design began when its inventor, civil engineer Ed Sutt, traveled to the Caribbean in the wake of Hurricane Marilyn. Sutt's trip to the Caribbean was part of a team examining the wreckage of the 80% of the island's homes and businesses that had been destroyed in the hurricane's winds of 95 mph (153 km/h). The finding among the homes that had been destroyed was that wood failure was not the cause of destruction; instead, the findings showed that the nails holding the wood together had failed, leading to the buildings' ultimate collapse. Sutt's research began after taking a research assistantship program at the Clemson Wind Load Test Facility, which had received funding through a grant from FEMA. The grant was used to research wooden-framed structures and the relationship of their failure to wind velocity. The outcome of the project's research showed that the best way to strengthen a structure was to improve the fasteners that held the roofing and wall sheathing to the internal frame, and with this information, Sutt signed on as a fastener engineer for the Stanley subsidiary, Bostitch.

=== Development ===
As development began on the nail, there were three major causes of failure to be overcome. These were having the nail — head and all — rip through the sheathing, having the entire nail pull out of the frame, and having the nail's midsection snap under stress. Early research showed that the larger the head, the less chance there was of the nail being ripped through the sheathing. However, the difficult task was increasing the nail's head while still making it compatible with popular nail gun models. After finding the ideal nail head size, the next task to conquer was preventing the entire nail from pulling out of the frame. This was overcome by adding barbed ring shanks around the lower portion of the nail. During the testing of the shanks, it was noted that above a certain point the ridges no longer strengthened the nail but instead weakened the nail by making it more susceptible to shearing. The final touch to the original prototype was a special high-carbon alloy designed by a metallurgist that had the perfect combination of stiffness and pliability, giving it the highest possible strength.

=== Sheather plus and beyond ===
After analyzing hundreds of designs, and finally coming up with what was believed to be the best design, Bostich finally released the nail in 2005 and labeled it the Sheather Plus. Even though the new nail was stronger than most nails, the barbs, which added the much needed strength to the nail's holding power, weakened the strength of the joint by opening the hole too far. This caused the joint to be sloppy and wobbly, so the team went back to the drawing board where the final feature was added to the nail. To compensate for the extra width of the nail hole, due to the ring shanks, Sutt decided to add a thicker screw-shank to the portion of the nail directly under the head. This addition thickened the top portion of the nail giving it a tighter joint, as well as enhancing its overall holding power.

== Testing ==
Independent tests of the nail's stretch were conducted by several organizations, including Florida International University and the International Code Council. Those tests confirmed the claims by the researchers at Bostitch that they had created a better nail. Among all of the different tests, it was found that the new nail had twice the "uplift capacity" of other power driven nails, as well as increasing a home's resistance to wind and increasing earthquake resistance by up to 50%. For further testing, Sutt asked for the assistance of Scott Schiff, the coordinator of the graduate program in civil engineering and engineering mechanics at Clemson University. Tests at the Clemson Wind Load Test Facility confirmed what had already been stated. With equipment to simulate the force of winds, roofs attached with traditional nails were pulled apart at around 13,500 pounds of force (60.1 kN). At forces up to 16,000 pounds (71 kN), walls built with the HurriQuake environment nail showed minimal wall movement. As the pressure increased to 17,000 pounds (75 kN), then 18,000 (80 kN), then 19,000 (85 kN), the walls began to make creaking and groaning noises but they still stayed attached. As the test rig pushed 20,000 pounds (89 kN), the maximum it was capable of testing, it gave out, showing that the HurriQuake environment nail sustained 20,000 pounds of force (89 kN) and still was not sheared or completely pulled out.
