= New England Small Arms =

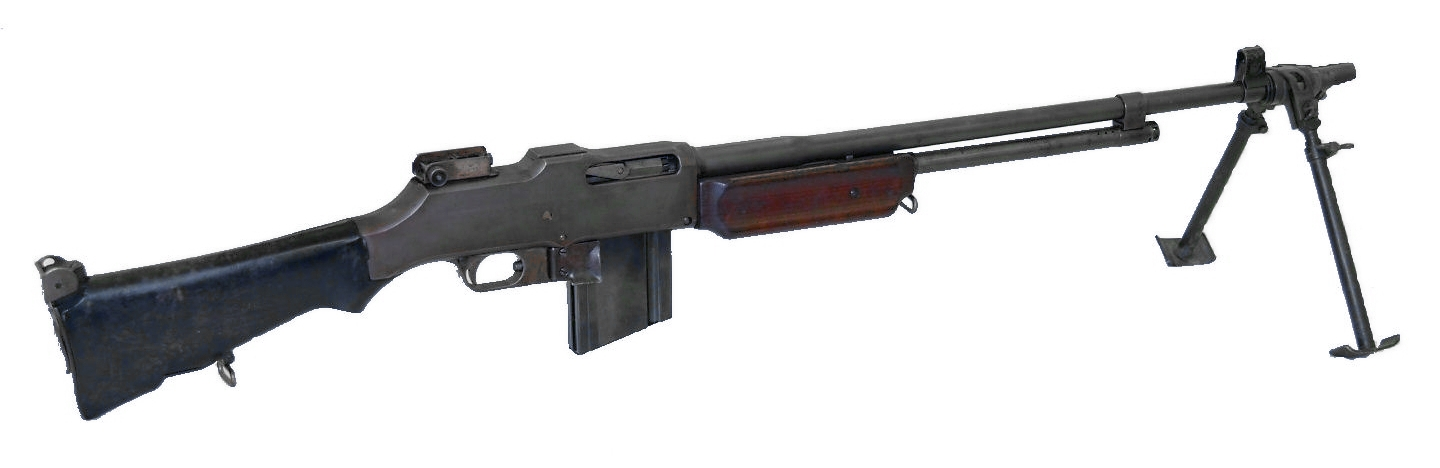
A Browning Automatic rifle manufactured by New England Small Arms Corporation.

New England Small Arms Corporation was a consortium of small manufacturers who coordinated their facilities for production of M1918 Browning Automatic Rifles during World War II. The company was an unusual variation of United States conversion of small manufacturing plants from civilian goods to military armaments production. Other manufacturers of this size typically produced firearm components on a subcontract basis for larger prime contractors responsible for assembly and delivery. Boston Wire Stitcher Company of East Greenwich, Rhode Island, A.G.Spalding & Brothers of Chicopee, Massachusetts, Blake Manufacturing Company of Clinton, Massachusetts, International Silver Company of Meriden, Connecticut, National Blank Book Company of Holyoke, Massachusetts, and Elliot Addressing Machine Company of Cambridge, Massachusetts distributed tooling used for M1918 rifle production during World War I by Winchester Repeating Arms and Marlin-Rockwell. Each company manufactured different rifle components and forwarded them for final assembly to a jointly operated facility converted to wartime arms production in Crompton, Rhode Island. The corporation was created for M1918 rifle production and dissolved as members of the consortium returned to pre-war production when wartime procurement contracts were canceled. The firm produced 188,380 M1918 rifles, or 90% of the total wartime production of 208,380.
