= Bostitch =

American fastening tools company

- Type: Subsidiary
- Industry: Manufacturing
- Founded: 1896
- Founder: Thomas Briggs
- Headquarters: East Greenwich, Rhode Island
- Products: Fastening tools
- Parent: Stanley Black & Decker
- Website: www.bostitch.com

Stanley Bostitch, previously and more commonly known as simply Bostitch, is an American company that specializes in the design and manufacture of fastening tools (such as staplers, staple guns, nailers, riveters, and glue guns) and fasteners (such as nails, screws, and staples). Its product range covers home, office, like the pencil sharpener, construction and industrial uses, like the power tool.

The company developed a number of improvements to what became the modern desk stapler. It is a subsidiary of Stanley Black & Decker. In August 2013, Stanley Black & Decker began selling tradesmen’s power tools and mechanics’ hand tools and pneumatic tools under the Bostitch brand at Walmart stores and online distributors.

== History ==
Bostitch was founded in Arlington, Massachusetts in 1896 by Thomas Briggs as the Boston Wire Stitcher Company. Briggs had invented a machine that stitched books from a coil of wire. The company began manufacturing various other kinds of staplers for industrial use.

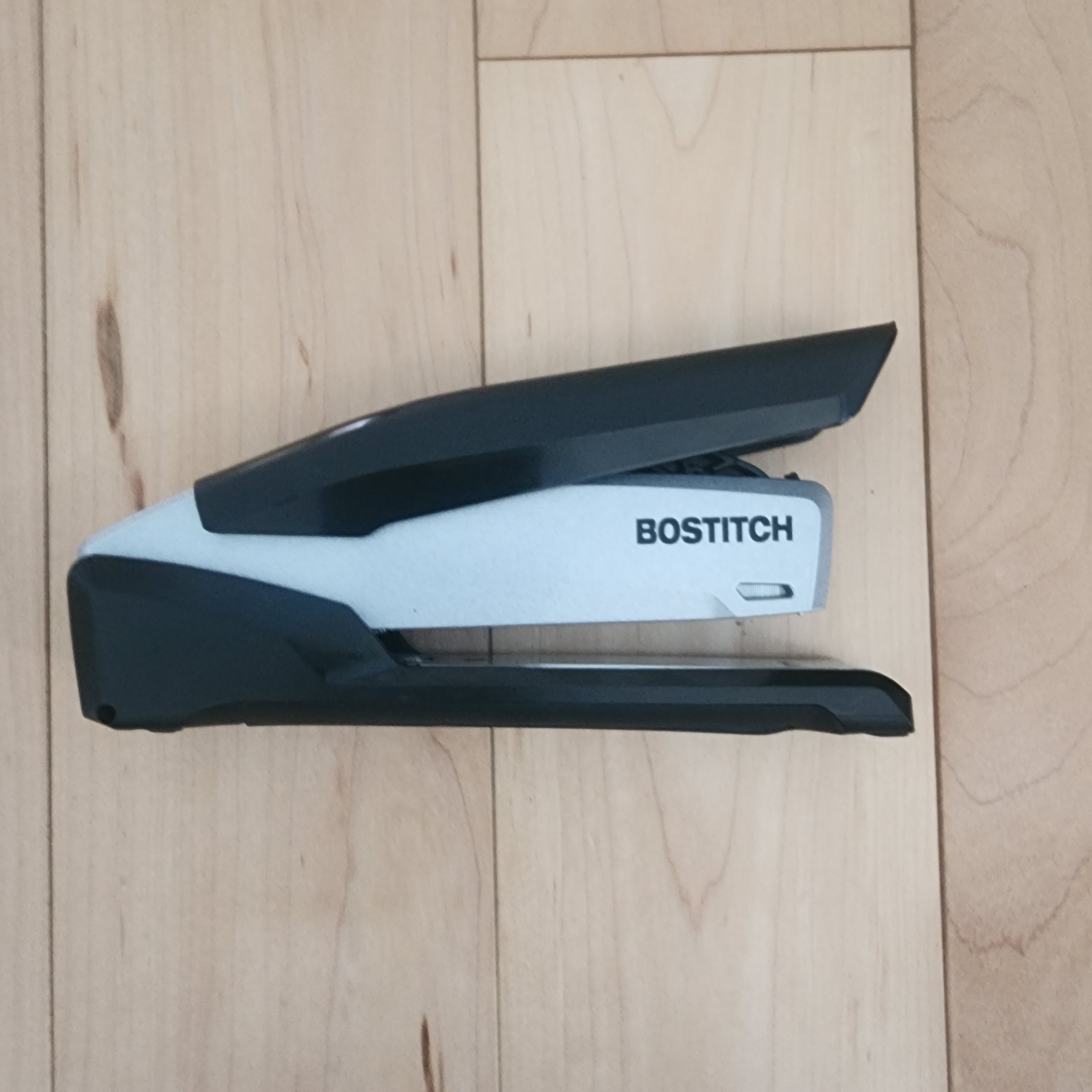
A Bostitch stapler on its side.

It largely focused on commercial stitching machines. However, in 1914, the company introduced its first "portable stapling machine", the Model AO, considered an ancestor of the modern desk stapler. In 1924, the company introduced the first stapler to use modern style cohered strip staples, the Bostitch No. 1.

This was a revolutionary design because it was inexpensive and reliable. During World War II, the company joined five other firms to form the New England Small Arms Corporation for manufacture of M1918 Browning Automatic Rifles. In 1948, the company officially changed its name to BOSTITCH, a portmanteau of "Boston" and "stitch". In 1957, the company moved from Westerly, Rhode Island to its current location in East Greenwich, Rhode Island.

In 1966, Textron purchased the company, and in January 1986 Stanley Works acquired the company from Textron.

== Trivia ==
In the German part of Switzerland, Bostitch became a commonly used deonym (pendant to eponym). The verb "bostitchen" is a synonym for stapling and is even used in official documents.
