= M1918 Browning automatic rifle =

United States automatic rifle family

Rifle, caliber .30, automatic, Browning, M1918
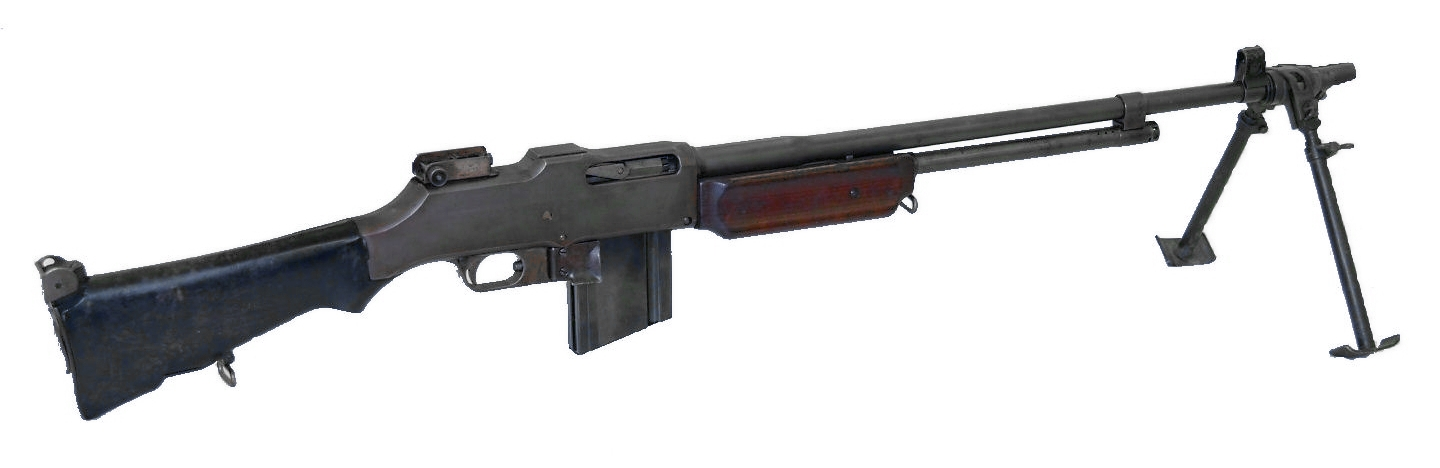
- The M1918A2 BAR
- Type: Light machine gun; Automatic rifle
- Place of origin: United States

Service history
- In service: 1918–1973 (United States)
- Used by: See § Users
- Wars: List of conflicts: World War I; Banana Wars; Cuban Revolution of 1933; Spanish Civil War; Second Sino-Japanese War; World War II; Chinese Civil War; Indonesian National Revolution; Greek Civil War; First Indochina War; Hukbalahap Rebellion; Palestinian Civil War; Korean War; Algerian War; Cypriot intercommunal violence; Cuban Revolution; Bay of Pigs Invasion; Vietnam War; Laotian Civil War; Cambodian Civil War; Moro conflict; Lebanese Civil War; Turkish invasion of Cyprus; Thai–Laotian Border War; Invasion of Panama; Gang war in Haiti

Production history
- Designer: John Browning
- Designed: 1917
- Manufacturer: List of manufacturers: Colt's Patent Firearms Manufacturing Company; Winchester Repeating Arms Company; Marlin-Rockwell Corporation; New England Small Arms; Royal McBee Typewriter Company; IBM; Carl Gustafs Stads Gevärsfaktori; Państwowa Fabryka Karabinów; FN Herstal
- Unit cost: $319
- Produced: 1917–1960 (original BAR only); 2013–present (HCAR)
- No. built: 351,554: M1918: 102,174; M1918A2: 249,380
- Variants: See § Variants

Specifications (U.S. BARs (Note: US M1918, M1922, M1918A1 and M1918A2 automatic rifles.))
- Mass: 7.25 kg (15.98 lb) (M1918); approx. 11 kg (24 lb) (M1922); 8.4 kg (19 lb) (M1918A1); 8.8 kg (19 lb) (M1918A2)
- Length: 1,194 mm (47.0 in) (M1918, M1922, M1918A1); 1,215 mm (47.8 in) (M1918A2)
- Barrel length: 610 mm (24.0 in)
- Cartridge: 7.62×63mm (.30-06 Springfield)
- Action: Gas-operated, long-stroke gas piston, rising bolt lock
- Rate of fire: 500–650 rounds/min (M1918, M1922, M1918A1); 300–450 or 500–650 rounds/min (M1918A2)
- Muzzle velocity: 860 m/s (2,822 ft/s)
- Effective firing range: 100–1,500 yards (91–1,372 m) sight adjustments (maximum effective range)
- Maximum firing range: approx. 4,500–5,000 yards (4,100–4,600 m)
- Feed system: 20-round detachable box magazine (7oz empty; 1lb, 7oz full); 40-round detachable box magazine (14 oz empty; 2lb 7oz full. Used for anti-aircraft)
- Sights: Rear leaf, front post; 784 mm (30.9 in) sight radius (M1918, M1922, M1918A1); 782 mm (30.8 in) (M1918A2)

The Browning automatic rifle (BAR) is a family of American automatic rifle used by the United States and numerous other countries during the 20th century. The primary variant of the BAR series was the M1918, chambered for the .30-06 Springfield rifle cartridge and designed by John Browning in 1917 for the American Expeditionary Forces in Europe as a replacement for the French-made Chauchat and M1909 Benét–Mercié machine guns that U.S. forces had previously been issued.

The BAR was designed to be carried by infantrymen during an assault advance while supported by the sling over the shoulder, or to be fired from the hip. This is a concept called "walking fire"—thought to be necessary for the individual soldier during trench warfare. The BAR never entirely lived up to the original hopes of the War Department as either a rifle or a machine gun.

The U.S. Army, in practice, used the BAR as a light machine gun, often fired from a bipod (introduced on models after 1938). A variant of the original M1918 BAR, the Colt Monitor machine rifle, remains the lightest production automatic firearm chambered for the .30-06 Springfield cartridge, though the limited capacity of its standard 20-round magazine tended to hamper its utility in that role.

Although the weapon did see action in late 1918 during World War I, the BAR did not become standard issue in the U.S. Army until 1938, when it was issued to squads as a portable light machine gun. The BAR saw extensive service in both World War II and the Korean War and saw limited service in the Vietnam War. The U.S. Army began phasing out the BAR in the 1950s, when it was intended to be replaced by a squad automatic weapon (SAW) variant of the M14, and as a result the U.S. Army was without a portable light machine gun until the introduction of the M60 machine gun in 1957.

== History ==
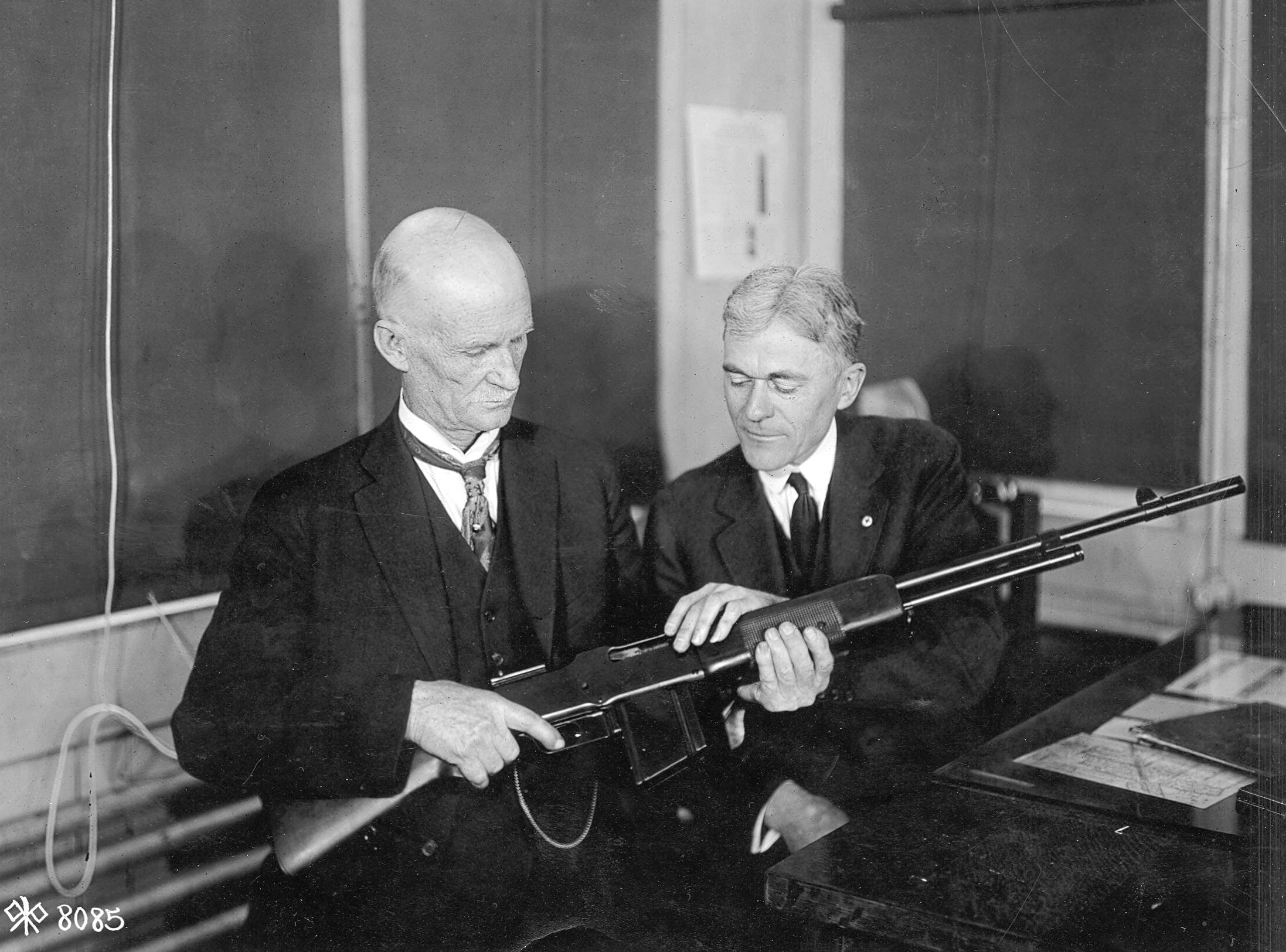
John M. Browning, the inventor of the rifle, and Frank F. Burton, the Winchester expert on rifles, discussing the finer points of the BAR at the Winchester plant

The U.S. entered World War I with an inadequate, small, and obsolete assortment of domestic and foreign machine gun designs, due primarily to bureaucratic indecision and the lack of an established military doctrine for their employment. When the United States declaration of war on Germany was announced on 6 April 1917, the high command was made aware that to fight this trench war, dominated by machine-guns, they had on hand a mere 670 M1909 Benét–Merciés, 282 M1904 Maxims and 158 Colt-Browning M1895s. After much debate, it was finally agreed that a rapid rearmament with domestic weapons would be required, but until that time, U.S. troops would be issued whatever the French and British had to offer. The arms donated by the French were often second-rate or surplus and chambered in 8mm Lebel, further complicating logistics as machine gunners and infantrymen were issued different types of ammunition.

=== Development ===
Browning began to design the weapon later known as the BAR in 1910. He demonstrated the prototypes to the U.S. military, which did not see an immediate use for the weapon until 1917.

In 1917, prior to America's entry to the war, John Browning personally brought to Washington, D.C. two types of automatic weapons for the purposes of demonstration: a water-cooled machine gun (later adopted as the M1917 Browning machine gun) and a shoulder-fired automatic rifle known then as the Browning Machine Rifle or BMR, both chambered for the standard U.S. .30-06 Springfield (7.62×63mm) cartridge. Colt and the Ordnance Department arranged for a public demonstration of both weapons at a location in southern Washington, D.C. known as Congress Heights. There, on 27 February 1917, in front of a crowd of 300 people (including high-ranking military officials, congressmen, senators, foreign dignitaries and the press), the Army staged a live-fire demonstration which so impressed the gathered crowd, that Browning was immediately awarded a contract for the weapon and it was hastily adopted into service (the water-cooled machine gun underwent further testing).

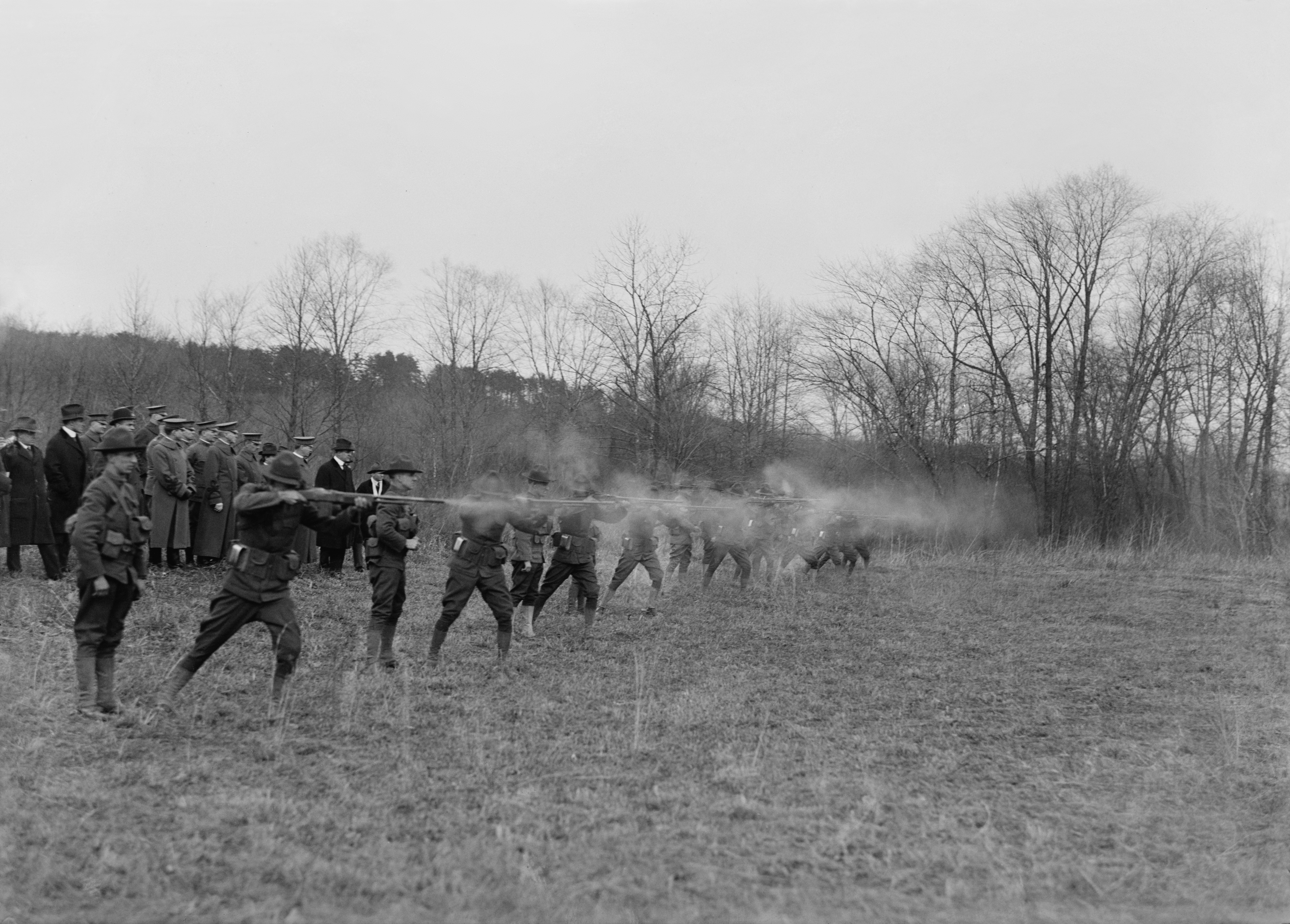
A live-fire demonstration of the Browning Automatic Rifle conducted for military and government officials.

Additional tests were conducted for U.S. Army Ordnance officials at Springfield Armory in May 1917, and both weapons were unanimously recommended for immediate adoption. In order to avoid confusion with the belt-fed M1917 machine gun, the BAR came to be known as the M1918 or Rifle, Caliber .30, Automatic, Browning, M1918 according to official nomenclature. On 16 July 1917, 12,000 BARs were ordered from Colt's Patent Firearms Manufacturing Company, which had secured an exclusive concession to manufacture the BAR under Browning's patents (Browning's U.S. patent 1,293,022 was owned by Colt). However Colt was already producing at peak capacity (contracted to manufacture the Vickers machine gun for the British Army) and requested a delay in production while they expanded their manufacturing output with a new facility in Meriden, Connecticut. Due to the urgent need for the weapon, the request was denied and the Winchester Repeating Arms Company (WRAC) was designated as the prime contractor. Winchester gave valuable assistance in refining the BAR's final design, correcting the drawings in preparation for mass production. Among the changes made, the ejection pattern was modified (spent cases were directed to the right side of the weapon instead of straight up).

=== Initial M1918 production ===
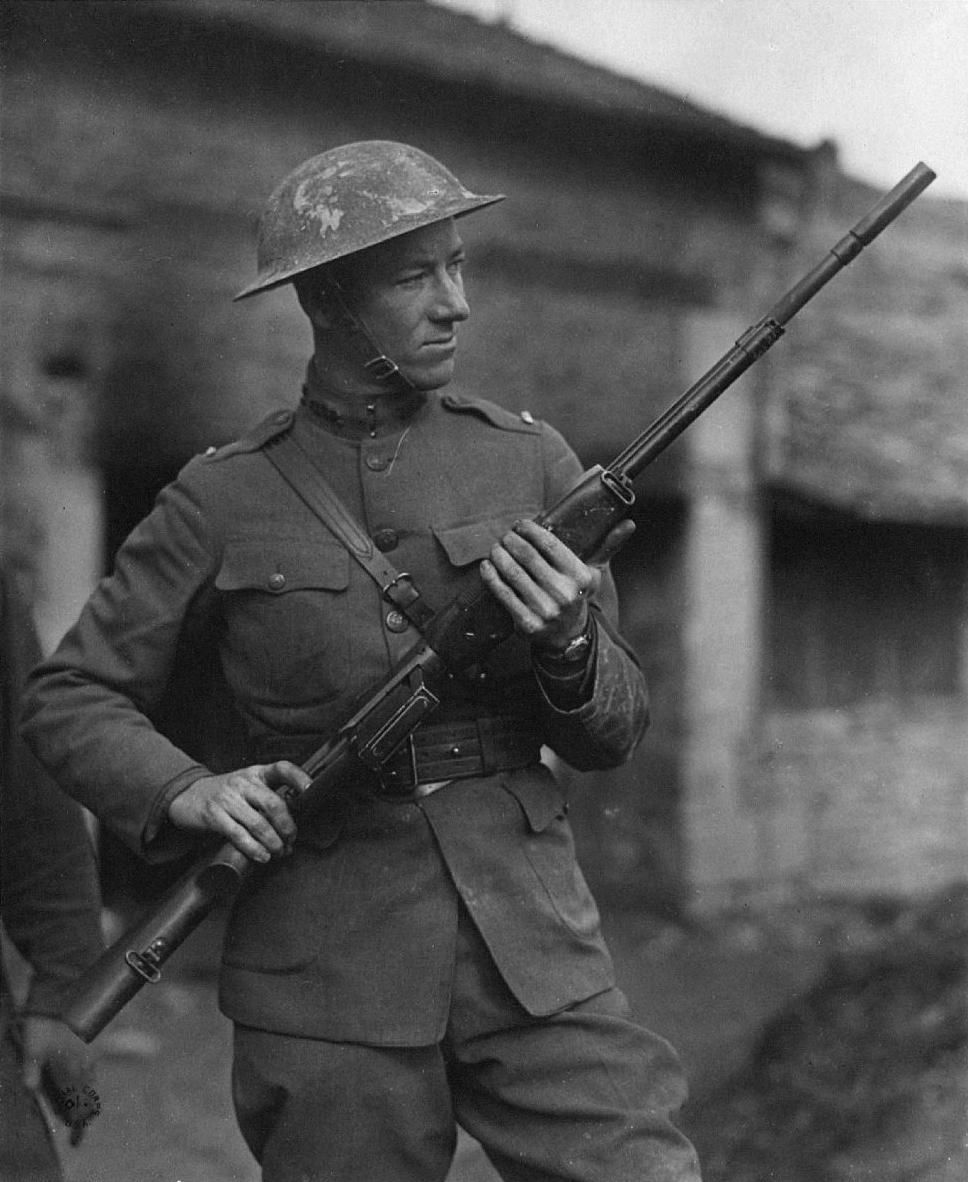
Portrait photograph of 2nd Lt. Val A. Browning holding a Browning Automatic Rifle while in France.

Since work on the weapon did not begin until February 1918, so hurried was the schedule at Winchester to bring the BAR into full production that the first production batch of 1,800 rifles was delivered out of spec; it was discovered that many components did not interchange between rifles, and production was temporarily halted until manufacturing procedures were upgraded to bring the weapon up to specifications. The initial contract with Winchester called for 25,000 BARs. They were in full production by June 1918, delivering 4,000 units, and from July were turning out 9,000 units per month.

Colt and Marlin-Rockwell Corp. also began production shortly after Winchester got into full production. Marlin-Rockwell, burdened by a contract to make rifles for the Belgian government, acquired the Mayo Radiator Co.'s factory and used it exclusively to carry out production of the BAR. The first unit from this source was delivered on 11 June 1918 and the company's peak output reached 200 automatic rifles per day. Colt had produced only 9,000 BARs by the time of the armistice due to the heavy demands of previous orders. These three companies produced a combined daily output of 706 rifles and a total of approximately 52,000 BARs were delivered by all sources by the end of the war. Between 1918 and 1919, 102,174 BARs had been manufactured jointly by Colt, Winchester, and Marlin-Rockwell.

By July 1918, the BAR had begun to arrive in France, and the first unit to receive them was the U.S. Army's 79th Infantry Division, which took them into action for the first time on 13 September 1918. The weapon was personally demonstrated against the enemy by 2nd Lt. Val Allen Browning, the inventor's son. Despite being introduced very late in the war, the BAR made an impact disproportionate to its numbers; it was used extensively during the Meuse–Argonne offensive and made a significant impression on the Allies (France alone requested 15,000 automatic rifles to replace their Chauchat machine rifles).

The U.S. Marines briefly took possession of the BAR. Troops from the First Battalion of the Sixth Marines had talked the "doggies" of the U.S. Army's 36th Division into trading their BARs for their Chauchats. However, complaints from officers of the 36th resulted in the issuance of a command from Marine Lt. Col. Harry Lee on 9 October 1918: All Browning guns and equipment in Marine possession were to be turned in.

== Design details and accessories ==
The M1918 is a selective-fire, air-cooled automatic rifle using a gas-operated, long-stroke piston rod actuated by propellant gases bled through a vent in the barrel. The bolt is locked by a rising bolt lock. The weapon fires from an open bolt. The spring-powered cartridge case extractor is contained in the bolt and a fixed ejector is installed in the trigger group. The BAR is striker-fired (the bolt carrier serves as the striker) and uses a trigger mechanism with a fire selector lever that enables operating in either semi-automatic or fully automatic firing modes. The selector lever is located on the left side of the receiver and is simultaneously the manual safety (selector lever in the "S" position – weapon is safe, "A" – automatic fire, "F" – semi-automatic fire). The "safe" setting blocks the trigger from operating. The A2 variant changed the function of the fire selector, leaving "A" for automatic fire at the normal (full) cyclic rate, and changing "F" to automatic fire at a reduced (and more controllable) cyclic rate.

The weapon's barrel is screwed into the receiver and is not quickly detachable. The M1918 feeds using double-column 20-round box magazines, although 40-round magazines were also used in an anti-aircraft role; these were withdrawn from use in 1927. The M1918 has a cylindrical flash suppressor fitted to the muzzle end. The original BAR was equipped with a fixed wooden buttstock and closed-type adjustable iron sights taken from the Enfield 1917, consisting of a forward post and a rear leaf sight with 100 to 1,500 yards (91 to 1,372 metres) range graduations. As a heavy automatic rifle designed for support fire, the M1918 was not fitted with a bayonet mount and no bayonet was ever issued, though one experimental bayonet fitting was made by Winchester.

== Subsequent models ==
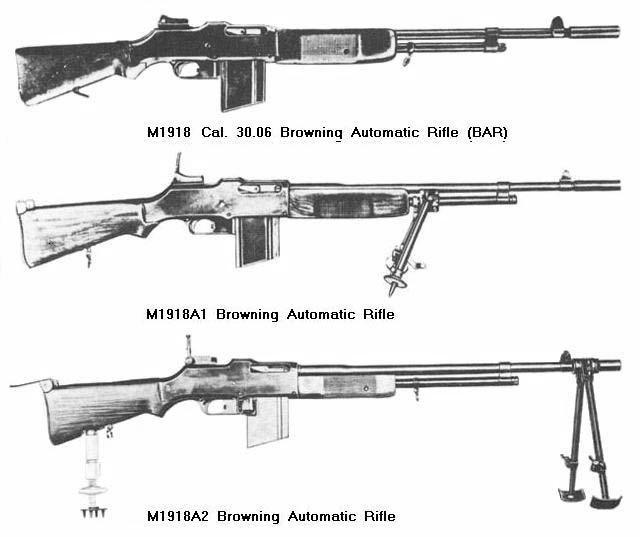
The primary U.S. M1918 variants

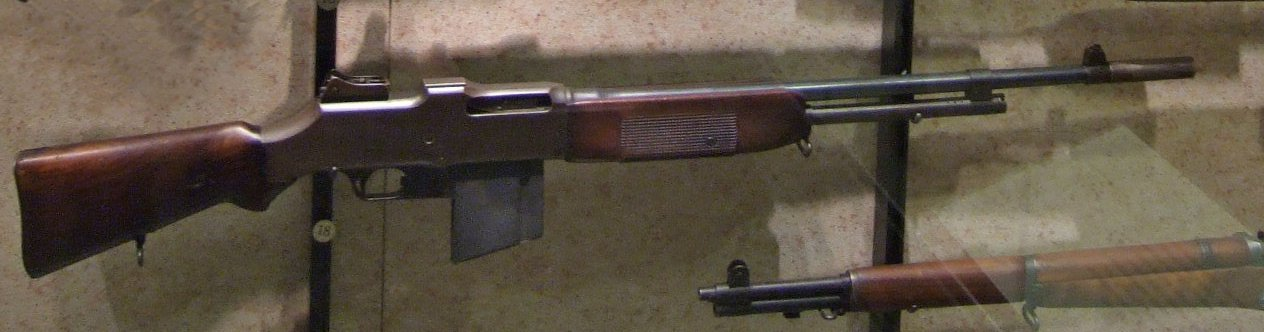
The early M1918 Browning Automatic Rifle.

During its lengthy service life, the BAR underwent continuous development, receiving many improvements and modifications. The first major attempt at improving the M1918 resulted in the M1922 machine rifle, adopted by the United States Cavalry in 1922 as a troop-level light machine gun. The weapon used a new heavy profile ribbed barrel, an adjustable spiked bipod (mounted to a swiveling collar on the barrel) with a rear, stock-mounted monopod, a side-mounted sling swivel and a new rear buttplate, fixed to the stock retaining sleeve. The hand guard was changed, and in 1926 the BAR's sights were redesigned to accommodate the heavy-bullet 172-grain M1 .30-06 ball ammunition then coming into service for machinegun use.

In 1932, a greatly shortened version was developed, the "BAR, cal. .30, M1918 (modified)" better known as the "jungle BAR" designed for bush and jungle warfare was developed by USMC Maj. H.L. Smith and was the subject of an evaluative report by Capt. Merritt A. Edson, ordnance officer at the Quartermaster's Depot in Philadelphia, Pennsylvania. The barrel was shortened nine inches (230 mm) at the muzzle and the gas port and gas cylinder tube were relocated. The modified BAR weighed 13 lb 12 oz (6.24 kg) and was only 34.5 inches (880 mm) long overall. Though it proved superior to the M1918 in accuracy when fired prone in automatic mode and equal in accuracy to the standard M1918 at ranges of 500–600 yards (460–550 metres) from a rest, it was less accurate when fired from the shoulder, and had a loud report combined with a fierce muzzle blast. Attaching a Cutts compensator materially reduced the muzzle blast, but this was more than offset by the increase in smoke and dust at the muzzle when fired, obscuring the operator's vision. Nor did it improve control of the weapon when fired in bursts of automatic fire. Though the report recommended building six of these short-barreled jungle BARs for further evaluation, no further work was done on the project.

The M1918A1, featuring a lightweight spiked bipod with a leg height adjustment feature attached to the gas cylinder and a hinged steel butt plate, was formally approved on 24 June 1937. The M1918A1 was intended to increase the weapon's effectiveness and controllability firing in bursts. Relatively few M1918s were rebuilt to the new M1918A1 standard.

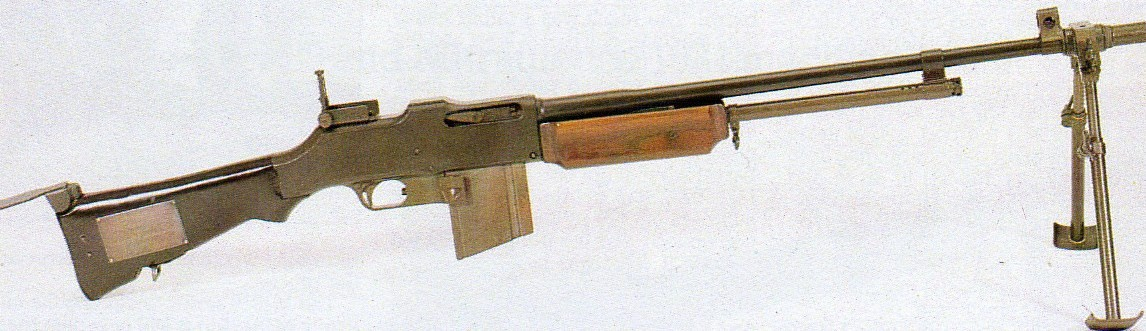
Browning Automatic Rifle M1918A2 with bipod and carrying handle, shown in profile.

In April 1938, work commenced on an improved BAR for the U.S. Army. The army specified a need for a BAR designed to serve in the role of a light machine gun for squad-level support fire. Early prototypes were fitted with barrel-mounted bipods as well as pistol grip housings and a unique rate-of-fire reducer mechanism purchased from FN Herstal. The rate reducer mechanism performed well in trials, and the pistol grip housing enabled the operator to fire more comfortably from the prone position. However, in 1939 the army declared that all modifications to the basic BAR be capable of being retrofitted to earlier M1918 guns with no loss of parts interchangeability. This effectively killed the FN-designed pistol grip and its proven rate reducer mechanism for the new M1918 replacement.

The final development of the M1918A2 was authorized on 30 June 1938. The FN-designed pistol grip and rate-reducer mechanism with two rates of automatic fire was shelved in favor of a rate-reducer mechanism designed by Springfield Armory, and housed in the butt stock. The Springfield Armory rate reducer also provided two selectable rates of fully automatic fire only, activated by engaging the selector toggle. Additionally, a skid-footed bipod was fitted to the muzzle end of the barrel, magazine guides were added to the front of the trigger guard, the hand guard was shortened, a heat shield was added to help the cooling process, a small separate stock rest (monopod) was included for attachment to the butt and the weapon's role was changed to that of a squad light machine gun. The BAR's rear sight scales were also modified to accommodate the newly standardized M2 ball ammunition with its lighter, flat-base bullet. The M1918A2's walnut butt stock is approximately one inch (2.5 cm) longer than the M1918 BAR's butt stock. The M1918A2's barrel was also fitted with a new flash suppressor and fully adjustable iron sights. Towards the end of the war a barrel-mounted carrying handle was added.

Because of budget limitations initial M1918A2 production consisted of conversions of older M1918 BARs (remaining in surplus) along with a limited number of M1922s and M1918A1s. After the outbreak of war, attempts to ramp up new M1918A2 production were stymied by the discovery that the World War I tooling used to produce the M1918 was either worn out or incompatible with modern production machinery. New production was first undertaken at the New England Small Arms Corp. and International Business Machines Corp. (a total of 188,380 new weapons were manufactured). In 1942 a shortage of black walnut for butt stocks and grips led to the development of a black plastic butt stock for the BAR. Composed of a mixture of Bakelite and Resinox, and impregnated with shredded fabric, the stocks were sandblasted to reduce glare. The Firestone Rubber and Latex Products Co. produced the plastic butt stock for the U.S. Army, which was formally adopted on March 21, 1942. The M1922 machine rifle was declared obsolete in 1940, but they were used by Merrill's Marauders in Burma later in the war as a slightly lighter alternative to the M1918A2.

Production rates greatly increased in 1943, after IBM introduced a method of casting BAR receivers from a new type of malleable iron developed by the Saginaw division of General Motors, called ArmaSteel. After it successfully passed a series of tests at Springfield Armory, the Chief of Ordnance instructed other BAR receiver manufacturers to change over from steel to ArmaSteel castings for this part. During the Korean War M1918A2 production was resumed, this time contracted to the Royal McBee Typewriter Co., which produced an additional 61,000 M1918A2s.

A bullpup prototype existed as the Cook automatic rifle during the 1950s. It was developed at Benicia Armoury by U.S. Army ordnance officer Lauren C. Cook. It used the gas operation of the M1918 BAR with the trigger group in front of the magazine. The operation fired from a closed bolt. The Cook automatic rifle was 30 inches retaining the barrel length of 18 inches.

The last U.S.-made variant was produced in 7.62×51mm NATO, as T34 Automatic rifle.

== Commercial models ==
=== Early export models ===
The BAR also found a ready market overseas and in various forms was widely exported. In 1919 the Colt company developed and produced a commercial variant called the Automatic Machine Rifle Model 1919 (company designation: Model U), which has a different return mechanism compared to the M1918 (it is installed in the stock rather than the gas tube) and lacks a flash hider. Later the Model 1924 rifle was offered for a short period of time, featuring a pistol grip and a redesigned hand guard. These Colt automatic rifles were available in a number of calibers, including .30-06 Springfield (7.62×63mm), 7.65×53mm Belgian Mauser, 7×57mm Mauser, 6.5×55mm, 7.92×57mm Mauser and .303 British (7.7×56mmR). All of the 6.5×55mm-caliber Colt automatic rifles appear to have been sold directly to FN.

=== Colt Monitor ===
Colt Monitor
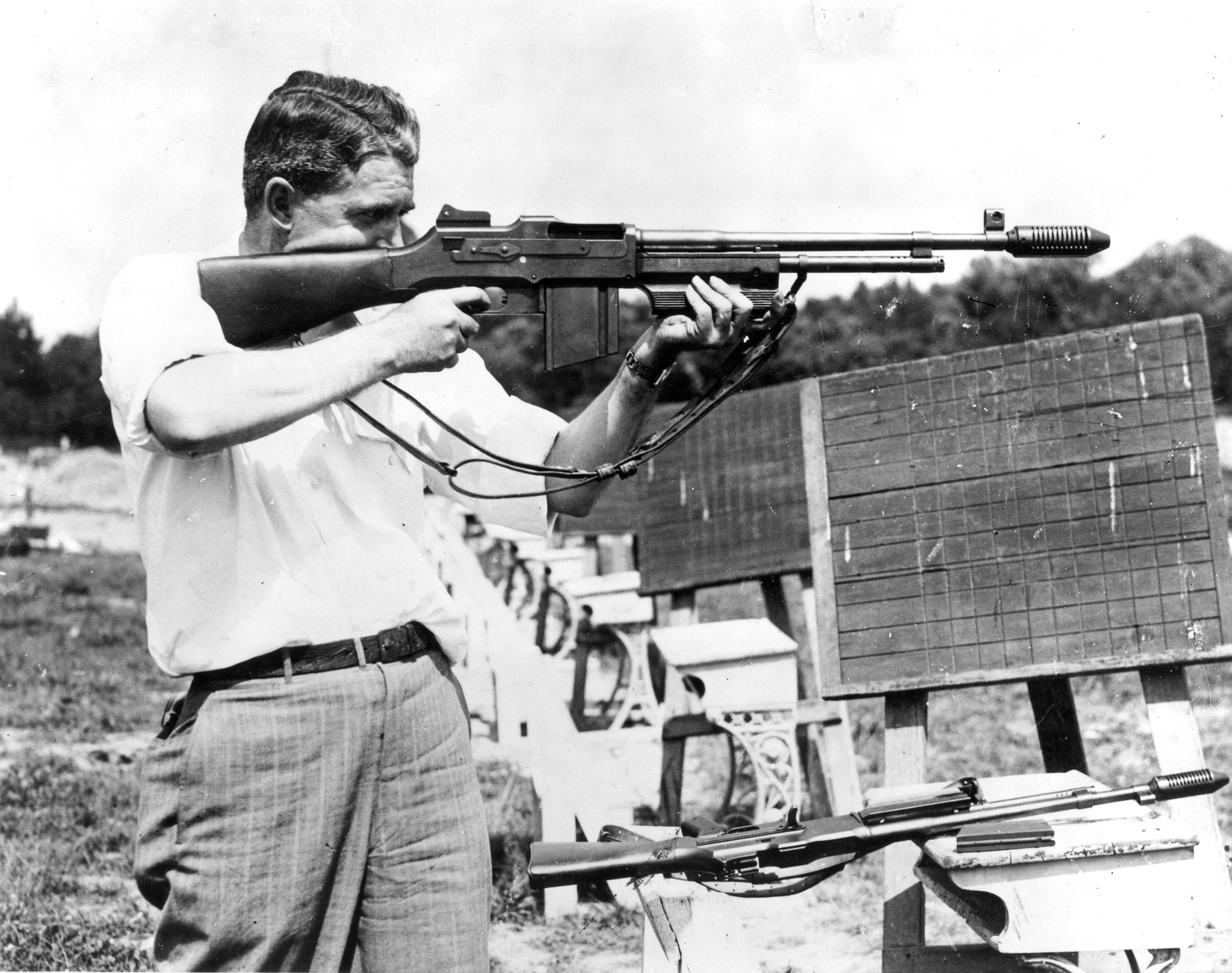
- An FBI special agent practices with the Colt Monitor (R 80). The Monitor had a separate pistol grip and long, slotted Cutts recoil compensator.
- Place of origin: United States

Production history
- Manufacturer: Colt's Patent Firearms Manufacturing Company
- No. built: 125

Specifications
- Mass: Empty: 6.0 kg (13.2 lb)
- Barrel length: 458 mm (18.0 in)
- Cartridge: 7.62×63mm (.30-06 Springfield); 7.65×53mm Belgian Mauser; 7×57mm Mauser; 7.92×57mm Mauser; 7.7×56mmR (.303 British)
- Action: Gas-operated, rising bolt lock
- Rate of fire: 500 Rounds/min
- Feed system: 20-round detachable box magazine

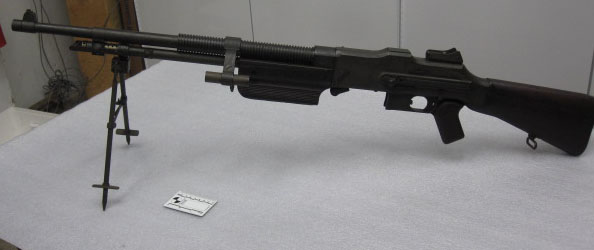
Colt R75A.

An improved version of the Model 1924, the Model 1925 (R75), achieved the highest popularity in export sales. It is based on the Model 1924 but uses a heavy, finned barrel, a lightweight bipod and is equipped with dust covers in the magazine well and ejection port (some of these features were patented: U.S. patents #1548709 and #1533968). The Model 1925 was produced in various calibers, including .30-06 Springfield (7.62×63mm), 7.65×53mm Belgian Mauser, 7×57mm Mauser, 7.92×57mm Mauser, and .303 British (7.7×56mmR) (no Colt-manufactured Model 1925 rifles in 6.5×55mm appear to have been sold). A minor variant of the Model 1925 (R75) was the R75A light machine gun with a quick-change barrel (produced in 1942 in small quantities for the Dutch army). Between 1921 and 1928 FN Herstal imported over 800 Colt-manufactured examples of the Colt Machine Rifles for sale abroad.

All of the Colt automatic machine rifles, including the Colt Monitor, were available for export sale. After 1929 the Model 1925 and the Colt Monitor were available for export sale in Colt's exclusive sales territories per its agreement with FN. These Colt territories included North America, Central America, the West Indies, South America, Great Britain, Russia, Turkey, Siam (Thailand), India and Australia.

In 1931, the Colt Arms Co. introduced the Monitor Automatic Machine Rifle (R80), intended primarily for use by prison guards and law-enforcement agencies. Intended for use as a shoulder-fired automatic rifle, the Monitor omitted the bipod, instead featuring a separate pistol grip and butt stock attached to a lightweight receiver, along with a shortened, 458 mm (18.0 in), barrel fitted with a 4-inch (100 mm) Cutts compensator. Weighing 16 lb 3 oz (7.34 kg) empty, the Monitor had a rate of fire of approximately 500 rpm. Around 125 were produced; 90 were purchased by the FBI. Eleven went to the U.S. Treasury Department in 1934, while the rest went to various state prisons, banks, security companies and accredited police departments. Although available for export sale, no examples appear to have been exported.

== International models ==
=== Belgium ===
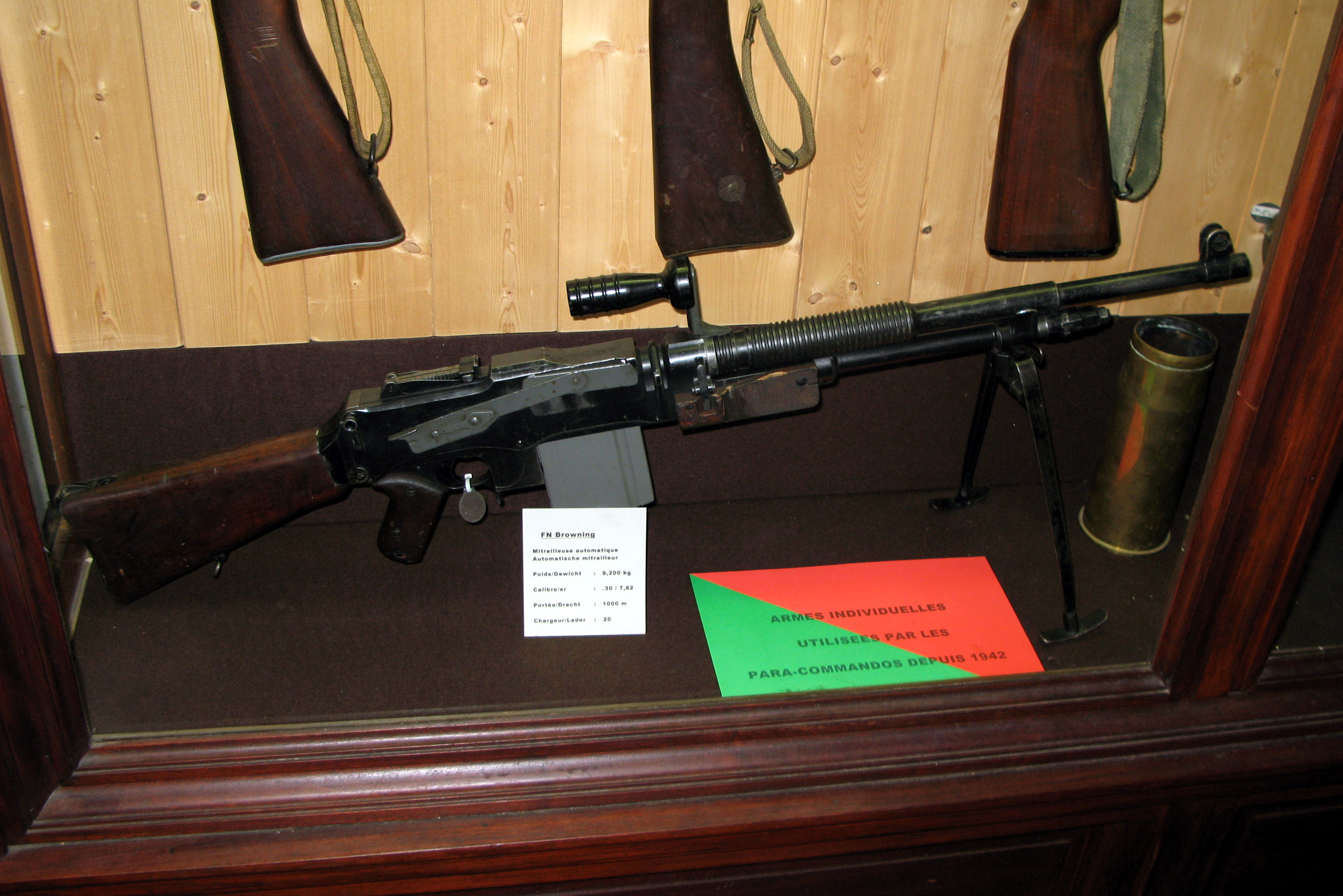
FN Model D light machine gun with bipod and quick-change barrel.

A variant known as the FN Modèle 1930 (or FN M^{le} 1930) was developed in 7.65×53mm Belgian Mauser by FN Herstal and adopted by the Belgian army. The FN M^{le} 1930 is basically a licensed copy of the Colt Automatic Machine Rifle, Model 1925 (R 75). The Mle 1930 has a different gas valve and a mechanical rate-reducing fire control mechanism designed by Dieudonné Saive, located in the trigger guard-pistol grip housing. Some of these FN rate reducer mechanisms and pistol grip housings were later purchased by Springfield Armory for evaluation and possible adoption on a replacement for the M1918. The weapon also had a hinged shoulder plate and was adapted for use on a tripod mount.

In 1932, Belgium adopted a new version of the FN M^{le} 1930 allocated the service designation FN Modèle D (D—demontable or "removable"), which had a quick-change barrel, shoulder rest and a simplified take-down method for easier cleaning and maintenance. The barrel used a ratchet that served double duty as a handle for both the hot barrel and the gun as a whole. The Mle D was produced even after World War II in versions adapted for .30-06 Springfield (for Belgian service) and 7.92×57mm Mauser ammunition (for Egyptian service). The final variant in Belgian service was the Model DA1 chambered for the 7.62×51mm NATO cartridge and feeding from the 20-round magazines for the FN FAL battle rifle.

=== France ===
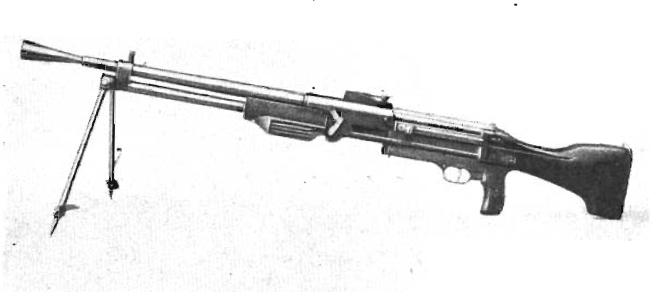
MAS Model 1922, a French prototype based on the Browning Automatic Rifle.

In 1922, the French Army considered the introduction of the BAR or of the Fusil-mitrailleur MAS modèle 1922, a copy of the BAR produced by the Manufacture d'armes de Saint-Étienne. The FM 24/29 light machine gun was eventually adopted. Despite not being adopted, it received the German designation l.MG 117(f).

=== Poland ===
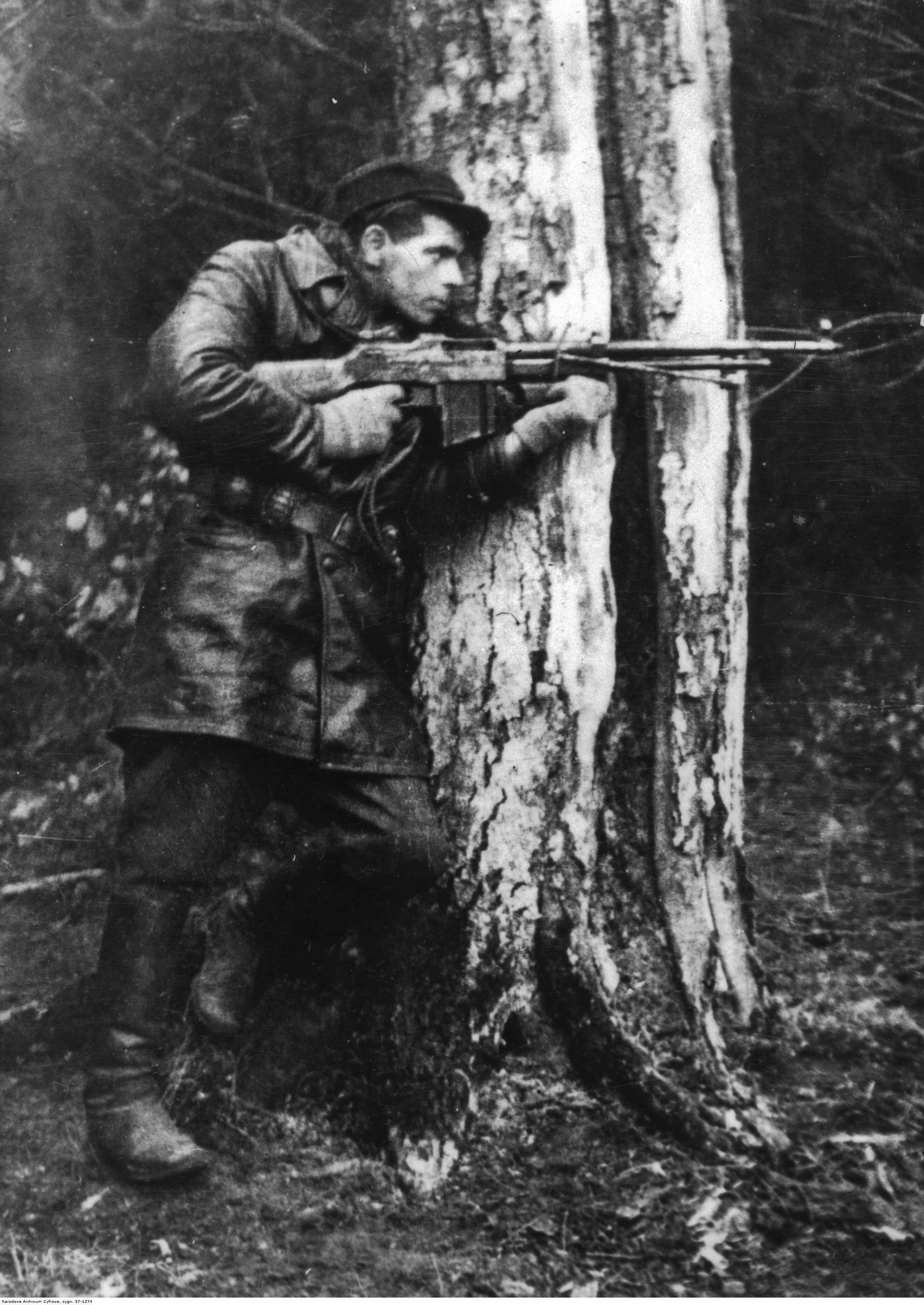
Polish partisan member of Jędrusie unit with Polish version of the M1918 BAR during World War II

Production of the BAR in Belgium began only after signing an agreement with Poland (on 10 December 1927) involving the procurement of 10,000 wz. 1928 light machine guns chambered in 7.92×57mm Mauser, which are similar to the R75 variant but designed specifically to meet the requirements of the Polish army. Changes to the base design include a pistol grip, different type of bipod, open-type V-notch rear sight and a slightly longer barrel. Subsequent rifles were assembled in Poland under license by the state rifle factory (Państwowa Fabryka Karabinów) in Warsaw. The wz. 1928 was accepted into service with the Polish army in 1927 under the formal name 7,92 mm rkm Browning wz. 1928 and—until the outbreak of World War II—was the primary light support weapon of Polish infantry and cavalry formations (in 1939 Poland had a total of approximately 20,000 wz. 1928 rifles in service). Additional detail modifications were introduced on the production line; among them were the replacement of the iron sights with a smaller version and reshaping the butt to a fish tail.

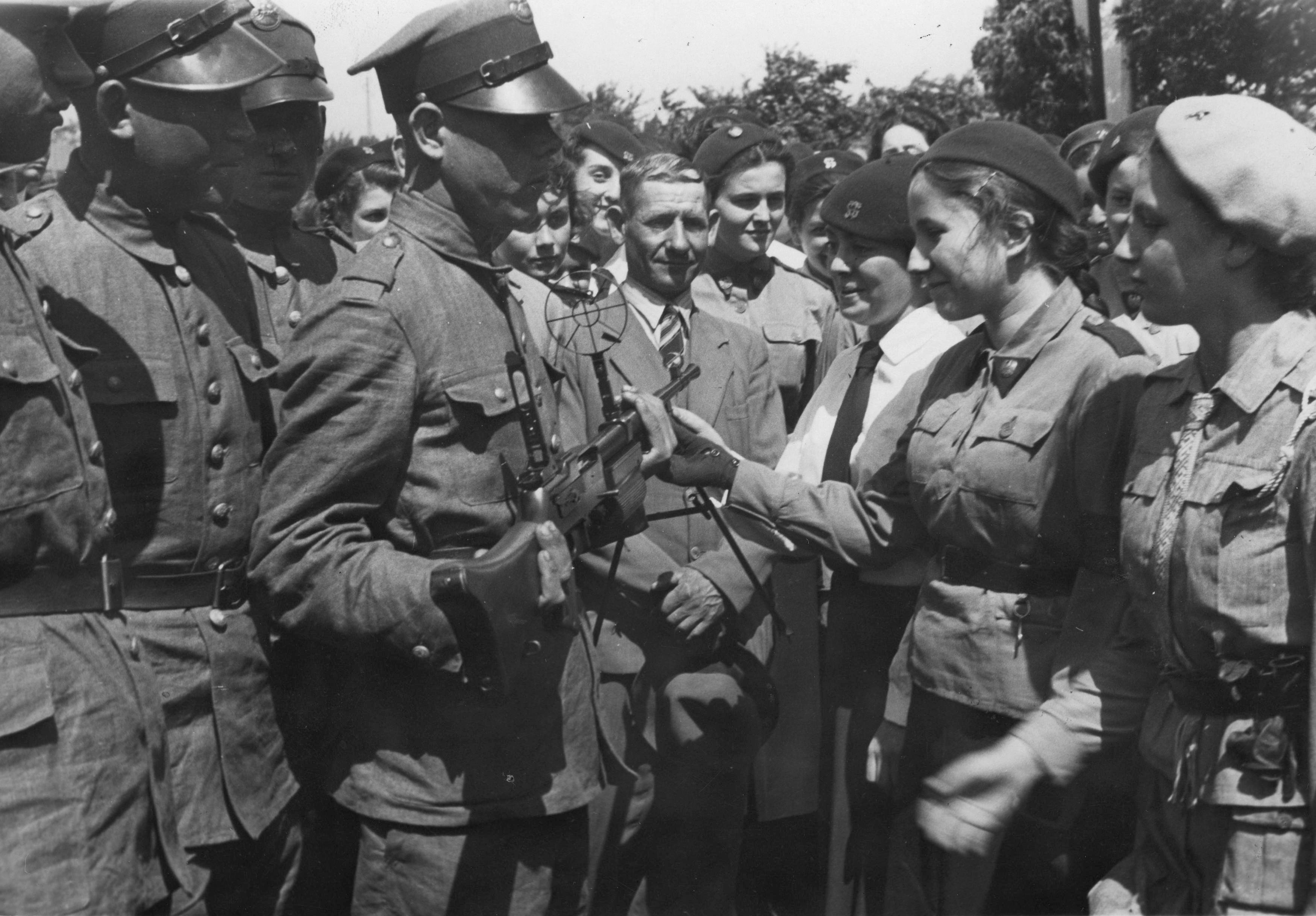
A late series Browning wz. 1928 with anti-aircraft spiderweb sight and more ergonomic buttstock is presented to Polish soldiers during a ceremony in 1938.

In the mid-1930s, Polish small-arms designer Wawrzyniec Lewandowski was tasked with developing a flexible aircraft-mounted machine gun based on the Browning wz.1928. This resulted in the wz. 1937. Changes included increasing the weapon's rate of fire to 1,100 rounds/min, eliminating the butt stock, adding a spade-type grip to the rear of the receiver, moving the main drive spring under the barrel and, most importantly, changing the feed system. Sustained fire was practically impossible with the standard 20-round box magazine, so a new feed mechanism was developed that was added to the receiver as a module. It contains a spring-loaded, bolt-actuated lever that would feed a round from a 91-round pan magazine located above the receiver and force the round into the feed path during unlocking. The machine gun was accepted in 1937 and ordered by the Polish Air Force as the karabin maszynowy obserwatora wz. 1937 ("observers machine gun model 1937"). Eventually 339 machine guns were acquired and used as armament in the PZL.37 Łoś medium bomber and the LWS-3 Mewa reconnaissance aircraft.

=== Sweden ===
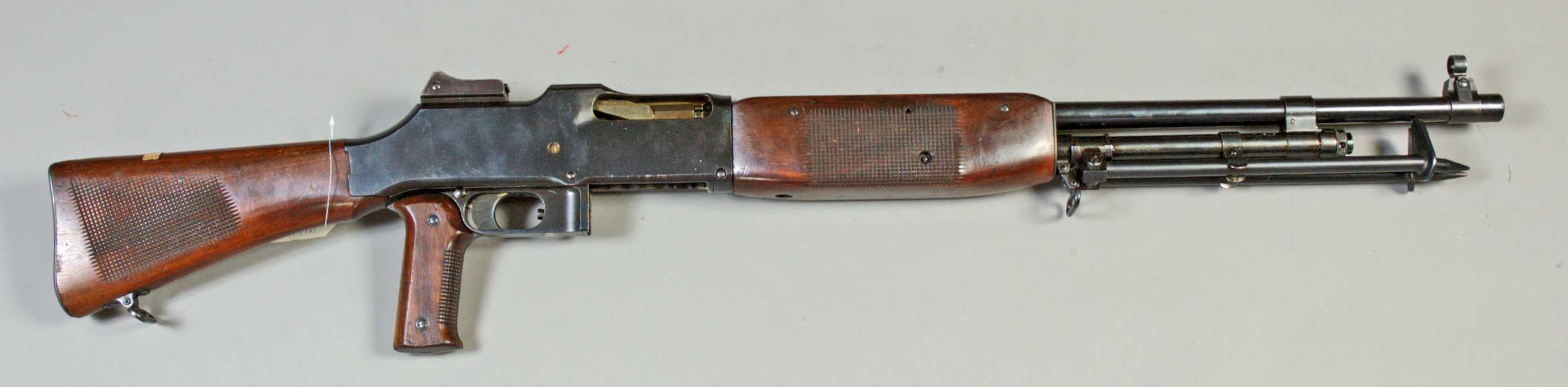
Swedish Kg m/21 model, which was nearly identical to the M1919 configuration

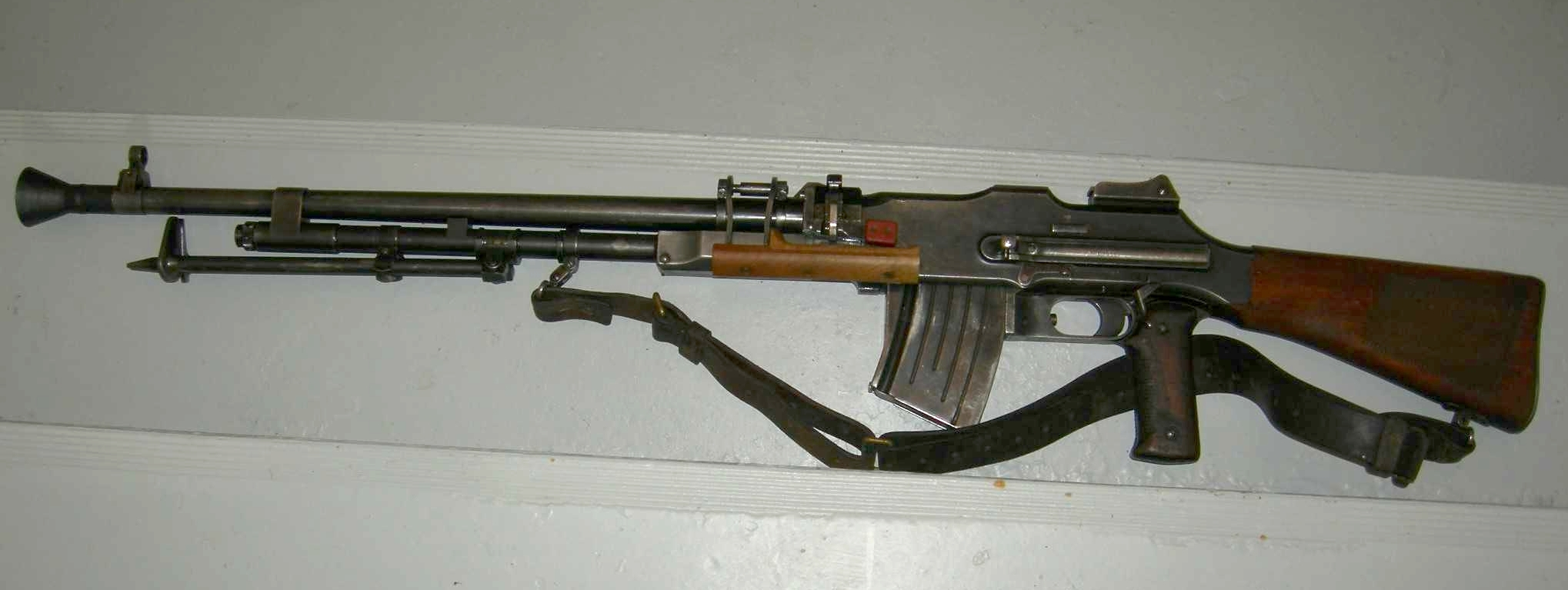
Model Kg m/37 with quick-detachable barrel

In 1920, Belgian arms manufacturer Fabrique Nationale (FN) acquired sales and production rights to the BAR series of firearms in Europe from Colt. The first BAR model sold by FN was the Kg m/21 (Kg—Kulsprutegevär or "machinegun rifle") chambered for the 6.5×55mm m/94 cartridge. The m/21 is a variant of the Model 1919 designed to Swedish specifications and manufactured initially by Colt's and later under license at the Carl Gustafs Stads Gevärsfaktori in Eskilstuna. Compared to the Model 1919, the Swedish weapon has—apart from the different caliber—a spiked bipod and dust covers for ejection. The m/21 would become one of Sweden's main support weapons in the interwar years together with the water-cooled, belt-fed Ksp m/1914 medium machine gun (Swedish adaptation of the Austrian M07/12). Dissatisfied with the rapidly overheating fixed barrel of the m/21, Carl Gustaf began to design a new quick-detach mechanism for the barrel that mates the externally grooved chamber to a series of rotating flanges in the receiver operated by a locking lever. The barrel also received cooling fins along its entire length. These enhancements were incorporated into the fm/1935 prototype, which was favorably evaluated during trials in 1935. The final version was the Kg m/37, adopted for service in 1937, which uses a smooth-contour, unfinned barrel. Numerous m/21 guns were retrofitted with the screw-on receiver extension and quick-change barrel and renamed the Kg m/21-37. The m/37 remained in service until replaced by the FN MAG, but was still in second-line use until 1980. Carl Gustaf also developed a belt-fed prototype; however, it was never adopted.

=== China ===
The Chinese Nationalist Army used the FN Mle 1930 throughout the Second Sino-Japanese War. 29,550 were bought from Belgium between 1933 and 1939. The Chinese BAR was chambered for the German 7.92×57mm Mauser round, the standard rifle cartridge of the National Revolutionary Army. After the outbreak of the Pacific War, the Chinese Expeditionary Army in Burma was equipped with American BARs. Towards the end of World War II, small quantities of American equipment, including the BAR, made their way into mainland China.

== Civilian use ==
=== Post World War I ===
With the cessation of WWI hostilities, Colt Arms Co. received the Browning patents to produce the BAR that had been withheld from issue during the war. This allowed Colt to make the BAR available for commercial sale, including to civilian owners. The Colt Automatic Machine Rifle Model 1919, initially made up of overruns from the M1918 military production contract, was the first of several commercial Colt BARs that would follow. However, the high price of the weapon and its limited utility for most civilian owners resulted in few sales. Ad Topperwien, a famous trick shooter of the early 1920s, purchased one of the first Colt-produced BARs to perform aerial target shooting exhibitions. Occasional BAR sales were made to civilian owners through distributors such as the Ott-Heiskell Hardware Co.

In 1931, the new Colt Monitor was made available to civilians during the Depression at $300 each, including a spare parts kit, sling, cleaning accessories and six magazines, but Colt records indicate no domestic sales to individuals.

=== Post National Firearms Act ===
After passage of the National Firearms Act of 1934, civilian BAR ownership was restricted even further. Importation of machine guns for transfer between civilians was prohibited in 1968 and the production of machine guns for civilian transfer was banned in 1986. However, machine guns produced prior to 1986 are still transferable, and fully-automatic BAR models exist and occasionally come up for sale to qualified buyers.

=== 21st century ===
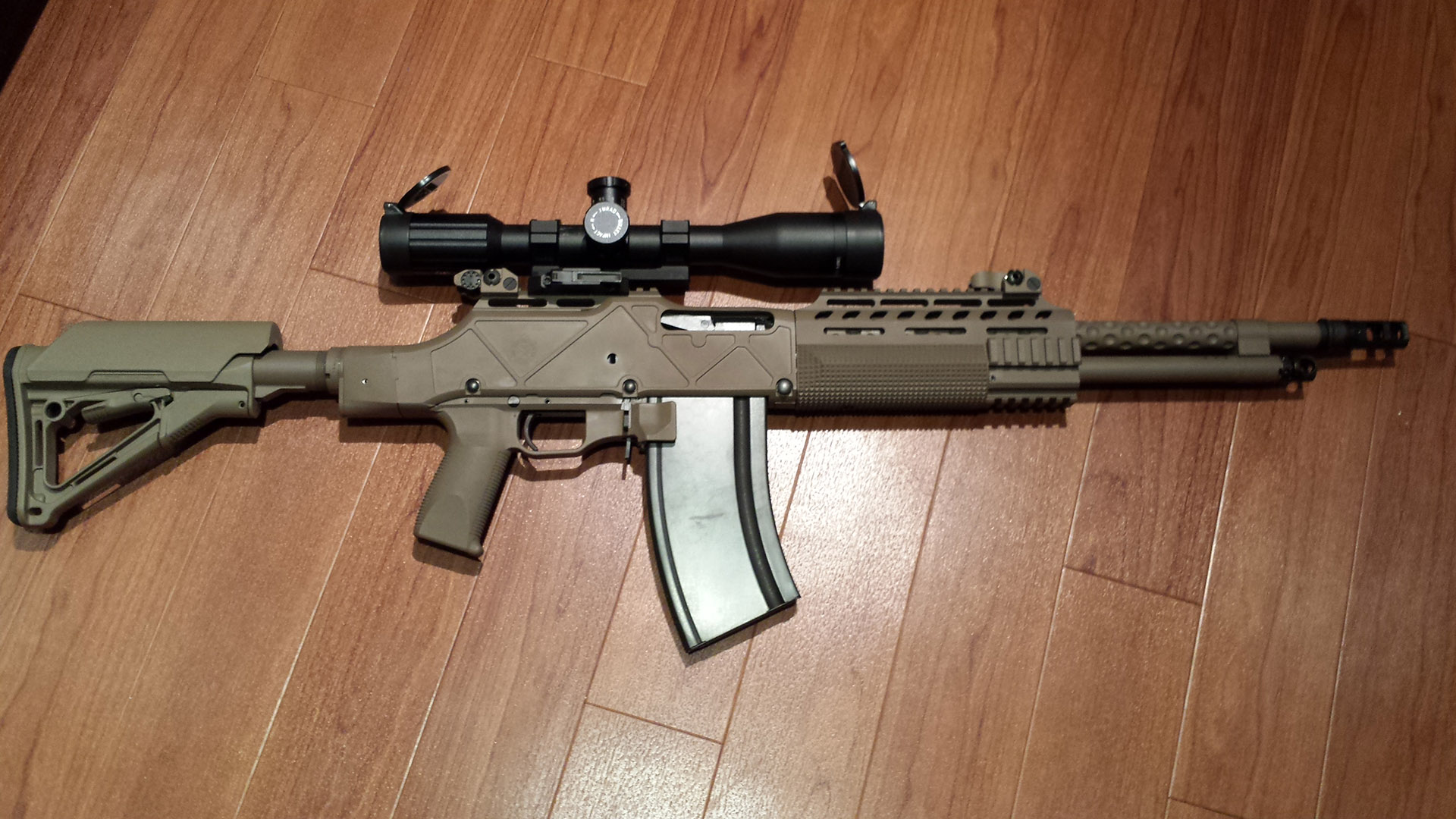
Heavy Counter Assault Rifle (HCAR), a modernized lightweight civilian variant of the M1918 BAR produced by Ohio Ordnance Works.

Some companies continue to manufacture semi-automatic copies for sale to civilians, such as Ohio Ordnance Works, Inc., in Chardon, Ohio. Ohio Ordnance Works produces a contemporary semi-automatic variant of the M1918 called "1918A3-SLR", and a much modified lightened version called HCAR (Heavy Counter Assault Rifle), which are legal for civilians without an FFL (federal firearms license) to own.

== Criminal and law enforcement use ==
Although the Colt Monitor version of the BAR failed to interest U.S. civilian buyers in the midst of the Depression, the underworld was a lot more interested: in 1936 the price of a black-market Colt Monitor was $5,000, with military BARs going for somewhat less. The army's M1918 was a favorite of gangster Clyde Barrow, who obtained his through periodic robberies of Army National Guard armories in the Midwest. Barrow liked to use armor-piercing (AP) .30-06 ammunition he obtained from armory stores, and frequently modified his BARs to suit his own needs. Barrow taught his girlfriend Bonnie Parker to fire the M1918 as well, and by all accounts she was an excellent BAR operator. She used an M1918 on full-automatic to pin down unsuspecting law officers after they confronted the gang at a house in Joplin, Missouri. A Missouri highway patrolman at the scene, forced to dive for cover behind a substantial oak tree after Bonnie Parker opened up on him, later stated, "That little red-headed woman filled my face with splinters on the other side of that tree with one of those damned guns."

As the use of automatic weapons by criminal elements in the U.S. became more widespread, FBI Director J. Edgar Hoover ordered the agency to acquire and commence regular training with automatic shoulder weapons, including the Thompson submachine gun and the BAR. For its BARs the FBI turned to Colt, which sold 90 Colt Monitor automatic machine rifles to the agency. Some of the FBI's Monitors were distributed to field offices for use as support weapons if needed on a particular operation, while the remainder were retained at the FBI Academy in Quantico, Virginia, for training purposes. Colt sold an additional 11 Colt Monitors to the U.S. Treasury Department in 1934, while 24 guns were sold to state prisons, banks, security companies and accredited city, county and state police departments. At least one member of the ambush team that killed Bonnie and Clyde was armed with a Colt Monitor.

Although it has sometimes been alleged that the M1918 or M1918A2 BAR was used by members of the Symbionese Liberation Army (SLA) in a shootout with Los Angeles police on May 17, 1974, no SLA members ever used such a weapon. The confusion arose out of Browning's decision in the 1970s to also designate its semi-automatic hunting rifle the Browning BAR. The SLA converted a .30-06 Browning BAR hunting rifle and a .243 Remington Model 742 to automatic fire by filing down the sear, and it was these weapons that were used in the shootout.

== In U.S. military service ==
=== World War I ===
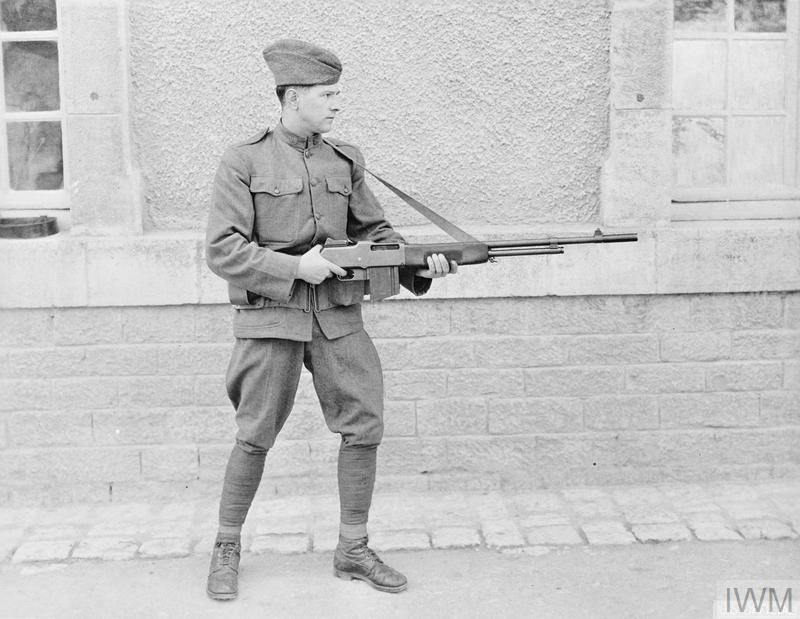
A U.S. soldier in France demonstrates a Browning Automatic Rifle (BAR), November 1918.

At its inception, the M1918 was intended to be used as a shoulder-fired rifle capable of both semi-automatic and fully automatic fire. First issued in September 1918 to the American Expeditionary Forces, it was based on the concept of "walking fire", a French practice in use since 1916 for which the CSRG 1915 (Chauchat) had been used accompanying advancing squads of riflemen toward the enemy trenches, as regular machine guns were too cumbersome to move with the troops during an assault.

In addition to shoulder-fired operation, BAR gunners were issued a belt with magazine pouches for the BAR and sidearm along with a "cup" to support the stock of the rifle when held at the hip. In theory, this allowed the soldier to lay suppressive fire while walking forward, keeping the enemy's head down, a practice known as "marching fire". The idea would resurface in the submachine gun and ultimately the assault rifle. It is not known if any of the belt-cup devices actually saw combat use.

The BAR was originally proposed for use by a team of three men. The gunner carried the BAR with six loaded magazines, while the loader carried eighteen loaded magazines and the carrier carried twenty loaded magazines. It was assumed that weight distribution would allow the team to move as fast as infantry riflemen. Although 17,000 BARs were in France by the end of July 1918, the BAR only saw minor action in France during World War I, being brought into action only as late as September 1918, less than three months before Armistice Day. The intentional delay had been inspired by General Pershing, the AEF commander, in order not to let the BAR fall into enemy hands too early. By the end of the war in November, 52,000 BARs were available.

In General of the Armies John J. Pershing’s memoirs titled My Experiences in the World War, published in 1931, Pershing wrote about the pressing need at the beginning of the war for the United States to develop automatic weapons, referring to the BAR:

The development of the machine gun as an infantry weapon, following the experience of the Russo-Japanese War had been carried to a high degree of perfection, especially in the German Army, where its value was more fully appreciated than among the Allies. The question of adopting new types of machine guns and automatic rifles for our Army had been discussed at home for years and test after test had been made…The result was that when we entered the war no conclusion regarding the best make of gun had been reached…Not only were we without sufficient machine guns but also our organization tables did not anticipate their use in anything like the numbers employed by the enemy.

— John J. Pershing, My Experiences in the World War (1931)

=== Interwar use ===
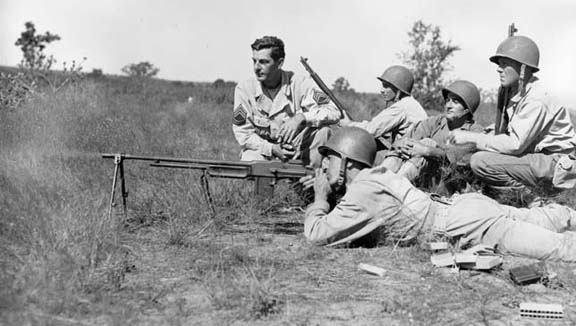
A U.S. Army soldier trains with a Browning Automatic Rifle (BAR).

During the interwar years, as the U.S. Army was reduced significantly in size, the BAR remained in the smaller extant Regular Army and by the 1930s, was also issued to state national guard units to be maintained at their armories. Given the part-time nature, smaller manning and lesser security of these national guard armories when compared to regular army installations, some BARs were subject to plunder by domestic civilian criminal elements.

The BAR was also standard issue to U.S. naval landing forces during the period. The weapon was a standard item in U.S. warship armories, and each BAR was accompanied by a spare barrel. Large capital ships often had over 200 BARs on board, with many of the U.S. Navy BARs remaining in service well into the 1960s.

The BAR also saw action with U.S. Marine Corps units participating in the Haitian and Nicaraguan interventions, as well as with U.S. Navy shipboard personnel in the course of patrol and gunboat duty along the Yangtze River in China. The First Marine Brigade stationed in Port-au-Prince, Haiti, noted that training a man to use the BAR proficiently took a full two days of range practice and instruction, compared to half a day with the .45 caliber Thompson submachine gun.

Prior to World War II, both the U.S. Army and Marine Corps had a separate BAR squad together with three rifle squads in the "square" organisation of the time. When converting to the "triangular" organisation the separate BAR squad was eliminated with BARs going to each rifle squad.

=== World War II ===
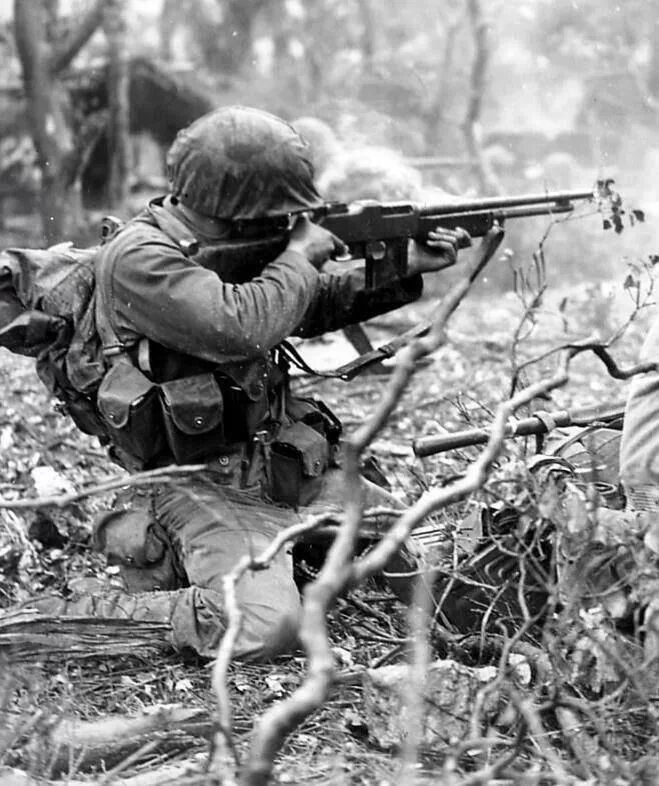
A U.S. Marine Corps infantryman fires a Browning Automatic Rifle during combat operations.

When the threat of a new war arose, Ordnance belatedly realized that it had no portable, squad light machine gun, and attempted to convert the M1918 BAR to that role with the adoption of the M1918A2 by the U.S. Army on 30 June 1938. The BAR was issued as the sole automatic fire support for a twelve-man squad, and all men were trained at the basic level how to operate and fire the weapon in case the designated operators were killed or wounded. At the start of the war, infantry companies designated three-man BAR teams, a gunner, an assistant gunner, and an ammunition bearer who carried additional magazines for the gun. By 1944, some units were using one-man BAR "teams" with the other riflemen in the squad detailed to carry additional magazines or bandoliers of .30 ammunition. Contrary to certain claims, the BAR was issued to soldiers of various heights.

As originally conceived, U.S. Army tactical doctrine called for one M1918A2 per squad, using several men to support and carry ammunition for the gun. Fire and movement tactics centered on the M1 riflemen in the squad while the BAR man was detailed to support the riflemen in the attack and provide mobility to the riflemen with a base of fire. This doctrine received a setback early in the war after U.S. ground forces encountered German troops, well-armed with automatic weapons including fast-firing, portable machine guns. In some cases, particularly in the attack, every fourth German infantryman was equipped with an automatic weapon, either a submachine gun or a full-power machine gun.

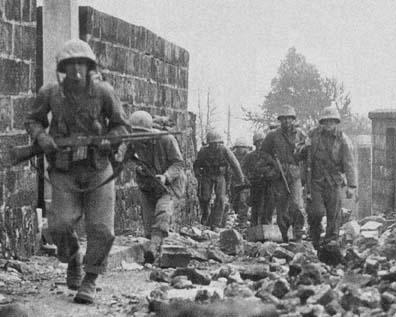
Elements of the 6th Marine Division advance through rubble during the Battle of Okinawa, with the lead Marine carrying a Browning Automatic Rifle.

In an attempt to overcome the BAR's limited continuous-fire capability, U.S. Army divisions increasingly began to specify two BAR fire teams per squad, following the practice of the U.S. Marine Corps. One team would typically provide covering fire until a magazine was empty, whereupon the second team would open fire, thus allowing the first team to reload. In the Pacific, the BAR was often employed at the point or tail of a patrol or infantry column, where its firepower could help break contact on a jungle trail in the event of an ambush. After combat experience showed the benefits of maximizing portable automatic firepower in squad-size formations, the U.S. Marine Corps began to increase the number of BARs in its combat divisions, from 513 per division in 1943 to 867 per division in 1945. A thirteen-man squad was developed, consisting of 3 four-man fire teams, with one BAR per fire team, or three BARs per squad. Instead of supporting the M1 riflemen in the attack, Marine tactical doctrine was focused around the BAR, with riflemen supporting and protecting the BAR gunner.

Despite the improvements in the M1918A2, the BAR remained a difficult weapon to master with its open bolt and strong recoil spring, requiring additional range practice and training to hit targets accurately without flinching. As a squad light machine gun, the BAR's effectiveness was mixed, since its thin, non-quick-change barrel and small magazine capacity greatly limited its firepower in comparison to genuine light machine guns such as the British Bren and the Japanese Type 96. The weapon's rate-reducer mechanism, a delicately balanced spring-and-weight system described by one ordnance sergeant as a "Rube Goldberg device", came in for much criticism, often causing malfunctions when not regularly cleaned. The bipod and buttstock rest (monopod), which contributed so much to the M1918A2's accuracy when firing prone on the rifle range, proved far less valuable under actual field combat conditions. The stock rest was dropped from production in 1942, while the M1918A2's bipod and flash hider were often discarded by individual soldiers and marines to save weight and improve portability, particularly in the Pacific Theater of war. With these modifications, the BAR effectively reverted to its original role as a portable, shoulder-fired automatic rifle.

Due to production demands, war priorities, subcontractor issues, and material shortages, demand for the M1918A2 frequently exceeded supply, and as late as 1945 some Army units were sent into combat still carrying older, unmodified M1918 weapons.

After a period of service, ordnance personnel began to receive BARs with inoperable or malfunctioning recoil buffer mechanisms. This was eventually traced to the soldier's common practice of cleaning the BAR in a vertical position with the butt of the weapon on the ground, allowing cleaning fluid and burned powder to collect in the recoil buffer mechanism. Additionally, unlike the M1 rifle, the BAR's gas cylinder was never changed to stainless steel. Consequently, the gas cylinder frequently rusted solid from the use of corrosive-primered M2 service ammunition in a humid environment when not stripped and cleaned on a daily basis. While not without design flaws (a thin-diameter, fixed barrel that quickly overheated, limited magazine capacity, complex field-strip/cleaning procedure, unreliable recoil buffer mechanism, a gas cylinder assembly made of corrosion-prone metals, and many small internal parts), the BAR proved rugged and reliable enough when regularly field-stripped and cleaned.

During World War II, the BAR saw extensive service, both official and unofficial, with many branches of service. One of the BAR's most unusual uses was as a defensive aircraft weapon. In 1944, Captain Wally A. Gayda, of the USAAF Air Transport Command, reportedly used a BAR to return fire against a Japanese Army Nakajima fighter that had attacked his C-46 cargo plane over the Hump in Burma. Gayda shoved the rifle out of his forward cabin window, emptying the magazine and apparently killing the Japanese pilot.

=== Korean War ===
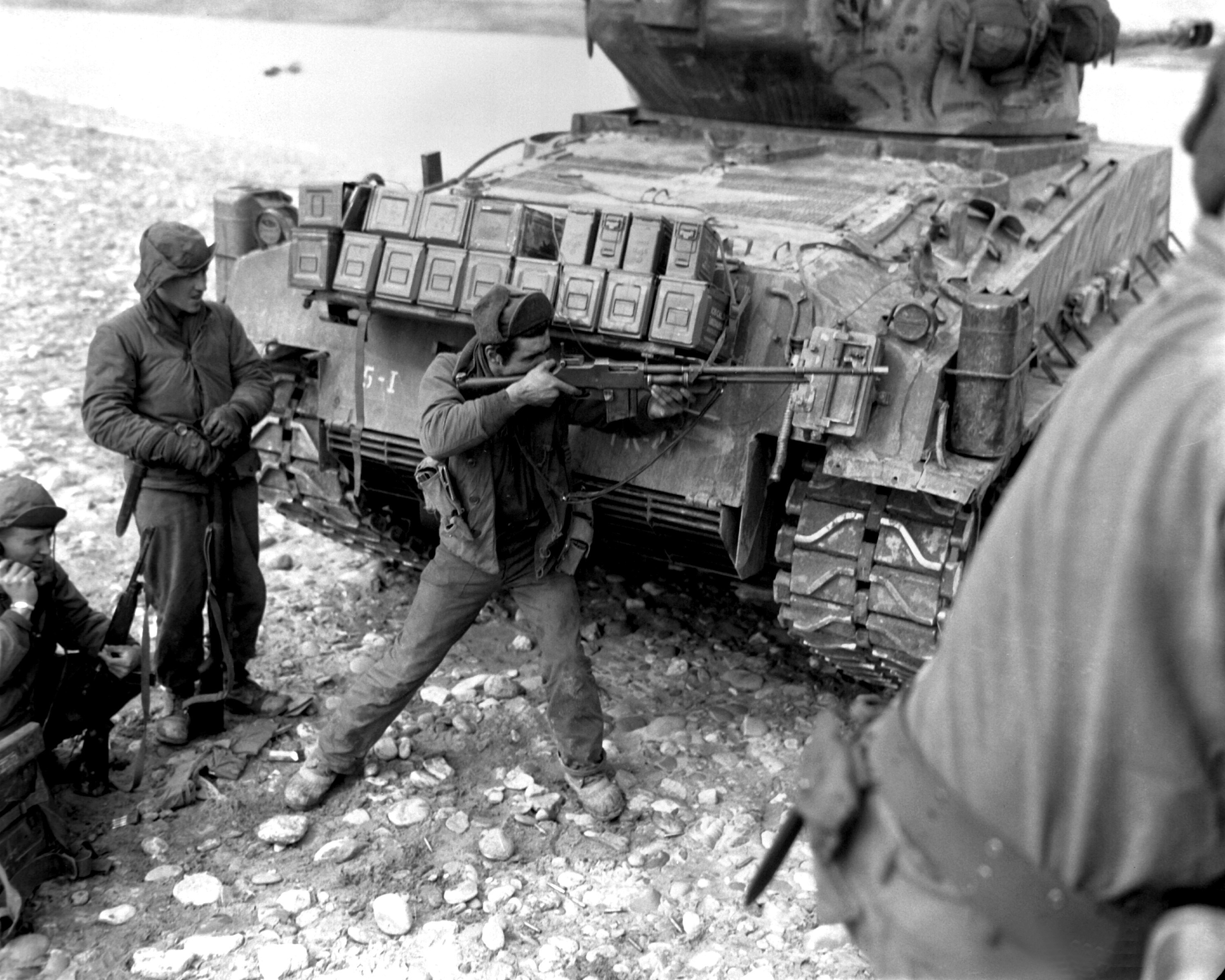
A U.S. soldier aims an M1918A2 Browning Automatic Rifle while positioned behind an M4A3(76)W HVSS Sherman tank during the Korean War, 1951.

The BAR continued in service in the Korean War. The last military contract for the manufacture of the M1918A2 was awarded to the Royal Typewriter Co. of Hartford, Connecticut, which manufactured a total of 61,000 M1918A2s during the conflict, using ArmaSteel cast receivers and trigger housings. In his study of infantry weapons in Korea, historian S.L.A. Marshall interviewed hundreds of officers and men in after-action reports on the effectiveness of various U.S. small arms in the conflict. General Marshall's report noted that an overwhelming majority of respondents praised the BAR and the utility of automatic fire delivered by a lightweight, portable small arm in both day and night engagements. In his autobiography Colonel David Hackworth praised the BAR as 'the best weapon of the Korean War'.

A typical BAR gunner of the Korean War carried the twelve-magazine belt and combat suspenders, with three or four extra magazines in pockets. Extra canteens, .45 pistol, grenades, and a flak vest added still more weight. As in World War II, many BAR gunners disposed of the heavy bipod and other accoutrements of the M1918A2, but unlike the prior conflict the flash hider was always retained because of its utility in night fighting.

The large amounts of ammunition expended by BAR teams in Korea placed additional demands on the assistant gunner to stay in close contact with the BAR at all times, particularly on patrols. While the BAR magazines themselves always seemed to be in short supply, Gen. Marshall reported that "riflemen in the squad were markedly willing to carry extra ammunition for the BAR man".

In combat, the M1918A2 frequently decided the outcome of determined attacks by North Korean and Chinese communist forces. Communist tactical doctrine centered on the mortar and machine gun, with attacks designed to envelop and cut off United Nations forces from supply and reinforcement. Communist machine gun teams were the best-trained men in any given North Korean or Chinese infantry unit, skilled at placing their heavily camouflaged and protected weapons as close to UN forces as possible. Once concealed, they often surprised UN forces by opening fire at very short ranges, covering any exposed ground with a hail of accurately sighted machine gun fire. Under these conditions it was frequently impossible for U.S. machine gun crews to move up their Browning M1919A4 and M1919A6 guns in response without taking heavy casualties; when they were able to do so, their position was carefully noted by the enemy, who would frequently kill the exposed gun crews with mortar or machine gun fire while they were still emplacing their guns. The BAR gunner, who could stealthily approach the enemy gun position alone (and prone if need be), proved invaluable in this type of combat.

During the height of combat, the BAR gunner was often used as the 'fire brigade' weapon, helping to bolster weak areas of the perimeter under heavy pressure by communist forces. In defense, it was often used to strengthen the firepower of a forward outpost. Another role for the BAR was to deter or eliminate enemy sniper fire. In the absence of a trained sniper, the BAR proved more effective than the random response of five or six M1 riflemen.

Compared to World War II, U.S. infantry forces saw a huge increase in the number of night engagements. The added firepower of the BAR rifleman and his ability to redeploy to 'hot spots' around the unit perimeter proved indispensable in deterring night infiltration by skirmishers as well as repelling large-scale night infantry assaults.

While new-production M1918A2 guns were almost universally praised for faultless performance in combat, a number of malfunctions in combat were reported with armory-reconditioned M1918A2s, particularly weapons that had been reconditioned by Ordnance in Japan, which did not replace operating (recoil) springs as a requirement of the reconditioning program. After decades of complaints, ordnance addressed the problem of maintaining the problematic gas piston on the BAR by issuing disposable nylon gas valves. When the nylon valve became caked over with carbon, it could be discarded and replaced with a fresh unit, eliminating the tedious task of cleaning and polishing the valve with wire brush and GI solvent (frequently in short supply to line units).

=== Vietnam War ===
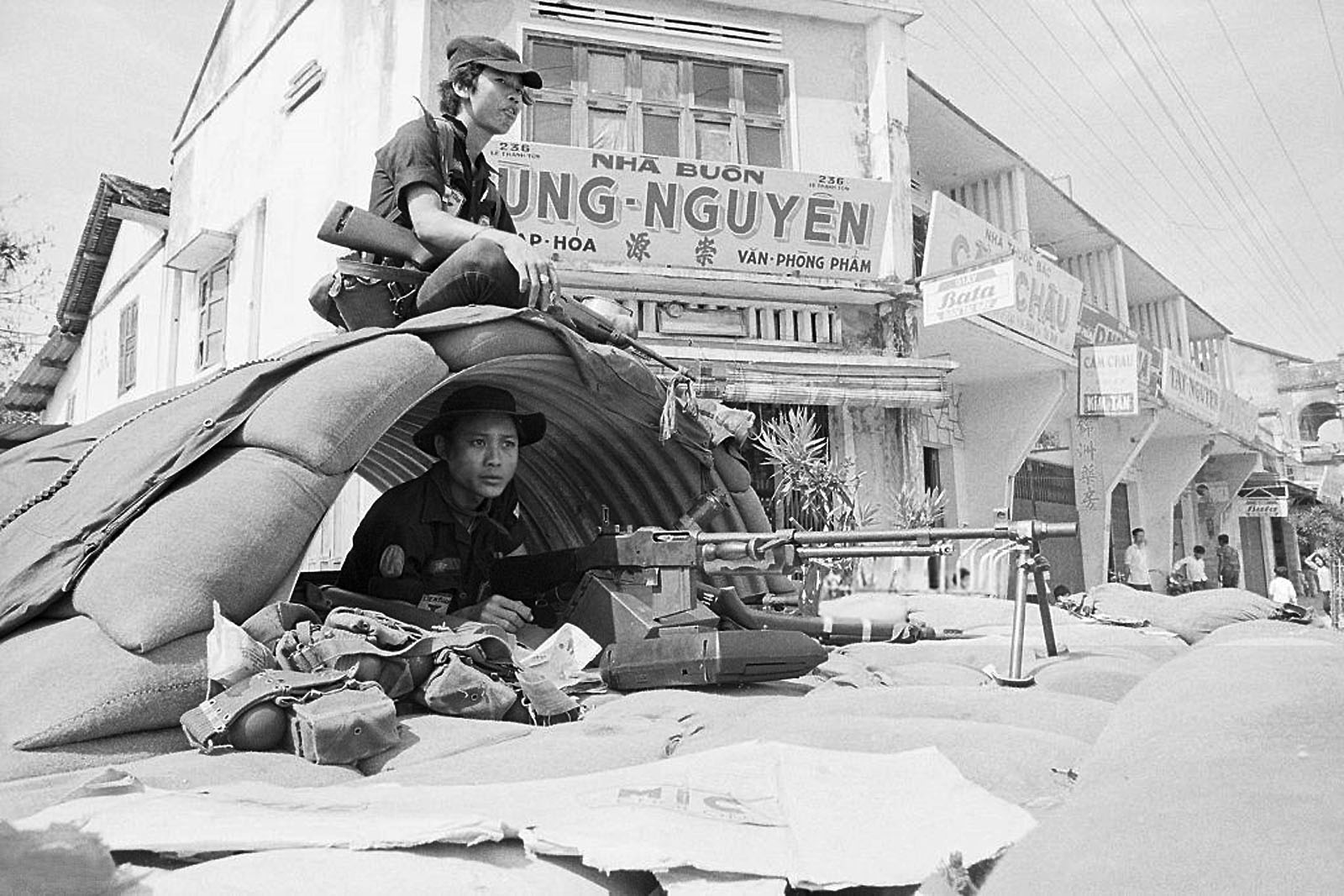
A South Vietnamese soldier armed with a Browning Automatic Rifle (BAR) light machine gun.

The M1918A2 was used in the early stages of the Vietnam War, when the U.S. delivered a quantity of "obsolete", second-line small arms to the South Vietnamese Army and associated allies, including the Montagnard hill tribespeople of South Vietnam. U.S. Special Forces advisors frequently chose the BAR over currently available infantry weapons. As one Special Forces sergeant declared, "Many times since my three tours of duty in Vietnam I have thanked God for ... having a BAR that actually worked, as opposed to the jamming M16 ... We had a lot of Viet Cong infiltrators in all our [Special Forces] camps, who would steal weapons every chance they got. Needless to say, the most popular weapon to steal was the venerable old BAR."

An experimental variant was tested at Fort Benning. The barrel was cut back to the gas tube, had a M60 style bipod and flash suppressor, and a shortened stock with the flip up shoulder rest from the M60. Final mod was a box mag that held 50 rounds. The stated purpose was for anti vehicle and structure use. Still heavy but with AP rounds would shred brick/block structures and most things on wheels. Allegedly it was requested by USSS and SOF forces.

A retrospective analysis by two American historians stated that Browning Automatic Rifle related shipments had provided "serviceable weapons" yet that the generally "short and slightly built" Vietnamese men using them experienced problems given the nature of "Western standards" around physicality.

=== Post-Vietnam use ===
Quantities of the BAR remained in use by the Army National Guard up until the mid-1970s. Many recipients of U.S. foreign aid adopted the BAR and used it into the 1980s and 1990s.

== Variants ==
=== Military ===
United States

- M1918
- M1922
- M1918A1
- M1918A2

Belgium

- FN M^{le} 30
- FN Model D

France

- MAS modèle 1922

Poland

- Rkm wz. 28 – BAR variant made by FN Herstal to meet Polish requirements. The modifications included changing the round (from .30-06 Springfield to standard Polish 7.92×57mm Mauser), the construction of a bipod and mounting, and the iron sights (peephole changed to v-notch type).

Sweden

- Kg m/21
- Kg m/37

=== Commercial ===
Colt

- Colt Model U – Early commercial variant of the BAR, also known as Automatic Machine Rifle Model 1919.
- Colt Model 1924 – Early commercial variant of the BAR.
- Colt Monitor – Commercial variant of the BAR.

Ohio Ordnance

- Ohio Ordnance M1918A3 – A semi-automatic commercial version of the BAR made by Ohio Ordnance. The action was redesigned to fire from a closed bolt and will not accept any GI automatic parts. Most of the weapon is made up of USGI surplus parts. It is chambered in 7.62×51mm NATO and .30-06 Springfield.
- Ohio Ordnance HCAR – A modernized M1918 variant with 30 round magazines and Picatinny rails.

== Users ==
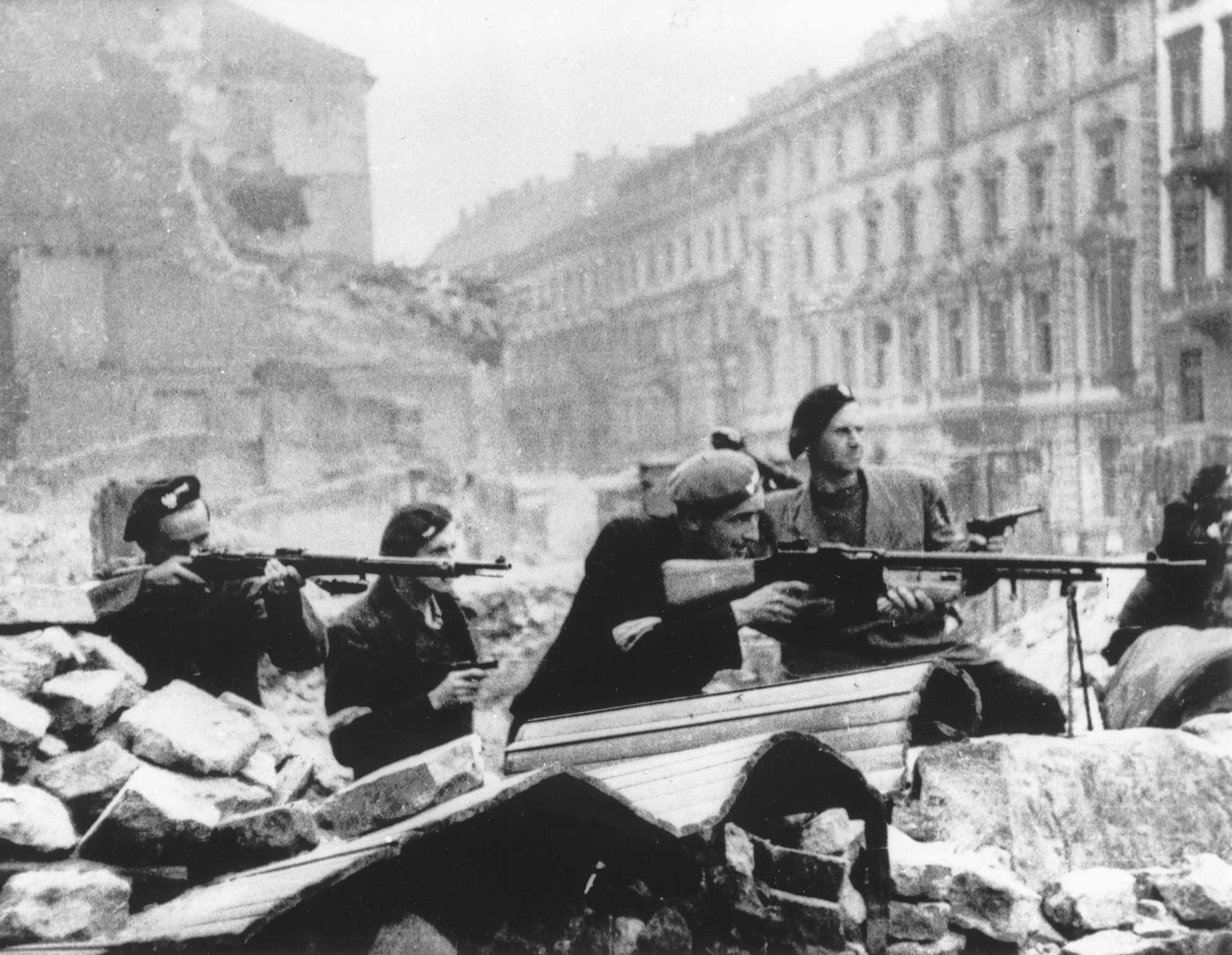
Polish resistance fighters during the Warsaw Uprising, 1944, armed with a wz. 28 light machine gun.

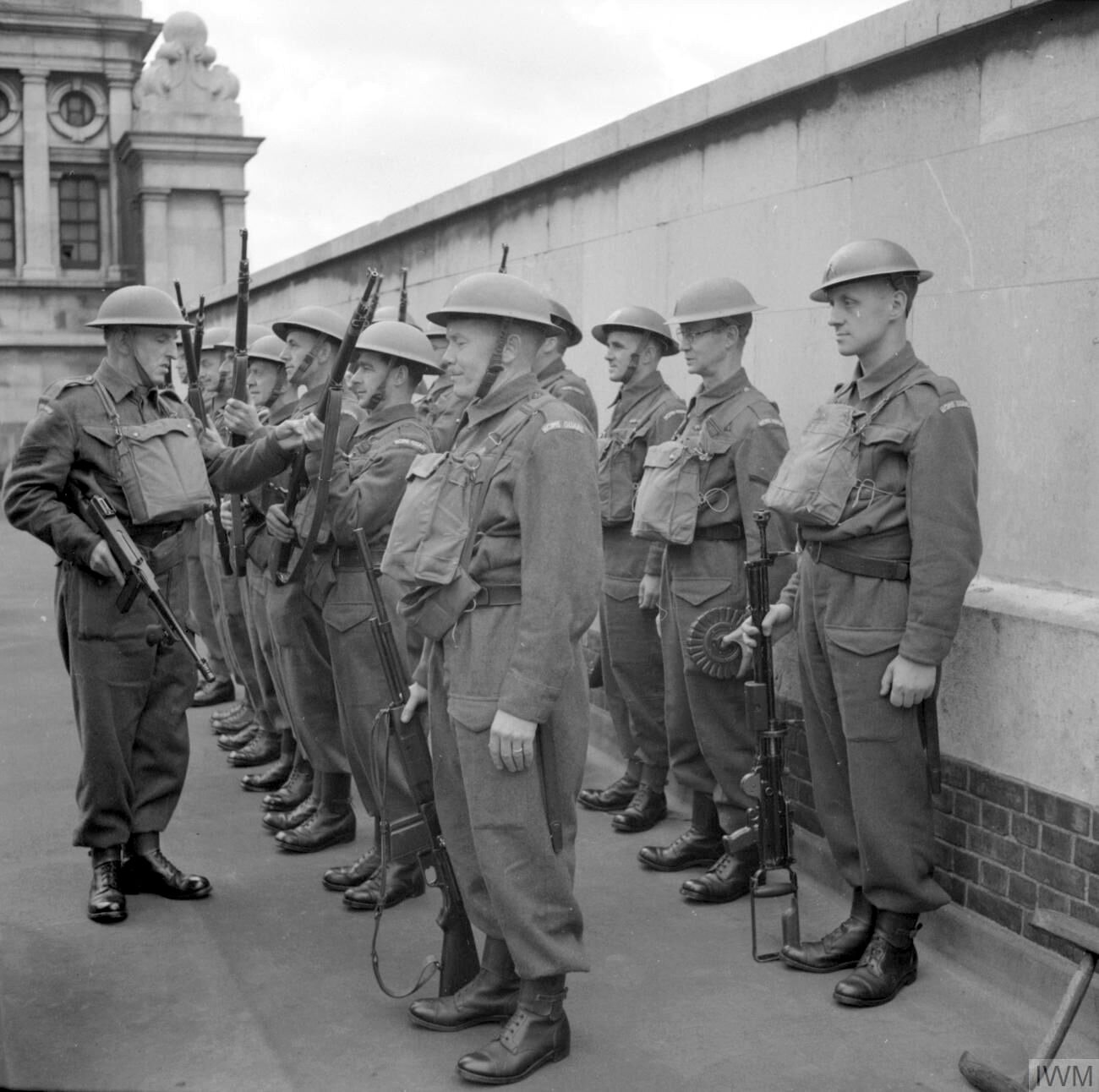
British Home Guard soldiers lined up during training in 1941; the man at the end of the front rank is carrying a Browning Automatic Rifle (BAR).

- Algeria
- Argentina
- Austria
- Belgium – Adopted in 1930, built under licence by Fabrique Nationale.
- Brazil – Two Colt Automatic Rifles were used in the 1923 revolution in Rio Grande do Sul by loyalist forces. Used by the Brazilian Expeditionary Force in WWII.
- Cambodia
- Chile
- People's Republic of China – A large number were seized from the Republic of China during the Chinese Civil War.
- Republic of China – Used by nationalist forces during the Second Sino-Japanese War and subsequent Chinese Civil War, most of them armed with FN Mle 30s
- Colombia
- Costa Rica
- Cuba – Colt commercial BAR and M1918A2 BAR, used by Castro's rebels during the Cuban Revolution. Anticastrists machine gunners of the Brigade 2506 were also equipped with M1918A2 BARs.
- Cyprus
- Egypt – FN type D in 7.92 Mauser.
- Ethiopia – FN Mle 30 and M1918 BAR.
- Finland – FN Mle 30 and Swedish m/21.
- France – Supplied to Free French forces during World War II and later used during the First Indochina War and Algerian War. Known as the Fusil-mitrailleur 7 mm 62 (C. 30) M. 18 (B. A. R.).
- Germany – The Wehrmacht captured a number of Polish-made Browning wz. 1928 guns and used them until the end of World War II under the designation IMG 28(p).
- Greece
- Honduras
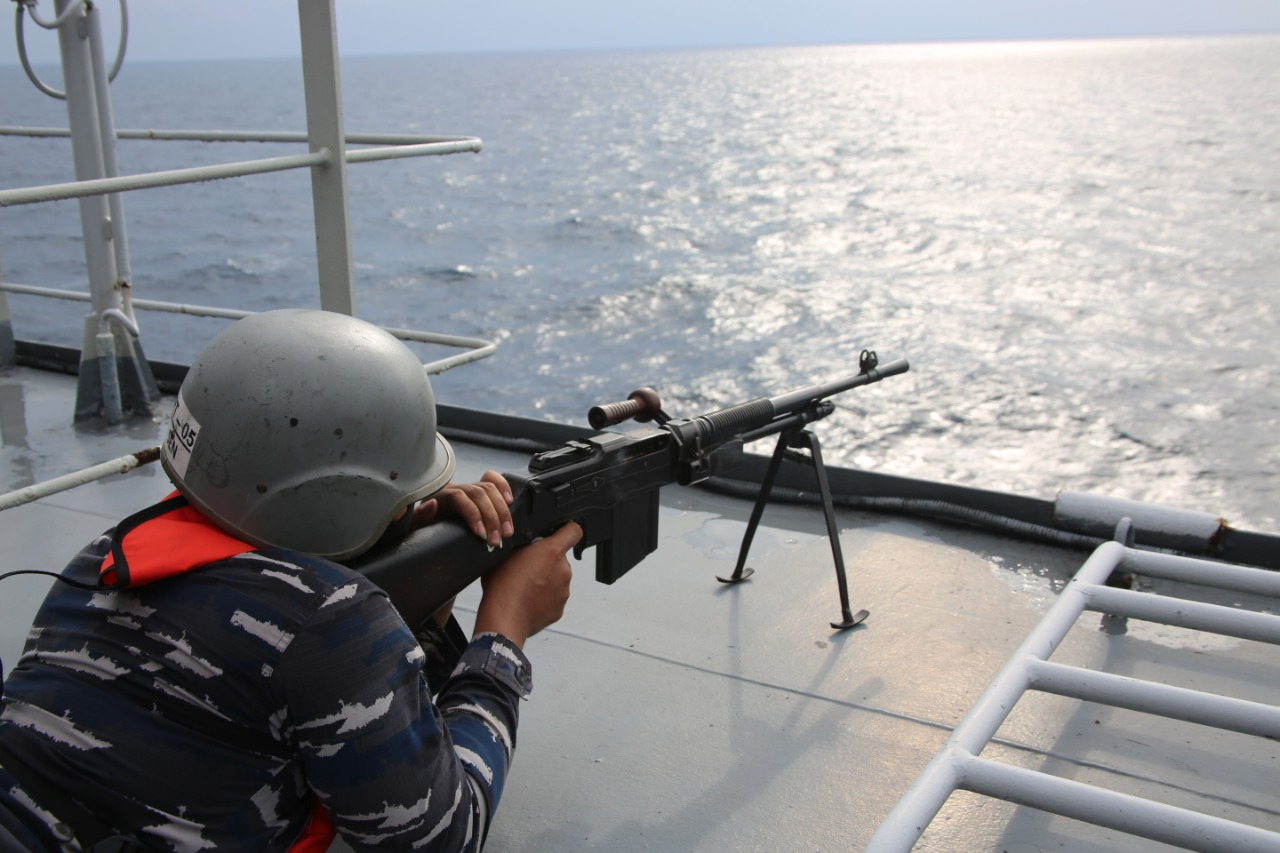
  Indonesian Navy sailor firing an FN Model D (Browning Automatic Rifle variant) during a live-fire exercise, 2020.
- Indonesia – Used M1918A2 and FN Model D in limited service.
- Israel – Used FN Model Ds.
- Italy – Used the M1918A2 as the Fucile Mitragliatore Browning (B.A.R.) cal. 7,62.
- Japan – Used some FN Mle 30s. Most of them were taken from disarmed Chinese forces with original markings removed to use Japanese markings. Used M1918A2 post-war by National Police Reserve.
- South Korea – The Armed Forces received 1,198 M1918A2 before the Korean War, and 11,768 were in service with the Army by the end of the war. Also used as squad automatic weapon in early years of the Vietnam War by the ROK Forces in Vietnam.
- Kingdom of Laos – Received from U.S. Government during Laotian Civil War and Vietnam War.
- Liberia
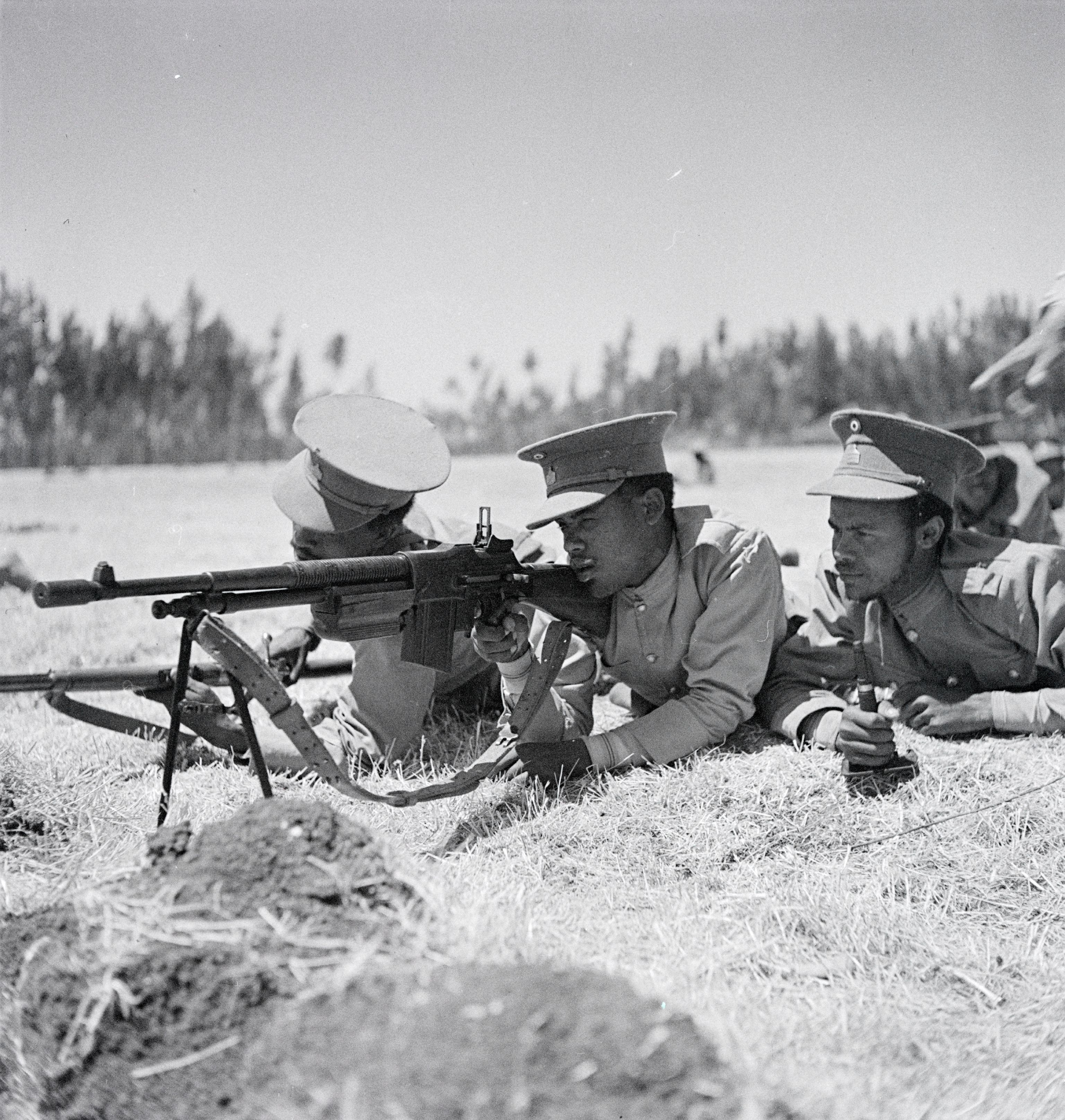
  Ethiopian infantry with the FN Mle 1930 in 1934
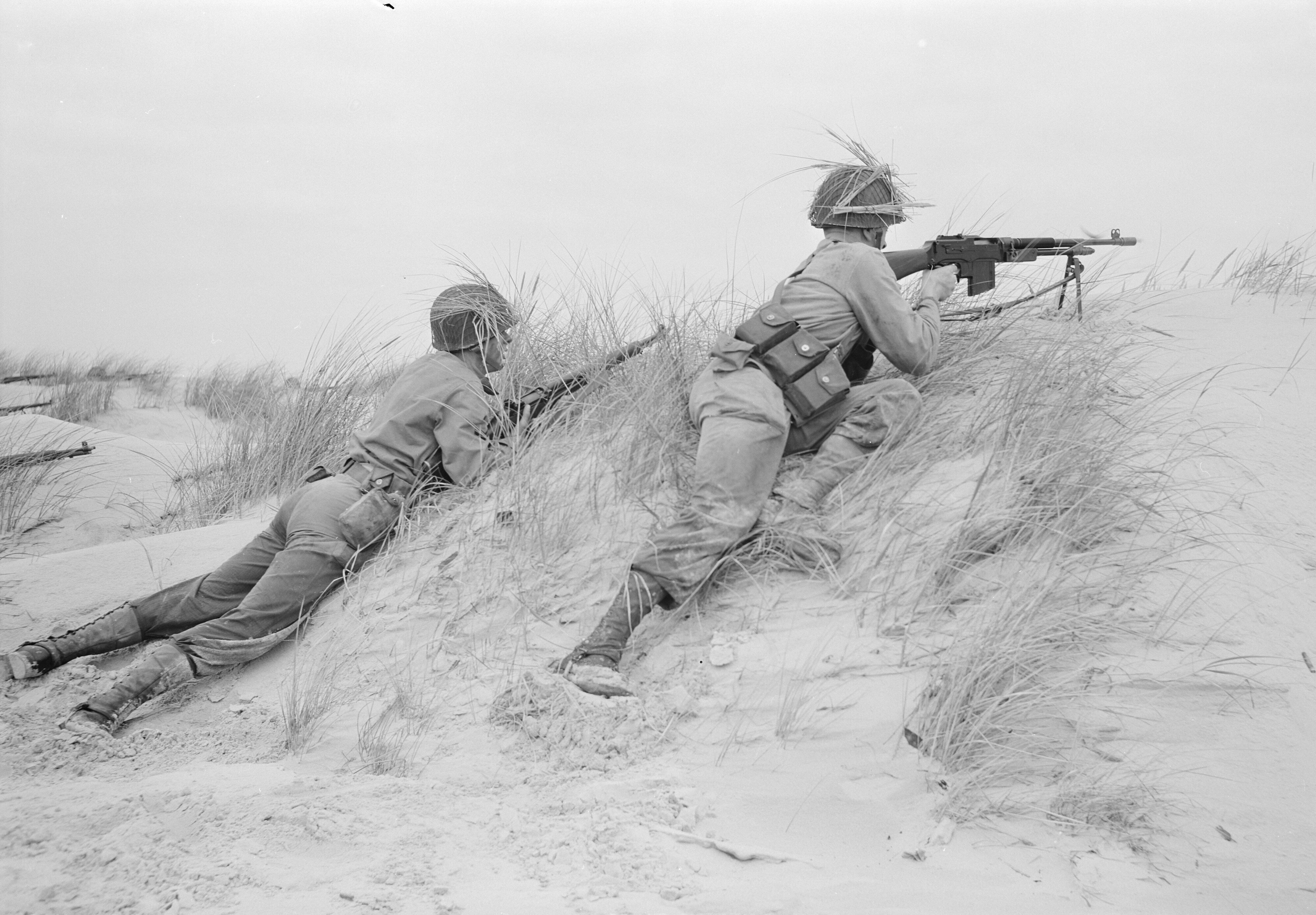
  Dutch marines during the NATO exercise Cutloose on Texel, with one marine armed with an FN Model D rifle, 1956
- Netherlands – Introduced to the Korps Mariniers in 1943 with the creation of the Mariniersbrigade. Known as the Browning Automatisch Geweer M.1918 A2, 243 BARs were in use with the Mariniersbrigade. The Koninklijke Landmacht also used the M1918A2 whilst fighting in the Korean War under United Nations command.
- Nicaragua – The Guardia Nacional de Nicaragua used the BAR, first supplied by the U.S. Marines and later by the U.S. Military Assistance Program (MAP) continuously from 1932 to 1979.
- Norway
- Pakistan – Historically used by Pakistan Armed Forces.
- Philippines – Used by anti-Japanese guerillas and by the Armed Forces of the Philippines during the Hukbalahap Rebellion
- Poland (Browning wz. 1928)
- Spanish Republic
- North Vietnam – Ex-French BARs used by the Viet Cong and the North Vietnamese Army.
- South Vietnam – Used by the ARVN, most provided as surplus.
- Soviet Union – Bought some Colt commercial BARs. Some ex-Polish wz. 1928s also used during the war.
- Sudan – Belgian origin FN type D BAR 7.92×57mm.
- Sweden
- Turkey
- United Kingdom – 25,000 bought from 1940, issued to the Home Guard.
- United States
  - United States Armed Forces
  - Baltimore City Police Department – Colt Monitor R80
- Uruguay
- Venezuela – FN Model D

== See also ==
- List of infantry weapons used during the Second World War
- List of .30-06 Springfield firearms
- FM 24/29 light machine gun
- Lewis automatic machine gun, British support gun
- Kulsprutegevär m/40
- McCrudden light machine rifle
- Mendoza RM2
- Model 45A
- Ribeyrolles 1918 automatic carbine
- Weibel M/1932
