= Maschinengewehr =

Maschinengewehr is German for "machine gun" (literally, "machine rifle"). The standard naming system for German machine guns was a prefix of "Maschinengewehr" (abbreviated as MG) and a two-number suffix giving the year in which the gun was designed.

== Examples ==
- Maschinengewehr 99
- Maschinengewehr 01
- Maschinengewehr 08
- Maschinengewehr 13
- Maschinengewehr 15
- Maschinengewehr 30
- Maschinengewehr 34
- Maschinengewehr 42
- Maschinengewehr 45
- Maschinengewehr 60
- Maschinengewehr 3
- Maschinengewehr 50
- Maschinengewehr 51
- Maschinengewehr 710-3
