= Rheinmetall MG 60 =

- Type: General-purpose machine gun
- Place of origin: West Germany

Production history
- Designer: Johannes Großfuß
- Designed: 1960
- Manufacturer: Rheinmetall
- No. built: 2 prototypes

Specifications
- Mass: 8.6 kg (19.0 lb)
- Length: 1,115 mm (43.9 in)
- Barrel length: 500 mm (19.7 in)
- Cartridge: 7.62×51mm NATO
- Caliber: 7.62 mm
- Action: Roller-delayed blowback
- Rate of fire: 800–1,000 rounds per minute
- Effective firing range: 800 m (874.9 yd)
- Feed system: belt

The Rheinmetall MG60 is a general-purpose machine gun of West German origin. The weapon is a post-World War II derivative of the MG 45 experimental general-purpose machine gun.

The former owner of the Metall und Lackierwarenfabrik Johannes Großfuß AG (Metal and lacquer ware factory Johannes Großfuß corporation) and boss of MG 42 and MG 45 chief designer Werner Gruner had fled to the West after World War II also held all the essential MG 42 patents and became a consultant for Rheinmetall in West Germany. There Johannes Großfuß headed machine gun production in Düsseldorf-Derendorf and was probably also significantly involved in the development of the MG 60. After World War II Werner Gruner worked in the Soviet Union and later in East Germany, and was not involved in the development of this general-purpose machine gun. The MG 60 is lighter in weight and has a significant lower cyclic rate of fire compared to the MG 42 and MG 45 and has an unusual trigger guard.
