= MG 45 =

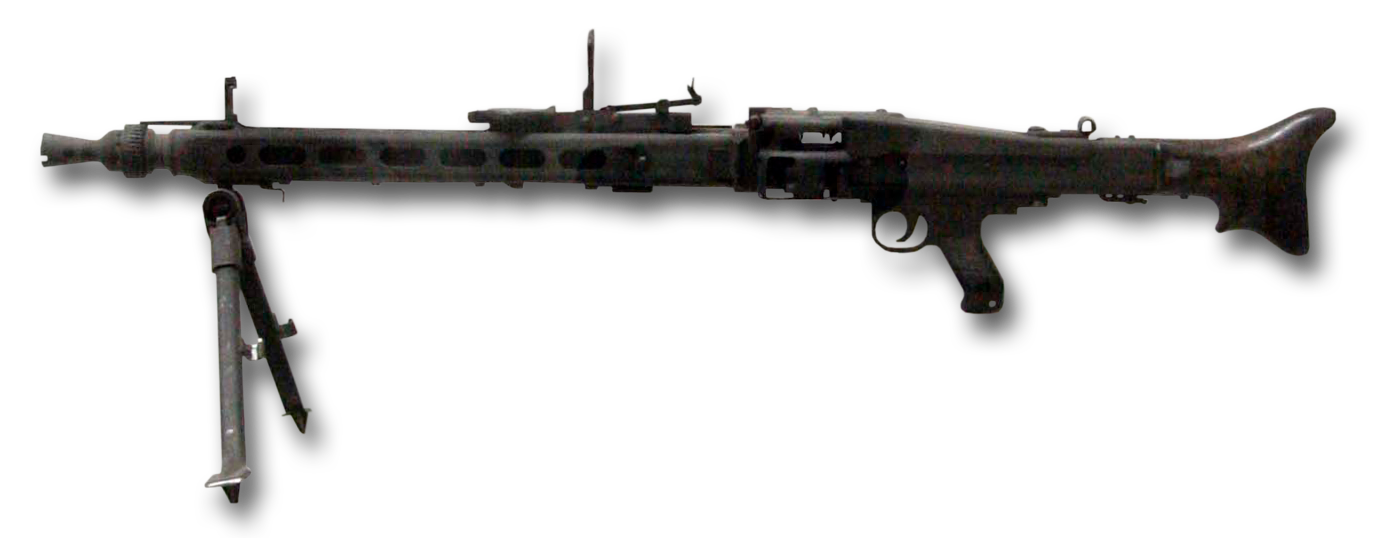
- probable MG 45/42V prototype
- Type: General purpose machine gun
- Place of origin: Nazi Germany

Service history
- Wars: World War II

Production history
- Designer: Metall und Lackierwarenfabrik Johannes Großfuß AG
- Designed: 1944
- No. built: 10 prototypes

Specifications
- Mass: 9 kg (19.8 lb)
- Barrel length: 600 mm (23.6 in)
- Cartridge: 7.92×57mm Mauser
- Barrels: 1
- Action: Roller-delayed blowback
- Rate of fire: 1,800 rounds per minute or 1,350 rpm
- Maximum firing range: 4,000 m (4,374 yd)
- Feed system: belt / 75 round drum magazine
- Sights: Iron

The MG 45 (also known as the MG 42V) was a machine gun based on the MG 42, which was developed but not fielded in significant numbers by the German Army in World War II.

== History ==
In 1944, the material shortages of the Third Reich led to the development of a newer material-saving simplified version of the MG 42, the MG 45 (or MG 42V).

The MG 45/42V is considered a different type of firearm than the MG 42, as the operating mechanisms of these two machine guns are different. The MG 45/MG 42V had some influence in the post-war development of the roller-delayed blowback system, as employed in the Rheinmetall MG 60 general-purpose machine gun prototype, SIG 510 assault rifle, SIG MG 710-3, Heckler & Koch HK 21 general-purpose machine guns and in other post World War II CETME and Heckler & Koch small arms.

== Design details ==
Many parts were identical to those of the MG 42. The ammunition feed, the trigger group and parts of the butt stock of the MG 42 design were reused. The roller-delayed blowback MG 45 operation mechanism differed from the recoil-operated, roller-locked MG 42 in that it did not completely lock its breech before firing, increasing its cyclic rate of fire and simplifying its construction. Compared to the MG 42 the MG 45 used steel of lesser quality, the weight was reduced to 9 kg (19.8 lb), while retaining the horizontal cocking handle. The MG 45 bolt weighed 845 g (29.81 oz). The receiver housing was a metal stamped construction including a muzzle flash hider. Due to the differing operation mechanism the muzzle booster used on the MG 42 to add more energy to the operating components was omitted on the MG 45, since the recoil amplification was not required. The MG 45 barrel was a simple turned part without a locking piece with a lifespan of over 10,000 rounds. The MG 45 development was never completed, so that one has to speak of a prototype. The resulting prototypes remained similar to the earlier MG 42 overall, a deliberate decision made to maintain familiarity. The main advantage of the new weapon was a reduced manufacturing time, the Waffenamt (German Army Weapons Agency) assumed 60% of that of the MG 42. In contrast to the MG 42, the MG 45 had no bottom piece, which is why the action had to be removed upwards with great difficulty.

== Action ==
Roller-delayed blowback-operated breech for automatic weapons

The MG 45/42V was a roller-delayed blowback-operated firearm with a semi-rigid locking mechanism designed to retard the rearward movement of the bolt. This delay was achieved by artificially increasing the inertia of the bolt by using an angular, interposed transmission system, installed symmetrically to the bore axis, with two cylindrical rollers acting as transmission elements against a movable locking piece which drives the heavy bolt carrier. The two-piece bolt assembly consists of a bolt head, which contains the aforementioned rollers, and a supporting locking piece and bolt carrier. During the "unlocking" sequence, the bolt head receives the recoil impulse from the ignited cartridge and exerts rearward pressure against the rollers, seated in recesses in the barrel extension. The rollers are driven inward against angled ramps of the barrel extension and interact with the wedge-shaped locking piece, projecting it backwards. Thus a transmission ratio is maintained (as long as the rollers move on the inclined surfaces of the barrel extension and locking piece) of the bolt carrier and locking piece relative to the bolt head; the bolt carrier travels backwards considerably faster than the bolt head, ensuring a safe drop of pressure within the barrel prior to extraction. Extraction is carried-out under relatively high pressure. The primary advantage of roller-delayed blowback is the simplicity of the design compared to gas or recoil operation. It is unknown whether the MG 45/42V had longitudinal gas relief flutes in the chamber designed to help free the bloated cartridge casing from the chamber walls during extraction. Fluting the end of the chamber provides pressure equalization between the front outer surface of the cartridge case and its interior and thus ensures extraction without tearing the tapering part of the case of bottle necked cartridges. Metall- und Lackwarenfabrik Johannes Großfuß (Metal and lacquer ware factory Johannes Großfuß) chief designer Werner Gruner stated that gas relief flutes were present, his colleague Hans-Joachim Kaltmann denied this.

== Tests ==
First tests were undertaken in June 1944, but development dragged on and eventually only ten machine guns were built. During tests a MG 45/42V fired 120,000 rounds in succession at a cyclic rate of fire around 1,350-1,800 rounds per minute.

== See also ==
- Barnitzke machine gun
- CETME Ameli
- MG 60—post World War II derivative
