= SIG MG 710-3 =

MG 710-3
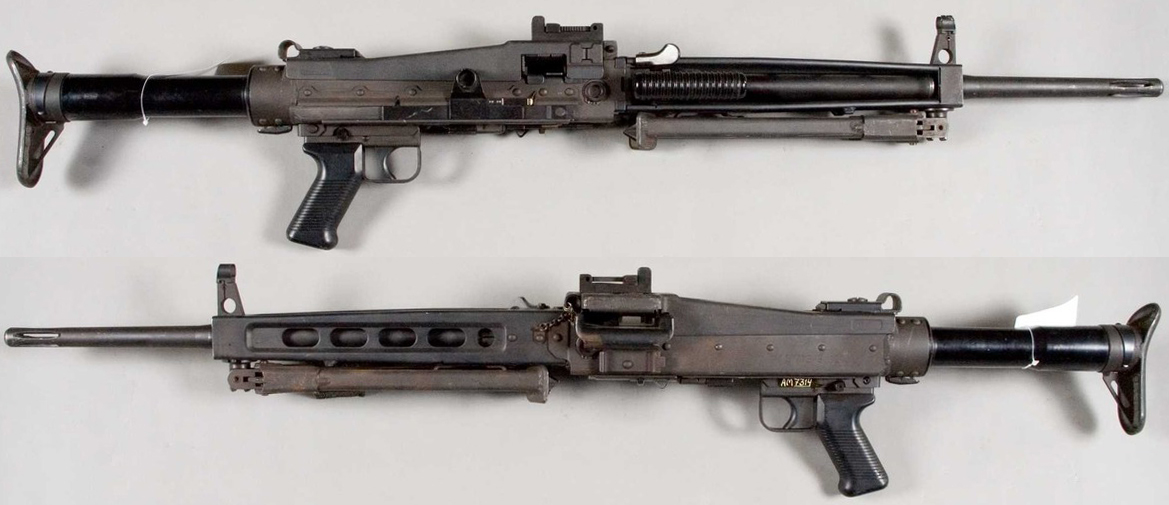
- A SIG MG 710-3 from the Swedish Army Museum.
- Type: General-purpose machine gun
- Place of origin: Switzerland

Service history
- Used by: See Users

Production history
- Designer: SIG
- Designed: 1955–1960s
- Manufacturer: SIG

Specifications
- Mass: 9.25 kg (20.39 lb)
- Length: 1,143 mm (45.0 in)
- Barrel length: 559 mm (22.0 in)
- Cartridge: 7.62×51mm NATO
- Action: Roller-delayed blowback
- Rate of fire: 800–950 rounds/min
- Muzzle velocity: 790 m/s (2,592 ft/s)
- Effective firing range: 100 to 1200 m sight adjustments
- Feed system: Non-disintegrating DM1 or disintegrating M13 linked belt
- Sights: Open type sights with rear sliding tangent

The SIG MG 710-3 is a Swiss 7.62 mm general-purpose machine gun (GPMG) designed and manufactured by SIG - Schweizerische Industrie Gesellschaft (currently Swiss Arms AG). The weapon was developed as a commercial venture primarily for export, since the Swiss Army had already adopted the 7.5 mm MG 51 GPMG (chambered for the 7.5×55mm Swiss Schmidt–Rubin rifle cartridge), produced by the federal arms factory W+F.

== Development ==
Work on the SIG MG 710-3 machine gun (initially designated the Model 55, changed in 1957 to SIG MG 710) began in 1955 and its design was influenced by the MG 45, a late World War II development of the German MG 42 machine gun. These efforts resulted in the SIG MG 710-1 (adapted to use the 6.5×55mm round) and the SIG MG 710-2 (with the 7.92×57mm Mauser cartridge), while the prototype for the final production version which would become the SIG MG 710-3 (chambered in a standard NATO 7.62×51mm caliber) was completed by the mid-1960s. As of 2010, the weapon was in use by the armed forces of Bolivia, Brunei, Chile and Liberia; despite being a Swiss design, the Swiss Army never adopted the gun.

== Design details ==
The SIG MG 710-3 is an automatic, air-cooled belt-fed weapon operated by roller-delayed blowback and fires from an open bolt. The machine gun's bolt differs from other contemporary designs employing the roller-delayed blowback method of operation (such as CETME and Heckler & Koch designed weapons), being a 3-piece design that consists of a bolt head with two locking rollers, a striker sleeve and the bolt carrier which is connected telescopically with the bolt head. When a round is chambered pressure from the return spring drives the bolt and carrier assembly forward; simultaneously both rollers engage camming surfaces which drive the rollers outward from their compressed travel position into recesses in the barrel extension. Upon firing, the bolt carrier and striker assembly recoil to the rear and the geometry of the fixed camming surfaces drives the rollers inward unlocking the bolt breech and increasing the speed at which the striker sleeve withdraws relative to the bolt. As the slower bolt continues rearward it impacts the returning striker sleeve (this impact decelerates the bolt).

The bolt assembly also contains the spring extractor, while a lever case ejector is located at the base of the feed tray. Spent casings are ejected downward. The weapon has a striker firing mechanism, a trigger assembly for fully automatic only fire and a cross-bolt safety (the "safe" setting disables the bolt catch).

The SIG MG 710-3 is fed from the left side by either NATO standard disintegrating M13 (United States) or continuous link German DM1 belt, but only after swapping several parts in the feed block. When used in a light machine gun role, the ammunition belt is stored in a sheet metal container that has a 50-round capacity and is attached to the left side of the receiver. The feeding mechanism resembles the one used in the MAG machine gun (a simplified version of the MG 42's feed system) operated with a feed arm driven by the motion of the striker sleeve. The belt is fed in two stages during both the forward and rear movement of the bolt assembly.

The quick-change barrel, ended with a slotted flash suppressor, has a fixed handle used to remove it. The machine gun uses three types of barrels: a light profile, heavy profile (in a heavy machine gun role), and special type (used for firing blank ammunition).

The firearm has a fixed stock (metal or wood), detachable bipod and open-type sights (rear sight is a sliding tangent with settings from 100 to 1200 m with 100 m increments). Used as a static heavy machine gun the weapon is placed on a SIG L810 tripod. It is also adapted to use an optical sight (with 2.5× magnification) or a night vision device.

== Users ==
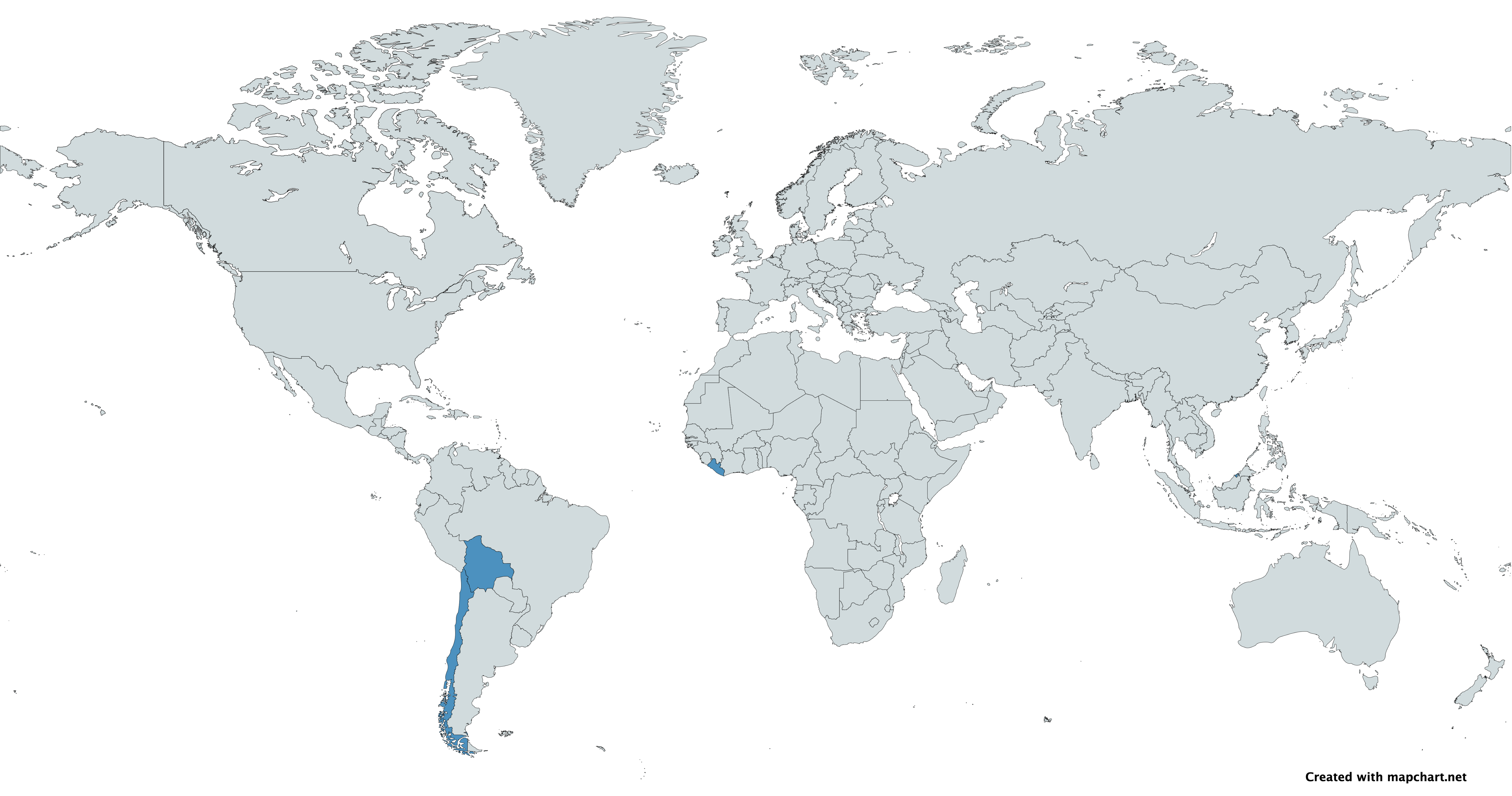
Map with SIG MG 710-3 users in blue

- Bolivia
- Brazil
- Brunei
- Chile
- Liberia

== See also ==
- List of delayed-blowback firearms
- Rheinmetall MG3
