= MG 42 =

German general-purpose machine gun

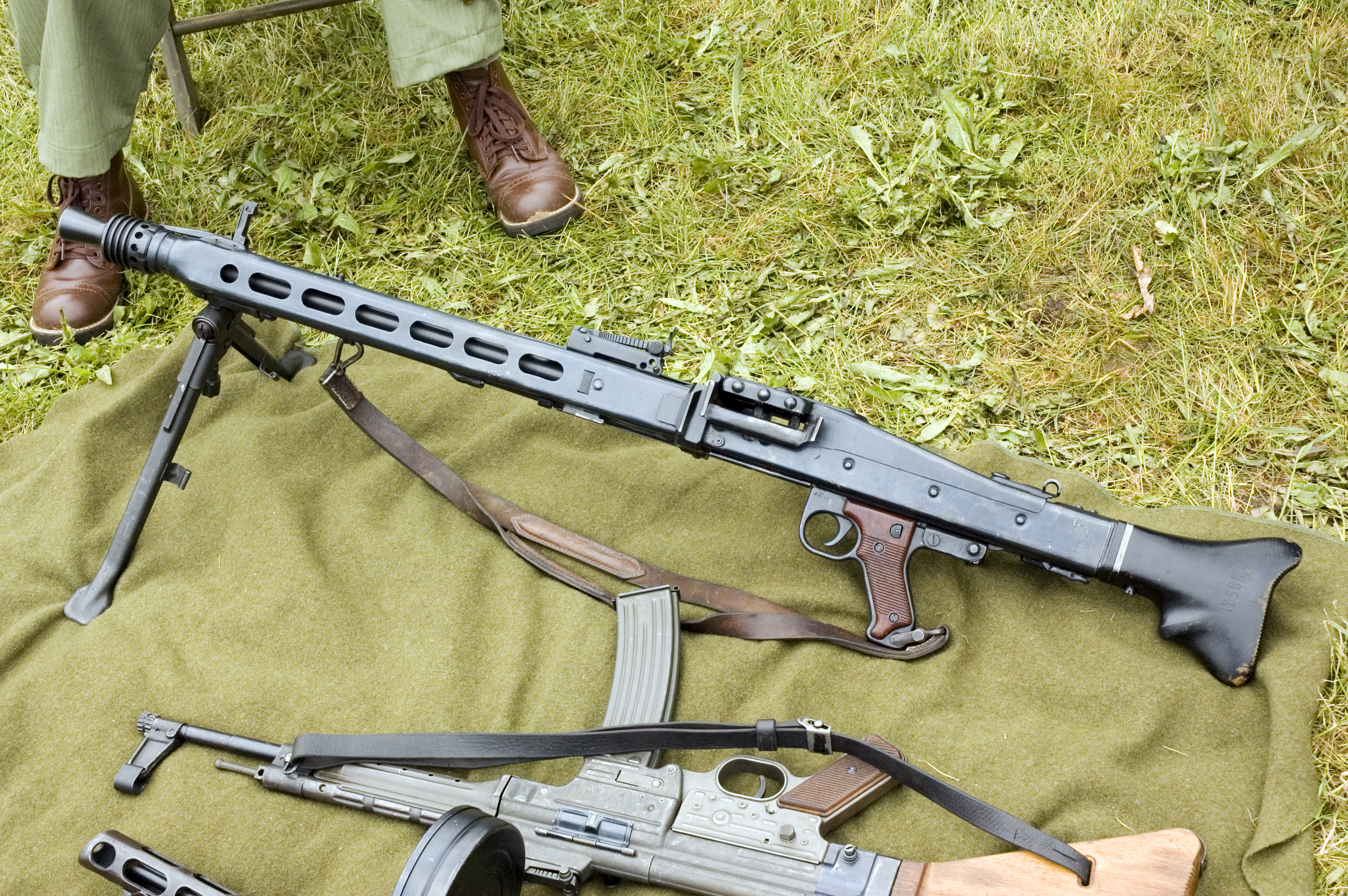
- MG 42 with extended bipod
- Type: General-purpose machine gun
- Place of origin: Nazi Germany

Service history
- In service: 1942–present
- Used by: See Users
- Wars: World War II; Guerrilla war in the Baltic states; Greek Civil War; 1948 Arab–Israeli War; 1958 Lebanon crisis; Algerian War; Bizerte crisis; Bangladesh Liberation War; Portuguese Colonial War; East Timorese civil war; Indonesian invasion of East Timor; Lebanese Civil War; Nicaraguan Revolution; Yugoslav Wars; First Congo War; Syrian Civil War

Production history
- Designer: Werner Gruner
- Designed: 1942
- Manufacturer: Großfuß AG; Mauser Werke AG; Wilhelm Gustloff Stiftung; Steyr-Daimler-Puch; MAGET (Maschinenbau und Gerätebau GmbH, Berlin-Tegel)
- Unit cost: 75 man-hours 250 ℛ︁ℳ︁ (1944) (equivalent to €52 in 2021)
- Produced: 1942–1945 (Nazi Germany)
- No. built: 423,600
- Variants: MG 45/MG 42V; MG 1; MG 2; Rheinmetall MG 3; M53; MG 74

Specifications
- Mass: 11.6 kg (25.57 lb)
- Length: 1,220 mm (48 in)
- Barrel length: 530 mm (20.9 in)
- Cartridge: 7.92×57mm Mauser
- Action: Recoil-operated, roller-locked
- Rate of fire: 1,200 rounds/min (varied between 900–1,500 rounds/min with different bolts); Practical: 153 rounds/min; Fully-automatic only
- Muzzle velocity: 740 m/s (2,428 ft/s) (s.S. Patrone)
- Effective firing range: 200–2,000 m (219–2,187 yd) sight adjustments; 3,500 m (3,828 yd) with tripod and telescopic sight
- Maximum firing range: 4,700 m (5,140 yd)
- Feed system: 50 or 250-round Patronengurt 33, 34, or 34/41 model belt; 50-round belt drum
- Sights: Iron sights, anti aircraft sight or telescopic sights

The MG 42 (shortened from German: Maschinengewehr 42, or "machine gun 42") is a German recoil-operated air-cooled general-purpose machine gun used extensively by the Wehrmacht and the Waffen-SS during the second half of World War II. Entering production in 1942, it was intended to supplement and replace the earlier MG 34, which was more expensive and took much longer to produce, but both weapons were produced until the end of World War II.

Designed to use the standard German fully-powered 7.92×57mm Mauser rifle round and to be cheaper and easier to manufacture, the MG 42 proved to be highly reliable and easy to operate. It is most notable for its very high cyclic rate for a gun using full-power service cartridges: it averaged about 1,200 rounds per minute, compared to around 850 for the MG 34, and 450 to 600 for other common machine guns like the M1919 Browning, FM 24/29, or Bren gun. This made it extremely effective in providing suppressive fire. Its unique sound led to it being nicknamed "Hitler's buzzsaw".

The MG 42 was adopted by several armed organizations after the war, and was both copied and built under licence. The MG 42's lineage continued past Nazi Germany's defeat, forming the basis for the nearly identical MG1 (MG 42/59), chambered in 7.62×51mm NATO, which subsequently evolved into the MG1A3, and later the Bundeswehr's MG 3, Italian MG 42/59, and Austrian MG 74. In Yugoslavia, an unlicensed, near-identical copy was produced as the Zastava M53.

The MG 42 lent many design elements to the Swiss MG 51 and SIG MG 710-3, French AA-52, American M60, the Belgian MAG general-purpose machine guns, and the Spanish 5.56×45mm NATO Ameli light machine gun.

== History ==
=== Before World War I ===
Even before World War I, the German military was already looking forward to replacing the heavy machine guns which proved to be such a success in that war. The MG13 was one of the first developments toward a goal of producing a weapon that could perform multiple roles, rather than just one. The MG13 was the result of reengineering the Dreyse Water-cooled machine gun to fit the new requirement. The twin-barreled Gast gun was developed with the goal of providing a high cyclic rate of fire weapon for anti-aircraft use which was reported to have reached cyclic rates of fire as high as 1,600 rounds per minute.

=== 1930s ===
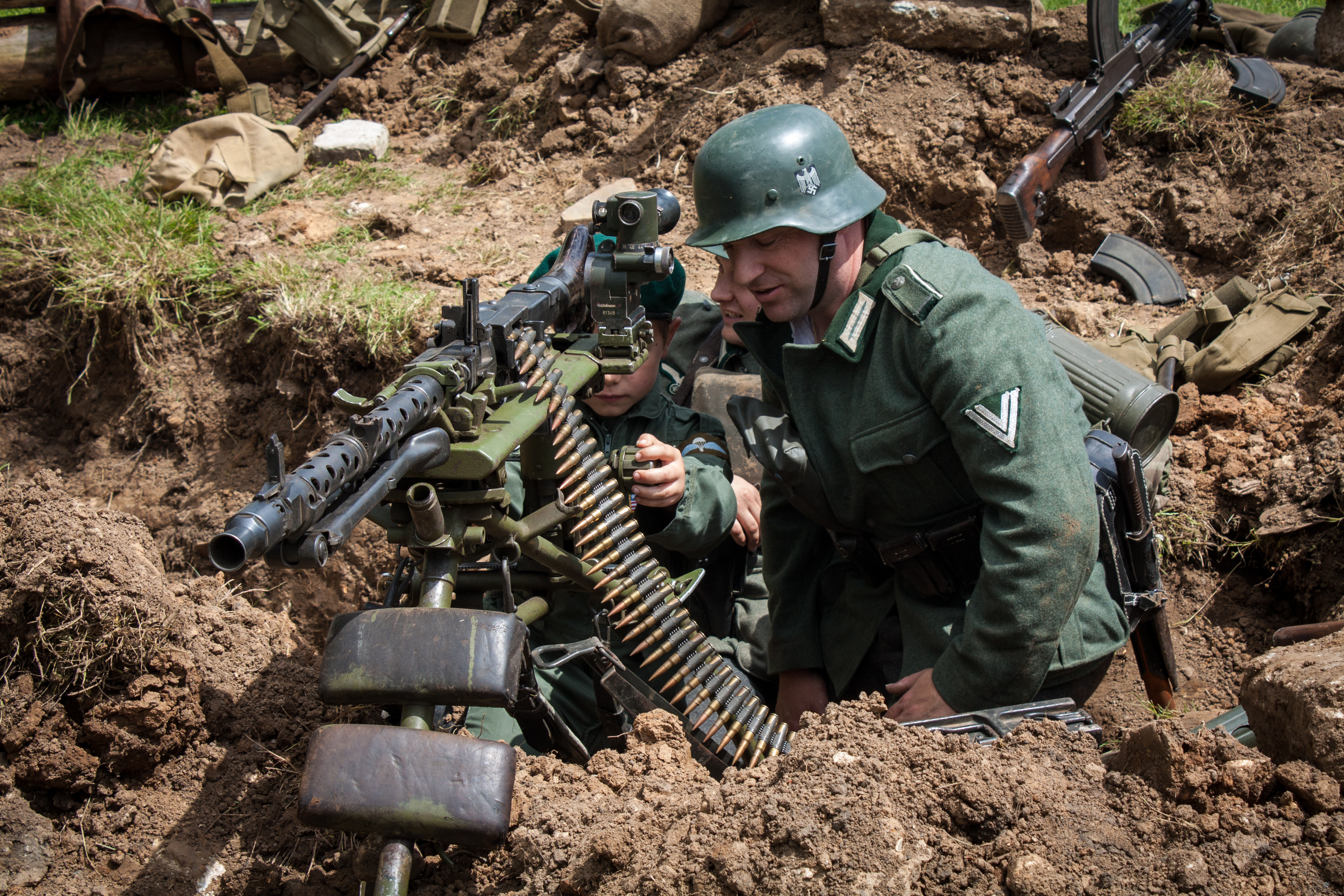
Wehrmacht reenactors with an MG 34 general-purpose machine gun mounted on a Lafette 34 tripod

This eventually led to the Einheitsmaschinengewehr (Universal machine gun) introducing an entirely new concept in automatic firepower. By changing its mount, sights and feed mechanism, the operator could radically transform an Einheitsmaschinengewehr for several purposes.

The MG 34 is considered to be the first modern general-purpose machine gun or Einheitsmaschinengewehr. It was developed to use the standard German 7.92×57mm Mauser full-power rifle round. It was envisaged and well developed to provide portable light and medium machine gun infantry cover, low level anti-aircraft coverage, and even sniping ability. Equipped with a quick-change barrel and fed either with non-disintegrating metallic-link belts, or from a 50-round Gurttrommel (belt drum) or a 75-round spring-loaded saddle-drum Patronentrommel 34 magazines (with a simple change of the feed cover for a Trommelhalter magazine holder), the MG 34 could sustain fire for much longer periods of time than other portable squad-level weapons such as the American M1918 Browning Automatic Rifle (BAR), Soviet Degtyaryov machine gun (DP-27) and the British Bren gun, which were fed by magazines, while also being much lighter and more portable than crew-served weapons like the Browning M1919, SG-43 Goryunov or Vickers machine guns (which also lacked quick-change barrels). The MG 34 was also quite versatile; not only was it able to be fed from belted ammunition or a saddle drum magazine, it could also be fired from a bipod, an innovative Lafette 34 tripod or various pintle mounts for armored vehicles. Switching between a bipod and a tripod required no special tools, as the mounting latch was spring-loaded. As the MG 34 Panzerlauf, it was used throughout the war as secondary armament on panzers and other vehicles.

However, the MG 34 did have fundamental drawbacks, such as sensitivity to extreme weather conditions, dirt and mud, and comparatively complex and expensive production. Attempts to incrementally improve the basic MG 34 design failed.

Between 1934 and the adoption of the final MG 34 production version, the Waffenamt (German Army Weapons Agency) realized the MG 34 Einheitsmaschinengewehr was too complex and expensive to mass-produce and started looking for ways to simplify and rationalize the technical concept.

=== Development of the MG 42 ===
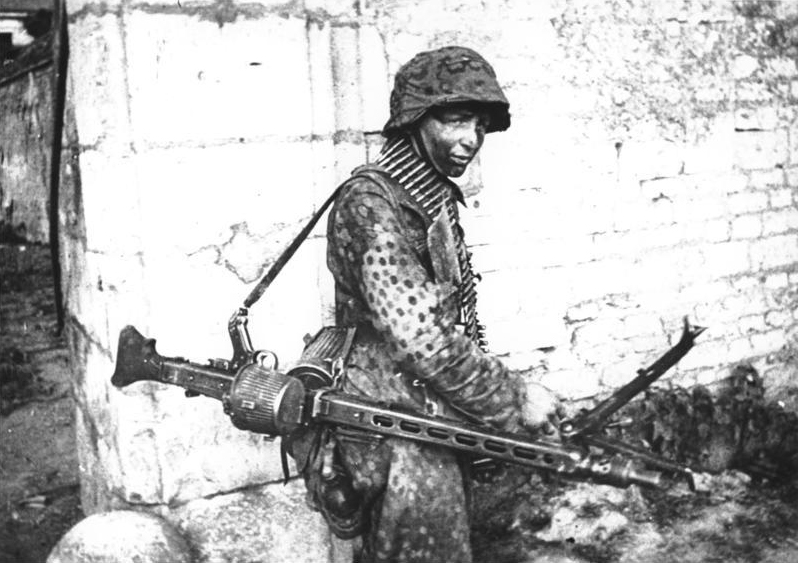
A Waffen-SS soldier in 1944 carrying an MG 42 configured as a light support weapon with a folding bipod and 50-round basket drum containing the ammo belt.

A draft specification was made and a contest was held for an MG 34 replacement. Three companies were asked in February 1937 to submit designs: Metall und Lackierwarenfabrik Johannes Großfuß AG of Döbeln, Rheinmetall-Borsig AG of Sömmerda, and Stübgen AG of Erfurt. The design and mock-up gun proposals were submitted in October 1937. Großfuß AG's entry proved to be the best design by far, employing a unique recoil-operated roller locking mechanism whereas the two competing entries used a gas-actuated system. The Großfuß company had no earlier experience in weapons manufacture, specializing in pressed and stamped steel components (the company's staple product was sheet metal lanterns). Dr.-Ing. Werner Gruner, one of the leading design engineers with Großfuß, knew nothing about machine guns when he was given the task of being involved with the project, although he specialized in the technology of mass production. Gruner would attend an army machine gunner's course to familiarize himself with the utility and characteristics of such a weapon, also seeking input from soldiers. He then recycled an existing Mauser-developed operating system and incorporated features from his experiences with army machine gunners and lessons learned during the early stages of the war.

Being made largely out of pressed and stamped appropriately hardened carbon steel metal, only the most important parts were elaborately milled from solid steel, and using spot welding and riveting to connect parts the new design required considerably less machining and fewer high grade steel alloys containing metals that became scarce in Germany during World War II. It was much simpler to build than other machine guns – it took 75 man hours to complete the new gun as opposed to 150 man hours for the MG 34 (a 50% reduction), 27.5 kg (61 lb) of raw materials as opposed to 49 kg (108 lb) for the MG 34 (a 44% reduction) – and cost 250 RM as opposed to 327 RM (a 24% reduction).

The initial trials of the Großfuß functional model presented in April 1938 gave rise to improvement requests by the machine gun contest board. The resulting Großfuß MG 39 prototype gun presented in February 1939 remained similar to the earlier MG 34 overall, a deliberate decision made to maintain familiarity and capability to use the various mounts and other accessories developed for the MG 34 to adapt the gun to different roles. The only major changes from the gunner's perspective were dropping of the saddle-drum-magazine feed option, leaving the weapon to fire belted ammunition, or from a single 50-round drum-shaped Gurttrommel belt container fitted to the gun's receiver, and simplifying the weapon's open sights for aiming purposes. All these changes were intended to increase, maintain, or accommodate the gun's high cyclic rate of fire and dispersion. Although made of relatively inexpensive and simple parts, the prototypes proved to be considerably more rugged and resistant to jamming than the precisely machined and somewhat temperamental MG 34. Further trials resulted in selecting the Großfuß MG 39 prototype gun for final production development. A limited run of about 1,500 of further improved MG 39/41 pre mass-production model guns, was completed in 1941 and by the end of 1941 tested in combat trials.

=== Adoption of the MG 42 ===
In early 1942 the final model of the weapon was officially accepted, and manufacturing of the mass-production model began, as the MG 42, contracts going to Großfuß, Mauser-Werke, Gustloff-Werke, Steyr and others. The MG 42 was first deployed in May 1942 by the Deutsches Afrikakorps (German Africa Corps expeditionary force in Africa) and introduced by mid-1942 on all fronts. Production during the war amounted to over 400,000 units (17,915 units in 1942, 116,725 in 1943, 211,806 in 1944, and 61,877 in 1945).

In 1943, MG 42 production surpassed MG 34 production and continued to do so until the end of the war. The Germans nevertheless continued widespread production of MG 34s in parallel until the end of the war.

=== MG 42 nicknames ===
The distinctive sound caused by the high cyclic firing rate gave rise to a variety of nicknames. The Germans called it the Hitlersäge (Hitler's Buzzsaw), Schnelle Spritze (Fast Sprayer), Knochensäge (Bone Saw), Tripperspritze (Gonorrhoea Syringe) and elektrisches MG (Electric MG). The Soviets called it the "Linoleum Ripper", and British and American troops called it "Hitler's Buzzsaw", or "Hitler's Zipper". Like the MG 34, British troops sometimes called it a "Spandau", a traditional generic term for all German machine guns, left over from the famous Allied nickname for the MG 08 Maxim-derivative used by German forces during World War I and derived from its manufacturer's plates noting the city of Spandau where some were produced. Brazilian expeditionary soldiers fighting in Italy used to refer to the MG 42 as Lurdinha; this nickname is due to the fact that the bride of one of the soldiers, named Maria de Lourdes, was a seamstress and the sound of MG 42 was similar to the sound of her sewing machine (Lourdinha is a common nickname in Brazil for women called Maria de Lourdes).

== Small arms doctrine ==
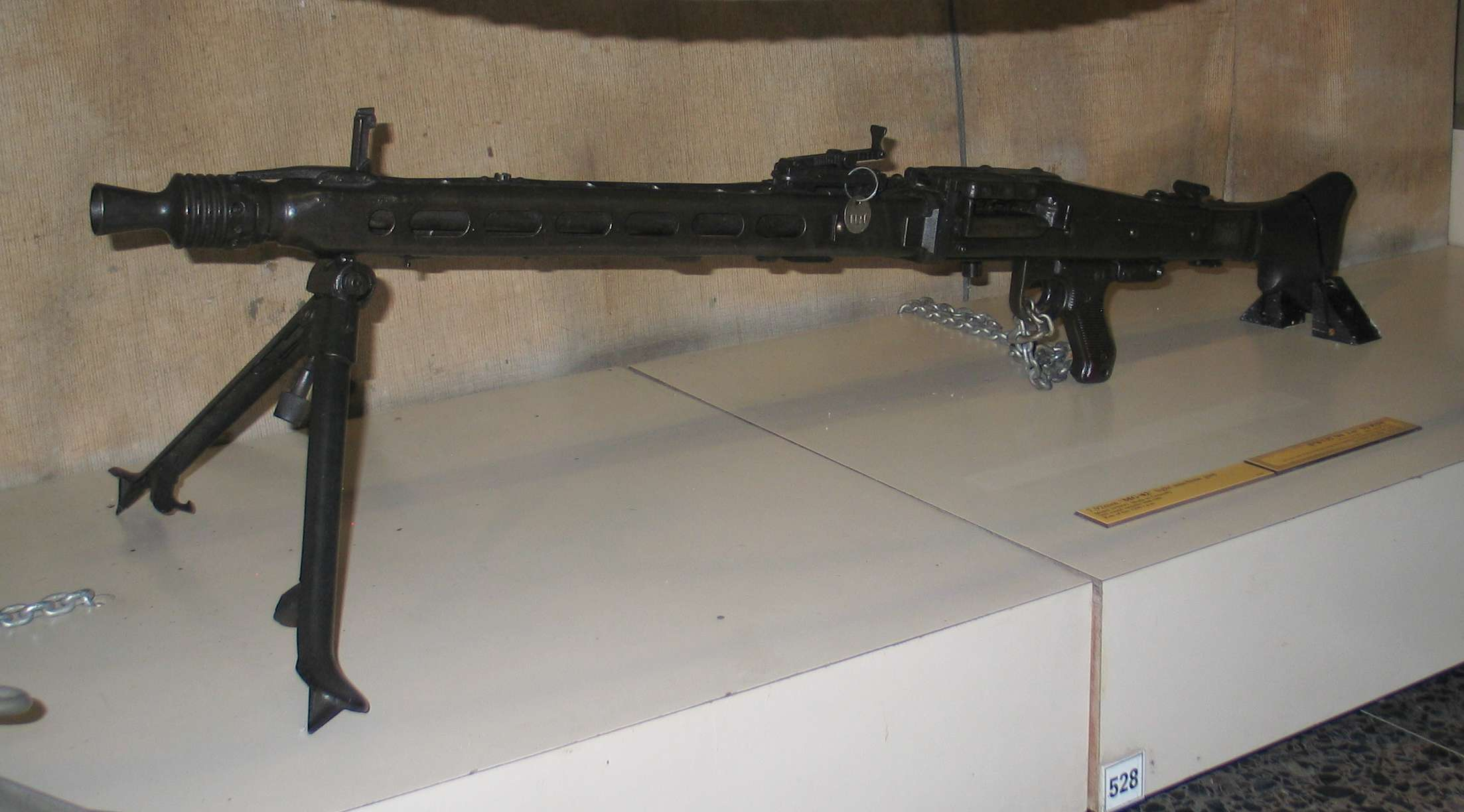
MG 42 with its bipod unfolded

The German tactical infantry doctrine of the era based a (10-man Gruppe) squad's firepower on the general-purpose machine gun in the light machine gun role. The advantage of the general-purpose machine gun concept was that it added greatly to the overall volume of fire that could be put out by a squad-sized unit.

Operating crews could lay down a barrage of fire, pausing only to reload or to replace the barrel, which could be done in less than 10 seconds. This allowed the MG 42 to tie up larger numbers of enemy troops than was otherwise possible. The Americans and the British trained their troops to take cover from the fire of an MG 42, and assault the position during barrel replacement. The (slower) rapid firing rate used in emergency/final defensive line situations of the MG 42 was up to 500 rounds per minute.

The Allied nations' infantry doctrines of World War II based a squad's/rifle section's firepower on the rifleman and a magazine-fed light machine gun (BAR, Bren, DP-27/DPM, FM 24/29) whose cyclic fire rates were typically 450 to 600 rounds per minute. The Allied nations had machine guns with similar rates of fire, but mounted them almost exclusively in aircraft, where the fleeting opportunities for firing made such high rates necessary. Weapons such as the M1919 Browning machine gun and the Vickers K machine gun, were only issued to infantry in specialized circumstances.

=== Light machine gun fire support role ===
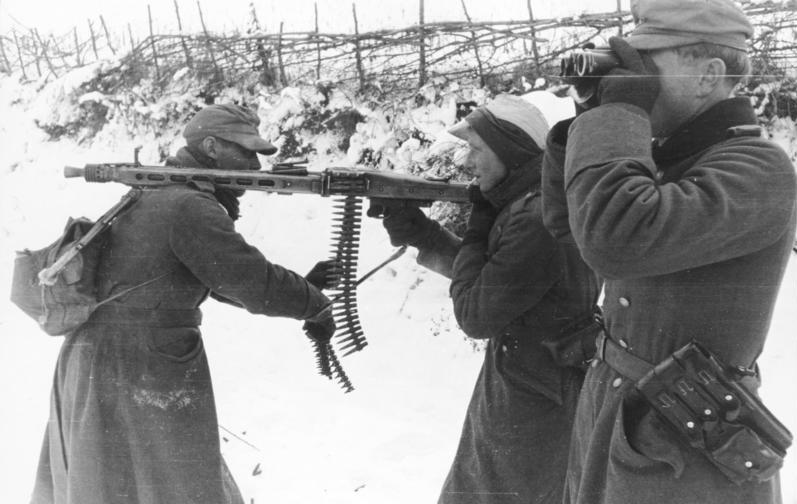
Machine gun team in Yugoslavia

A German infantry Gruppe (squad) at the start of the war consisted of ten men; a non-commissioned officer or Unteroffizier squad leader, deputy squad leader, a three-man machine gun team (machine gunner, assistant gunner/loader and ammunition carrier) and five riflemen. As personal small arms, the squad leader was issued a rifle or, around 1941, a submachine gun, the machine gunner and his assistant were issued pistols and the deputy squad leader, ammunition carrier and the riflemen were issued rifles. The riflemen carried additional ammunition, hand grenades, explosive charges or a machine gun tripod as required and provided security and covering fire for the machine gun team. Two of the standard issue bolt-action Karabiner 98k rifles in the squad could be replaced with semi-automatic Gewehr 43 rifles and occasionally, StG 44 assault rifles could be used to re-arm the whole squad, besides the machine gun. A full Gruppe (squad) carried 1,800 rounds of ammunition for the machine gun between them.

=== Medium machine gun fire support role ===
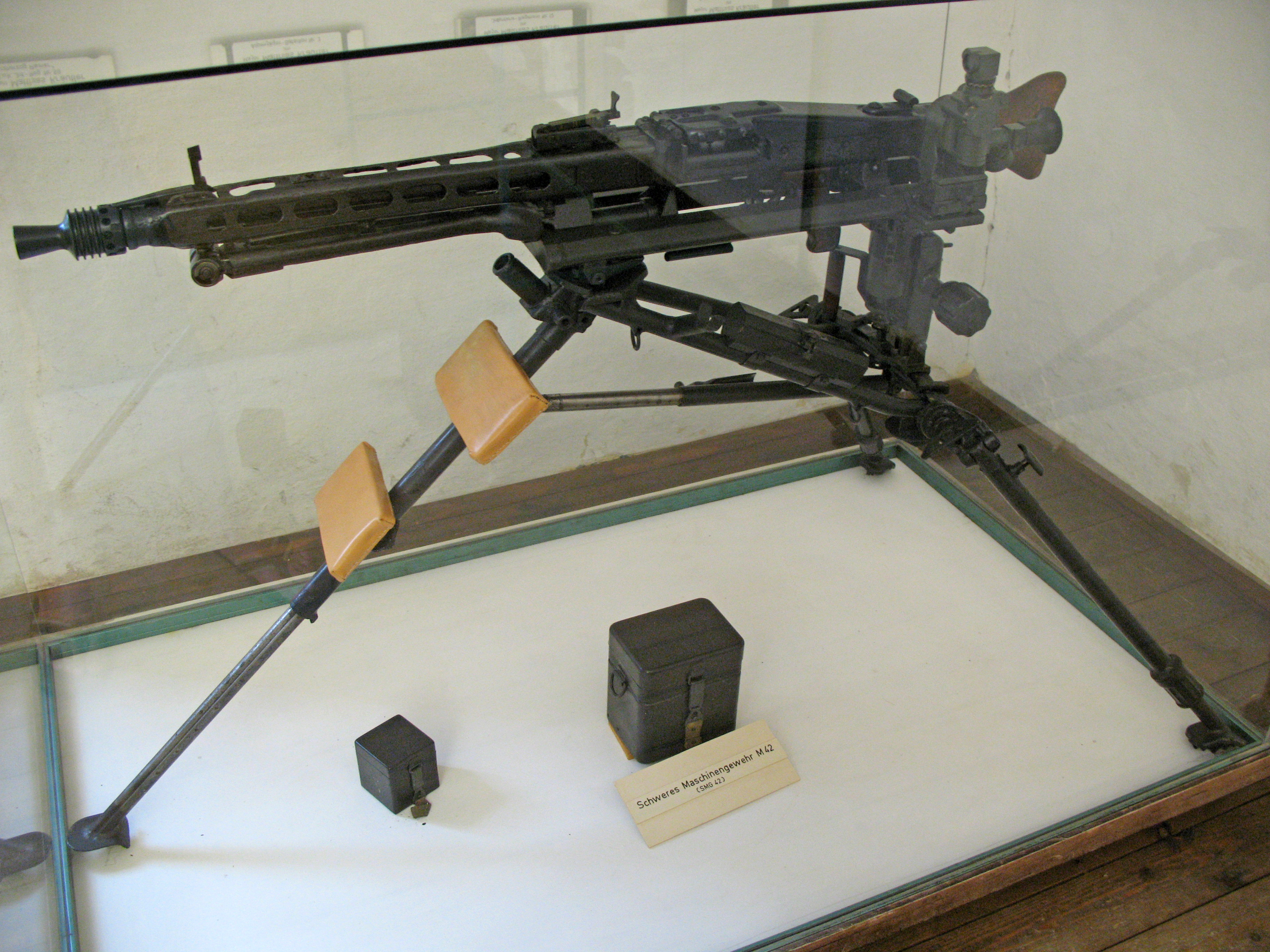
The MG 42 mounted on the Lafette 42 tripod with an added optical sight

In the German heavy machine gun (HMG) platoons, each platoon served four MG 34/MG 42 machine guns, used in the sustained fire mode mounted on tripods. In 1944, this was altered to six machine guns in three sections with two seven-man heavy machine gun squads per section as follows:

- Squad leader (NCO); MP40
- Machine gunner (private); MG 34/MG 42 and Walther P38
- Assistant gunner (private); pistol
- Three riflemen (privates); rifles
- Horse leader for horse, cart and trailer (private); rifle

The optimum operating crew of an MG 42 in its medium machine gun role was six men: the squad leader, the machine gunner who carried and fired the gun, the assistant gunner/loader who carried the tripod, and three riflemen who carried 1,800 rounds of ammunition between them, spare barrels, entrenching tools, and other items.

To enable the machine gun for its long-range direct fire and indirect fire support roles, optical sights could be added to a Zielfernrohrhalter (optical sight mounting bracket) on the tripod, allowing operating crews to continue using advanced planned and unplanned firing methods developed during World War I, though plunging fire or indirect fire methods were not as commonly used by machine gunners during World War II as they were during World War I.

== Operation ==
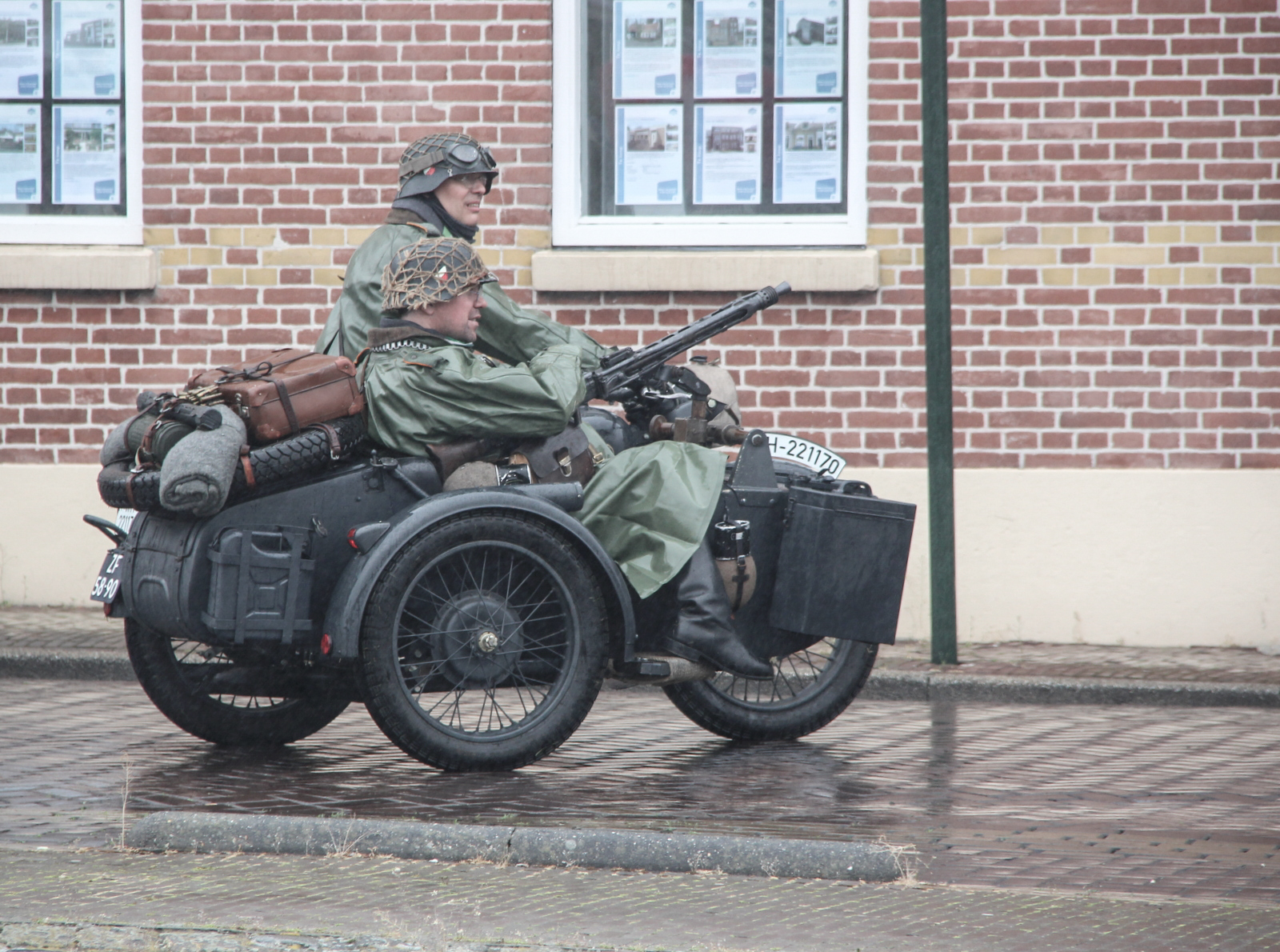
Wehrmacht reenactors with an MG 42 mounted on a motorcycle sidecar

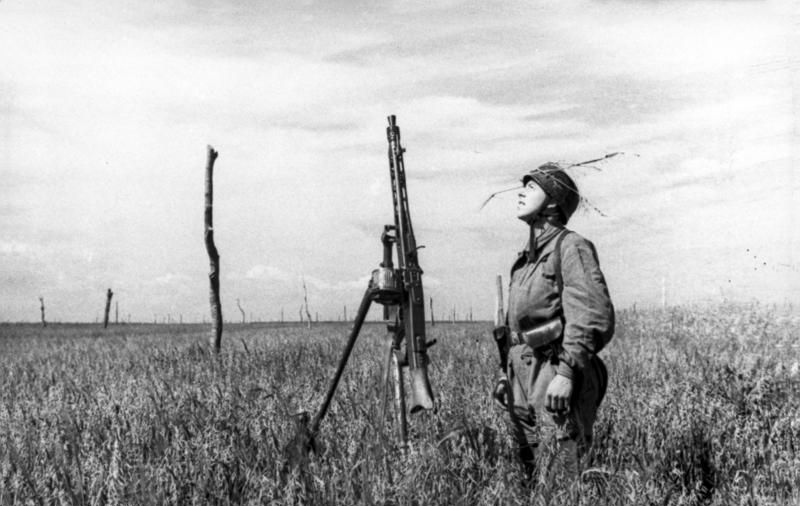
Dreibein 34 (a simple high-standing anti-aircraft tripod) mounted MG 42 in front of Rommel's asparagus against aerial invasion

One of the Einheitsmaschinengewehr (Universal machine gun) roles was to provide low-level anti-aircraft coverage. A high cyclic rate of fire is advantageous for use against targets that are exposed to a general-purpose machine gun for a limited time span, like aircraft or targets that minimize their exposure time by quickly moving from cover to cover. For targets that can be fired on by a general-purpose machine gun for longer periods than just a few seconds, the cyclic firing rate becomes less important. As a consequence, one of the MG 42's most notable features was its high cyclic rate of fire of about 1,200 to 1,500 rounds per minute, twice the rate of the Vickers and Browning machine guns, which fired at a rate of about 600 rounds per minute. The ear could not easily discern the sound of individual shots being fired, hearing a sound described as like "ripping cloth" or a buzzsaw.

The MG 42's high cyclic rate of fire sometimes proved a liability mainly in that, while the weapon could be used to devastating effect, it could quickly exhaust its ammunition supply. For this reason, it was not uncommon for all soldiers operating near an MG 42 to carry extra ammunition, thus providing the MG 42 with a backup source when its main supply was exhausted. Another disadvantage of the MG 42 was that the high cyclic rate of fire led to the barrel overheating quickly during rapid fire. After around 150 rounds of rapid fire, the gun operator would open a side hatch (leading to the barrel) and replace the hot barrel with a new cooler one. Non-observance of this technical limitation renders the barrel prematurely unusable. The machine gun crew member responsible for a hot barrel change was issued protective asbestos mitts to prevent burns to the hands.

The German military instructed that sustained fire must be avoided at all costs. They ruled that the results of sustained fire were disappointing and that the expenditure of ammunition involved was "intolerable." In the bipod-mounted light machine gun role, MG 42 users were trained to fire short bursts of 3 to 7 rounds and strive to optimize their aim between bursts fired in succession. According to comparative tests by the US military under battle conditions, 5 to 7 round bursts with 22 bursts in a minute were most effective. For its medium machine gun role, the MG 42 was matched to the newly developed Lafette 42 tripod. In this role, MG 42 users were trained to fire short bursts and bursts of 20 to 50 rounds and strive to optimize their aim between bursts fired in succession. As a consequence of factors like the time spent reloading, aiming, changing hot barrels if necessary to allow for cooling, the MG 42's practical effective rate of fire was 154 rounds per minute, versus 150 rounds per minute for the MG 34, a 2.3% increase.

== Design details ==
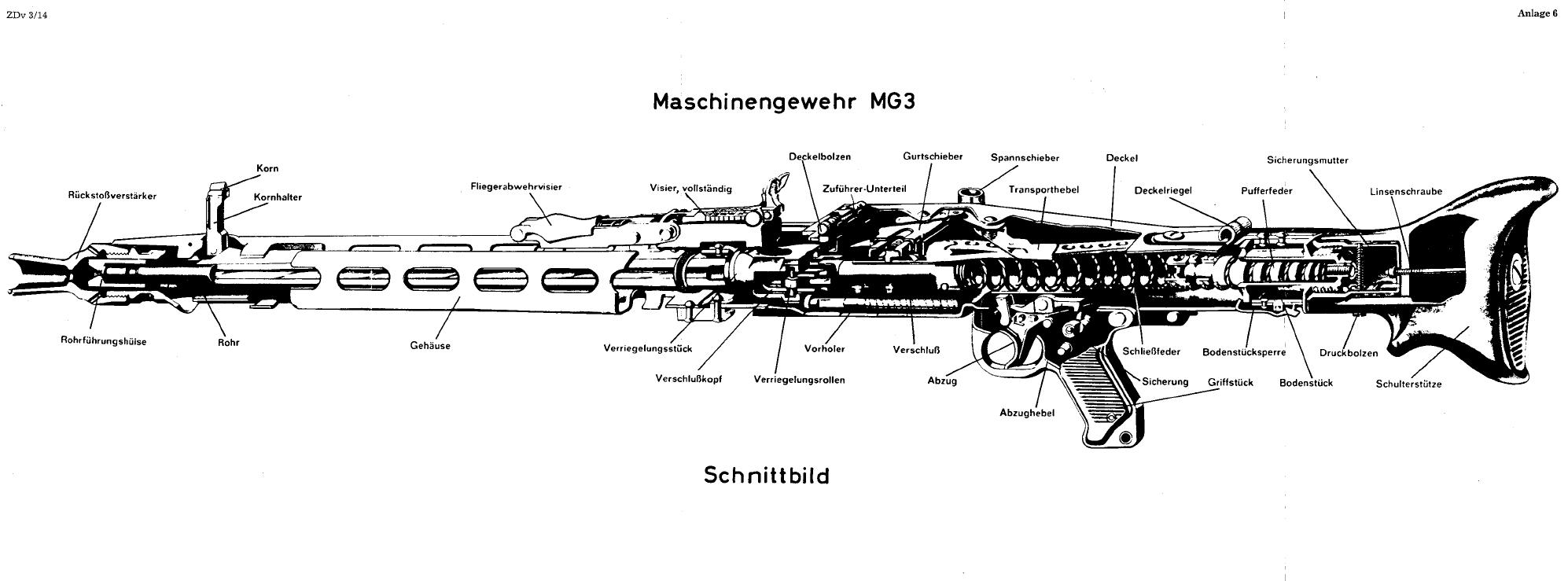
MG 42 based MG3 in 7.62×51mm NATO

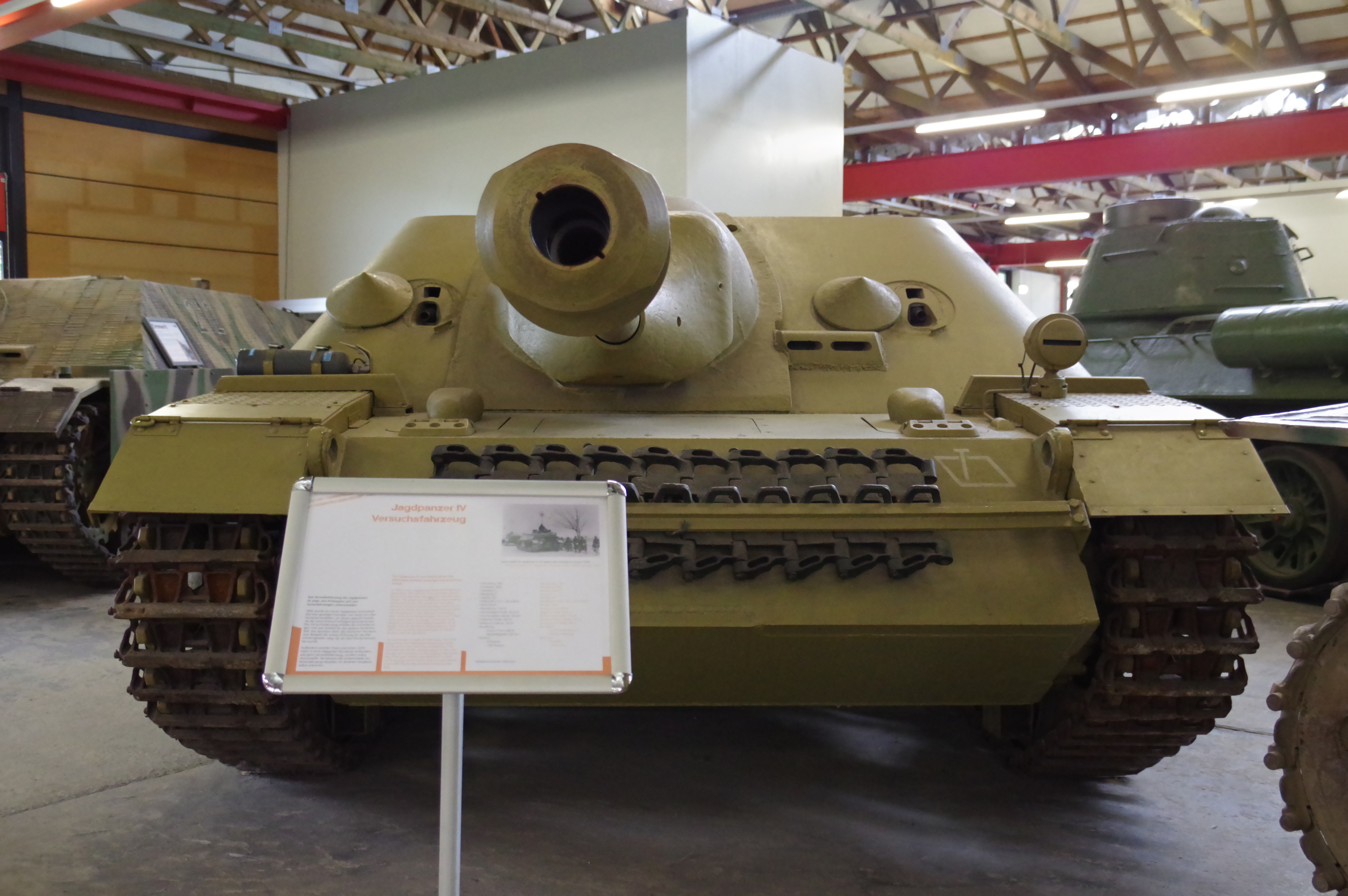
Jagdpanzer IV prototype with 2 opened front facing firing ports next to the main gun

The MG 42 is a 7.92×57mm Mauser, air-cooled, belt fed, open bolt, recoil-operated machine gun with a quick change barrel.

Its parts are attached to a 2.5 mm (0.1 in) thick stamped sheet metal housing that functions as the receiver and barrel sleeve.

It weighed 11.57 kg in the light machine gun role with the bipod, lighter than the MG 34 and easily portable. The underfolding bipod, the same one used on the MG 34, could be mounted to the front near the muzzle to minimize shot dispersion or the center of the gun near the balance point offering more flexibility depending on how and where it was being used.

The shoulder stock is designed to permit gripping with the left hand to hold it secure against the shoulder.

The MG 42 incorporated lessons hard-won on the Eastern Front. Both the cocking handle and the catch for the top cover to the working parts were designed so that the gunner could operate them wearing arctic mittens or with a stick or rod. This was vital for winter conditions where contact by bare flesh on cold metal could cause severe injury, such as instant frostbite. The MG 42 also functioned well in other climates; dust and dirt in North Africa and Italy was less likely to jam the MG 42 than the more temperamental MG 34.

The MG 42 is capable only of fully automatic fire. Single shots are difficult, even for experienced operators, due to the weapon's high cyclic rate of fire and the ability to fire a short burst of no more than three rounds was usually accepted as the training standard. The weapon features a recoil booster at the muzzle which adds extra rearwards force to augment that caused by recoil, thereby improving functional reliability and rate of fire. Besides amplifying recoil and managing and timing rearwards force exerted by propellant gas generated pressure, the recoil booster assembly ends in a muzzle shroud and also functions as a guide sleeve for the barrel and a muzzle flash arrester.

As the barrel of the MG 42 is changed through the side of the barrel shroud, rather than directly from the rear as in the MG 34, this made the MG 42 unsuitable for use as internal secondary or co-axial armament on World War II era German tanks or other armored vehicles, with the exception of the Jagdpanzer IV. Early versions of the Jagdpanzer IV carried two standard (no modification made) MG 42s on both sides of the main gun mantlet/glacis, firing through a firing port which was protected by an armored cover plate; the MG 42s were retracted when not in use. Later version Jagdpanzer IVs carried only one MG 42 as internal secondary armament.

The MG 42 belt-feed mechanism inspired the design used in the M60 machine gun. The trigger mechanism of the FN MAG or MAG-58 is a virtual copy of the MG 42's, and the FN MAG's belt-feed mechanism is also very similar.

=== Operating mechanism ===
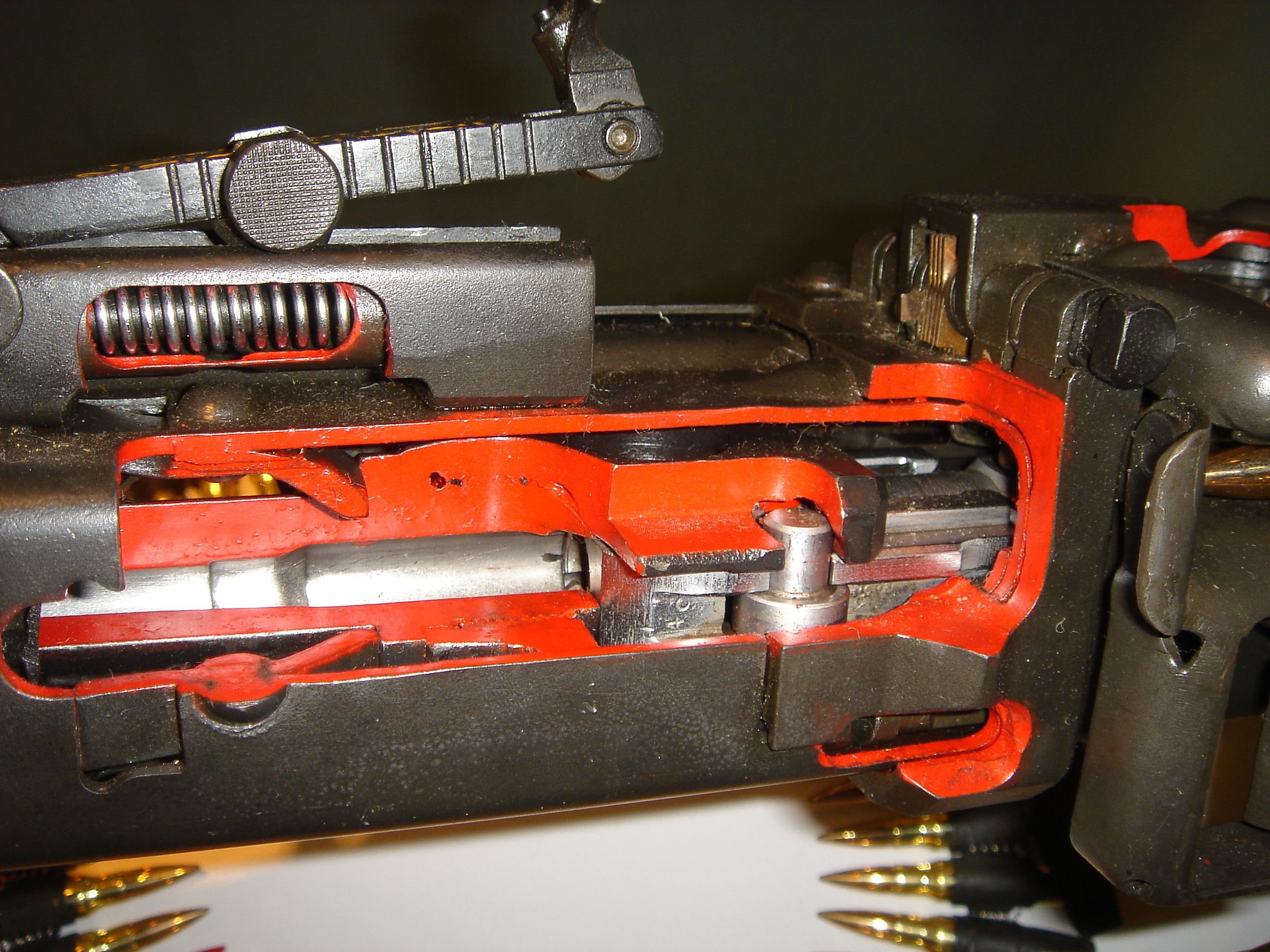
MG 42 roller-locked system

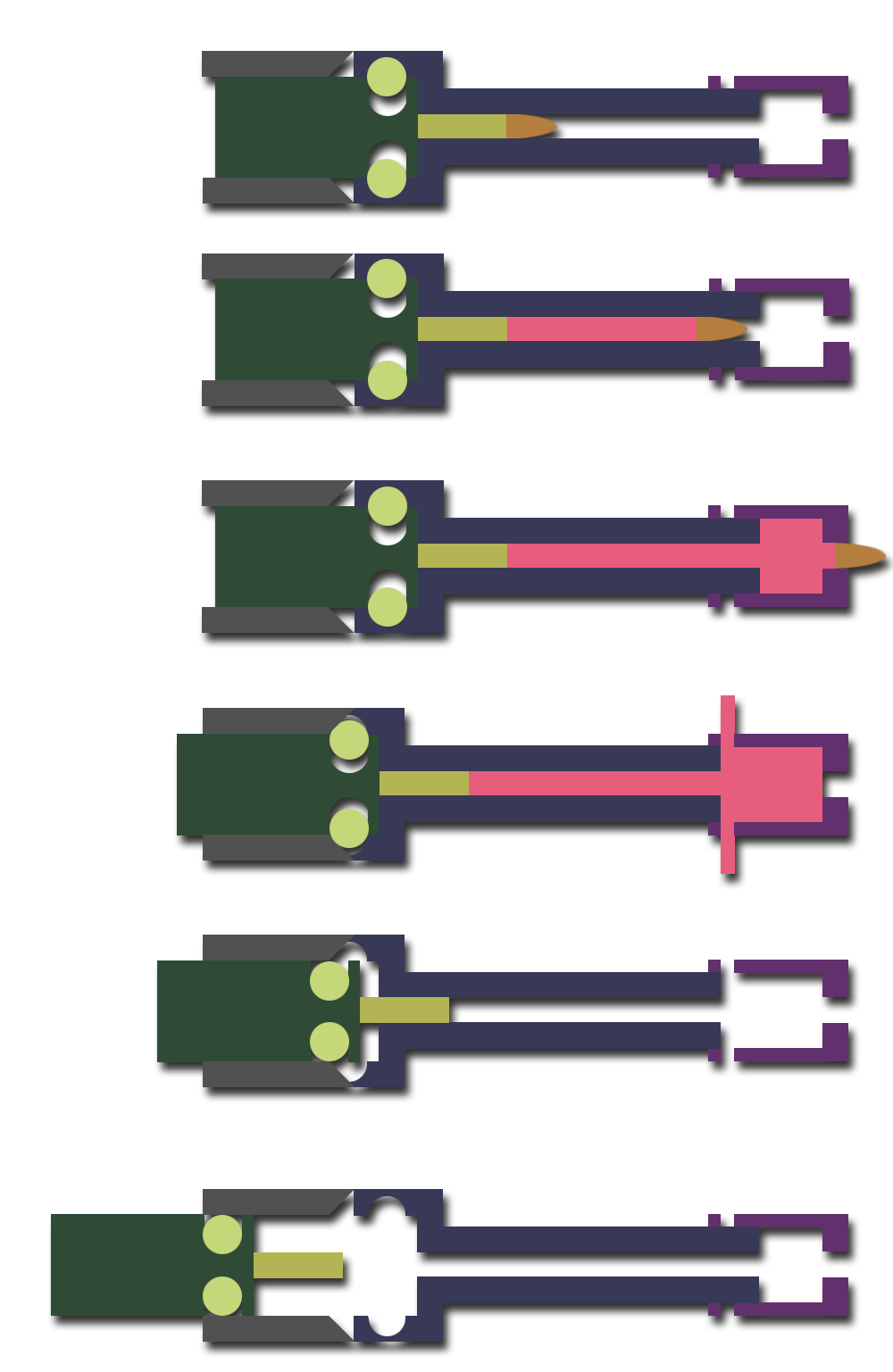
MG 42 roller-locked boosted short recoil action diagram

The roller-locked bolt assembly consists of a bolt head, two rollers, a striker sleeve featuring a wedge-shaped front, bolt body, and a large multi strands around a central coil return spring, which is responsible for pushing the bolt assembly into battery (the locked position) and returning it there when it is unlocked and pushed backwards by the recoil of firing or by the charging handle. As the striker sleeve is movable back and forth within the bolt assembly, the return spring is also responsible for pushing the striker sleeve forward during locking (described below). The bolt assembly locks with the barrel's breech (the end the cartridge is loaded into) via a prong type barrel extension behind the breech. As it is recoil-operated and fired from an open bolt, the weapon must be manually charged with the side-mounted charging handle.

The roller-locked recoil operation functions as follows: two cylindrical rollers, positioned in tracks on the bolt head, are pushed outwards into matching tracks in the barrel extension by the striker sleeve and lock the bolt in place against the breech. In the locked position during firing, the rollers rest on parallel surfaces relative to the bore axis on the bolt head ensuring a full lockup. Upon firing, rearward force from the recoil of the cartridge ignition combined with the additional rearward force generated by the muzzle booster start to move the barrel and bolt assembly rearwards for a total distance of 21 mm (0.8 in). These two parts start the unlocking sequence after the barrel and bolt assembly have moved 7 mm (0.3 in) rearwards when the parts have moved far back enough that the rollers start the rest on angled/oblique surfaces and allow the rollers to move inwards, controlled by the wedge-shaped front of the striker sleeve, back to their previous position, unlocking the bolt head and allowing the bolt assembly to further recoil rearwards, extracting the spent cartridge case and ejecting it downwards through an ejection port normally covered by a spring-loaded dust cover at the bottom of the receiver, just in front of the trigger group. The spring-loaded dust cover automatically opens when the gun is fired, but the user has to close it after firing to prevent dirt entering the receiver through the open port. Simultaneously, the barrel is pushed forward by a recuperator spring to its starting position. The three-wire braided return spring then pushes the bolt assembly forwards again, pushing a new cartridge out of the belt into the breech. The sequence repeats as long as the trigger is depressed.

The original MG 42 roller-locked action had an undesirable tendency to exhibit bolt-bounce. It was possible to unintentionally have high pressure gas moving backwards in the MG 42 towards the operator(s) when the action was not fully locked. This causes unacceptable dangerous conditions and out of battery ignitions can result in catastrophic gun failures. Enough guns were damaged and put out of action for repair or lost to warrant finding the cause and a solution. After investigation using high-speed photography, the rollers in the bolt were found to "bounce" back and forth or oscillate up to 1 mm (0.04 in) when lock up is proceeding and then they settle into full lock up. Once the problem was identified, the temporary solution was to design and manufacture extra sturdy ammunition with primers with a slightly slower ignition time which allowed the rollers to settle into lockup and issue that ammunition specifically for MG 42 use. A more practical solution to control the harmonics problem in the roller/wedge system and make the MG 42 less ammunition ignition timing sensitive was needed. The roller-locking system inherent problem was solved after World War II by developing and adding bolt-bounce preventing bolt catches to the action. (Note: The 7.62×51mm NATO chambered MG 3 predecessor MG 1A2 (known also as the MG 42/59) added new bolt-bounce preventing bolt catches to the action to resolve the ammunition ignition timing sensitivity of the preceding variants.) These can also be retrofitted to MG 42 bolts.

The cyclic firing rate of the MG 42 can be altered by installing different bolts and return springs. A heavier bolt uses more recoil energy to overcome inertia, thus slowing the cyclic rate of the machine gun. Heavy bolts also were used along with stiffer return springs. The standard MG 42 bolt weight for a 1,500 rounds per minute cyclic rate of fire is 505 g (17.81 oz).

=== Sights ===
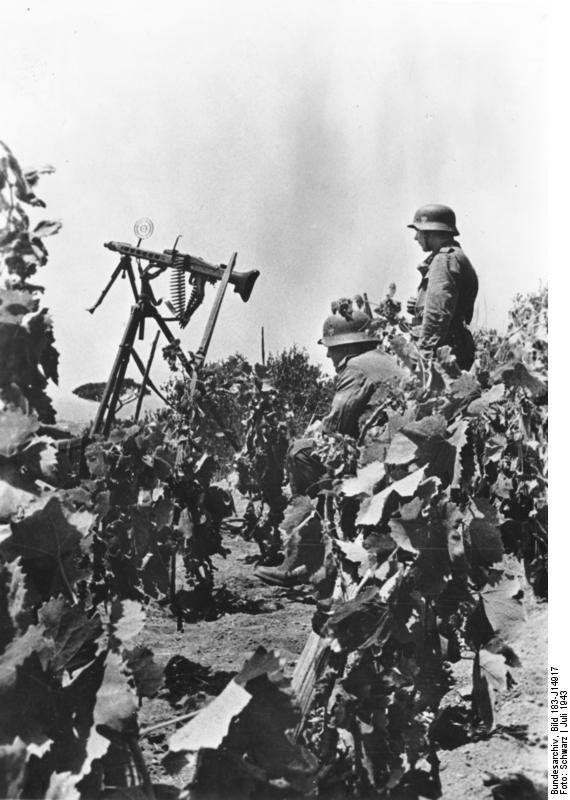
MG 42 with auxiliary anti-aircraft "spider web" ring sight mounted

The open-type iron sighting line has a relatively short 430 millimeters (16.9 in) radius and consists of a "∧-type" height adjustable front sight on a folding post and a leaf rear sight with an open V-notch sliding on a ramp, graduated from 200 to 2,000 meters (219 to 2,187 yd) in 100 meters (109 yd) increments.

An auxiliary anti-aircraft "spider web" ring sight is kept in the maintenance kit, that can be fitted on the barrel jacket to be used in conjunction with a folding anti-aircraft rear peep sight that is attached by a hinge to the rear sight element base.

An active infrared device, intended primarily for night use, and consisting of a specialized mount, active 300 millimeters (11.8 in) infrared spotlight and accompanying infrared image converter was developed that could be used with the MG 42 and MG 34. In the later stages of World War II the bulky Fahr- und Zielgerät FG 1250 (driving and aiming device FG 1250) active infrared unit was paired on Sd.Kfz. 251/1 Falke half-track armored personnel carriers to some MG 42 and MG 34 machine guns.

=== Feeding ===
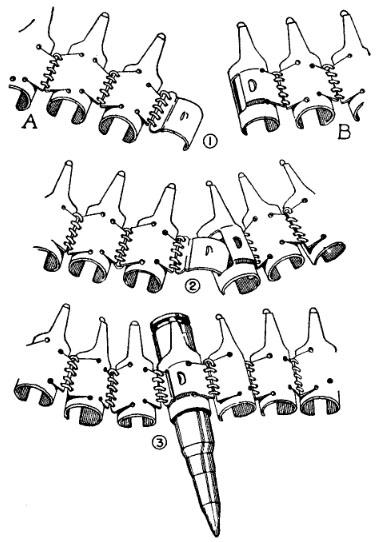
Method of joining German non-disintegrating metallic-link ammunition machine gun belts

The MG 42 could use non-disintegrating metallic-link belts, which have links that wrap around the cartridge case and are linked by a coiling wire on each side. The belts are intended for multiple reuse. As in the MG 34, operation through the feed block is by a feed arm housed in the feed cover. The feeding system was based on the direct push-through of the cartridge out of the belt link into the gun's chamber. Accordingly, the link had to be of the half-open type to enable the motion of the bolt through the link. New in the MG 42 was that two belt feed pawls are linked to the front end of the feed arm by an intermediate link, in such a way that when one pawl is feeding, the other pawl is riding over the next round in the belt. Because of that, feed is performed in two steps, on both the opening and closing movement of the bolt, instead of one step as in the earlier MG 34. This enhances the smoothness of the feeding process by improved ammunition belt retention for more precise indexing with the feedway and reduces mechanical stress put on the feed unit and belt links. According to Infantry Journal in 1947, the operating momentum driven MG 42 feed system will not function reliably under a cyclic firing rate of 850 rounds per minute.

During World War II the Gurt 34/41-belt family was introduced. Gurt 34/41 belt links and wire spirals were made of thinner material — the Gurt 34 links were made of 0.7 mm (0.028 in) and Gurt 34/41 links of 0.5 mm (0.020 in) thick stamped steel sheet metal — that saved ⅓ of metal and counterintuitively yielded improved performance. Belts were supplied in a fixed length of 50 rounds, but could be linked up to make longer belts for sustained firing. Ammunition boxes contained 250 rounds in five 50-round belts. A 250-round Patronengurt 33 belt was also issued to machine guns installed in fixed emplacements such as bunkers. Patronenkasten 34 and Patronenkasten 41 ammunition boxes could hold up to 300 belted rounds and were used in more static non-highly mobile situations. The Patronenkasten could contain an Einführstück belt starter-segment.

The Gurttrommel assault drum was an alternative feed option and designed to be clipped to the left side of the gun. It was not a true magazine but held a coiled 50-round belt and corresponding Einführstück starter-segment preventing it from snagging, twisting and getting stuck during mobile assaults. The Gurttrommel belt container was commonly used until the end of World War II, with the MG 42 and the earlier MG 34.

=== Barrel ===
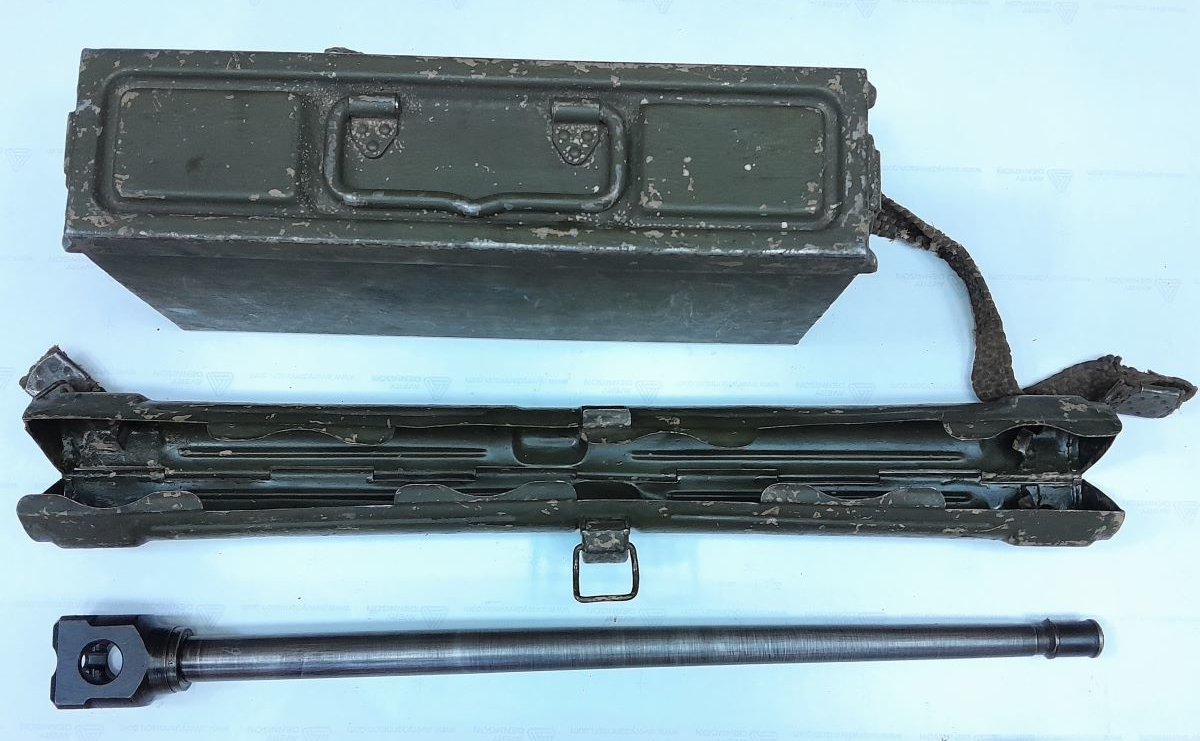
MG 42 spare barrel unit with an opened Laufschützer container and ammunition box

The 530 millimeters (20.9 in) long barrel and its prong type barrel extension used for lock up, made up the barrel unit of the MG 42. It could be quickly changed by the machine gun crew and weighed 1.75 kg (3.9 lb) including the locking piece. The barrels could have traditional rifling or polygonal rifling. Polygonal rifling was an outgrowth of a cold-hammer forging process developed by German engineers before World War II. The process addressed the need to produce more durable machine gun barrels in less time than those produced with traditional methods. Later produced barrel bores featured hard-chrome plating to make them more durable. The different versions meant that the service life of an MG 42 barrel varied between 3,500 and 8,000 rounds assuming the barrel was used according to the regulations, which prohibited rapid fire beyond 150 rounds. Excessive overheating caused by rapid firing about 500 rounds through a barrel resulted in unacceptable wear of the bore rendering the barrel useless.

For carrying and protecting spare barrel units, consisting of a barrel and its locking piece, the Laufschützer 42 (barrel protector) was used as a field accessory. When closed the Laufschützer 42 looked like a tubular container with mountings at its ends to attached a carrying/shoulder strap. During a barrel change a cool MG 42 barrel unit coming out of the Laufschützer 42 can be inserted in the machine gun and the replaced hot barrel unit can be placed in or on the opened Laufschützer 42 to cool down. The Laufschützer 42 was derived from the Laufschützer 34 that served the same purpose for MG 34 barrel units. Later in the war the universal Laufschützer 43 was introduced that could be used with MG 34 and MG 42 barrel units.

=== Lafette 42 tripod ===
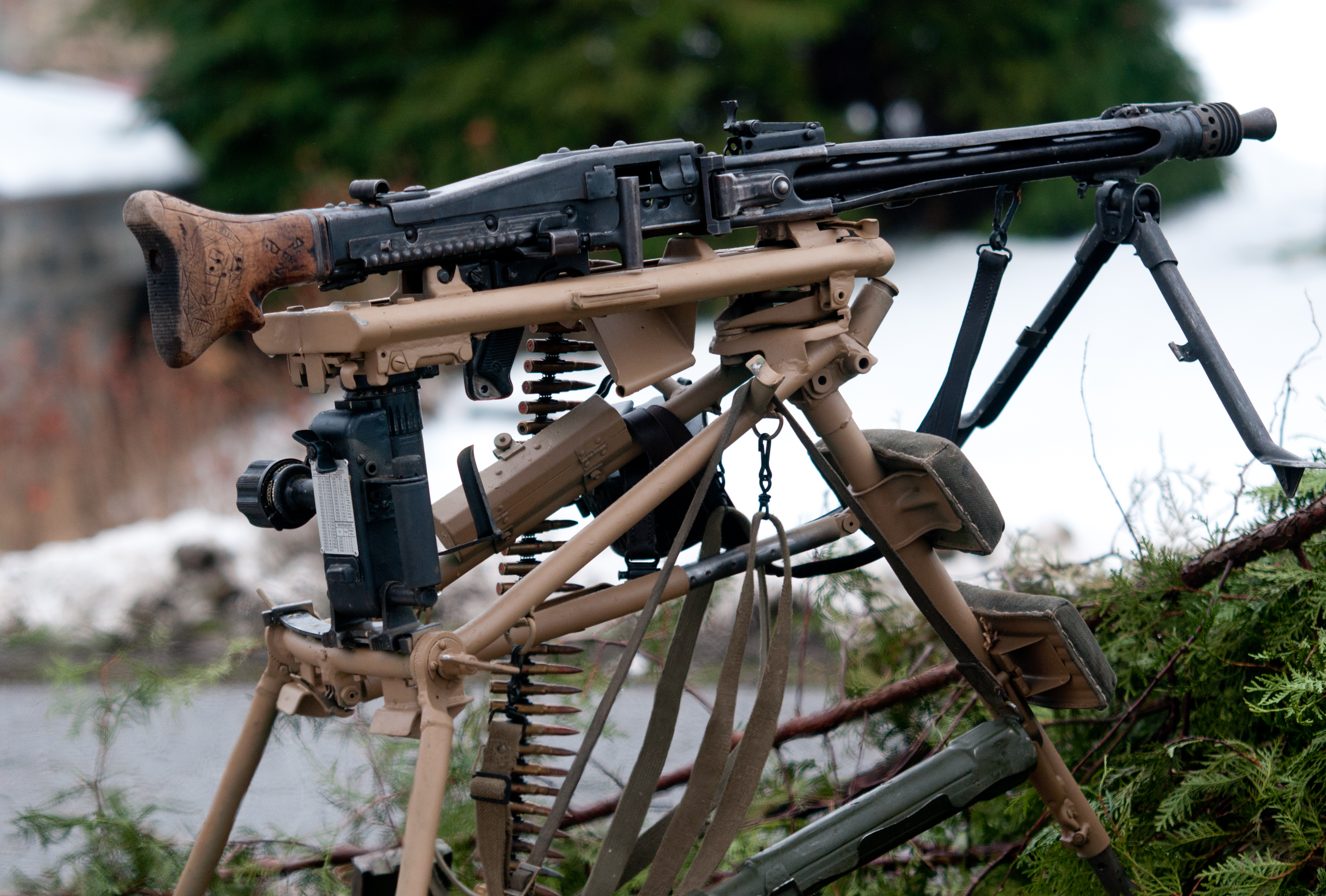
MG 42 mounted on a Lafette 42 tripod. The Richt- und Überschießtafel (Overhead firing table) is riveted to the rear body of the Tiefenfeuerautomat searchfire mechanism.

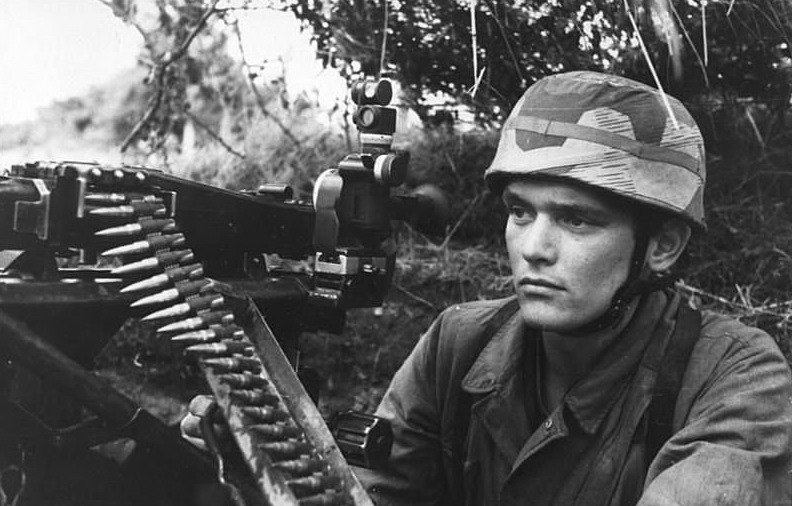
A German paratrooper MG 42 mounted on a Lafette 42 tripod with MG Z 40 telescopic sight attached

For the medium machine gun role a large tripod, the Lafette 42, was available that included a number of features, such as recoil absorbing buffer springs, a Zielfernrohrhalter (optical sight mounting bracket) for mounting an MG Z 34 or MG Z 40 periscope-type 4× power telescopic sight containing special sighting equipment for indirect fire, or the late World War II MG Z 44, designed for direct fire only. Fitting such an optical sight enabled the machine gun to deliver direct fire out to 3,000 m (3,281 yd). An accessory to lengthen these sights' periscope was available to use these sights behind cover. The Lafette could be set up in a prone, kneeling or high position. The Lafette 42 weighed 20.5 kg (45.2 lb) on its own and was a simplified version of the Lafette 34 used for the MG 34, as the MG 42 could be operated more easily from a Lafette and featured no semi-automatic firing mode. The legs could be extended with a Lafetteaufsatzstück to allow it to be used in the low level anti-aircraft role, and when lowered, it could be placed to allow the gun to be fired "remotely" while it swept an arc in front of the mounting with fire. Mounted to the Lafette and aimed through the MG Z 34 or MG Z 40 telescopic sight, the effective range of the MG 42 could be extended out to 3,500 m (3,828 yd) when fired indirectly. The indirect firing method exploits the s.S. Patrone useful maximum range, that is defined by the maximum range of a small-arms projectile while still maintaining the minimum kinetic energy required to put unprotected personnel out of action, which is generally believed to be 15 kilogram-meters (147 J / 108 ft⋅lbf). The Lafette 42 tripod also had a bolt box to store a (spare) bolt and return spring.

Another unique feature of German World War II machine guns was the Tiefenfeuerautomat feature on the Lafette 42 and Lafette 34 tripods. It lengthened the beaten zone by walking the fire in wave-like motions up and down the range in a predefined area. The length of the beaten zone could be set on the Tiefenfeuerautomat. E.g., being unsure whether the real distance was 2,000 or 2,300 m (2,187 or 2,515 yd), the gunner could make the mount do an automatic sweep between the elevations for 1,900 to 2,400 m (2,078 to 2,625 yd) and back. This sweeping of a selected beaten zone continued as long as the gun fired. The Lafette 42 had a Richt- und Überschießtafel (Overhead firing table) riveted to the rear body of the searchfire mechanism from the very start of production until the very end of it. In the later stages of World War II ballistic correction directions were added for overshooting friendly forces with S.m.E. - Spitzgeschoß mit Eisenkern (spitzer with iron core) ammunition of which the external ballistic behaviour started to significantly deviate from 1,500 m (1,640 yd) upwards compared to the s.S. Patrone (s.S. ball cartridge). A trigger handle, which enabled the operator to fire the gun without affecting the aim, was attached to the Tiefenfeuerautomat searchfire unit.

There were numerous other specialist mounts for the MG 42. The Dreibein 34, for example, was a simple high-standing tripod for mounting the gun in anti-aircraft mode. There were also mounts for various vehicles, motorcycle sidecars, and fortress positions. MG 42s were mounted in multiple-gun arrangements, particularly for low level anti-aircraft defence.

The butt-stock was produced in various wood and bakelite versions.

== Variants and developments ==
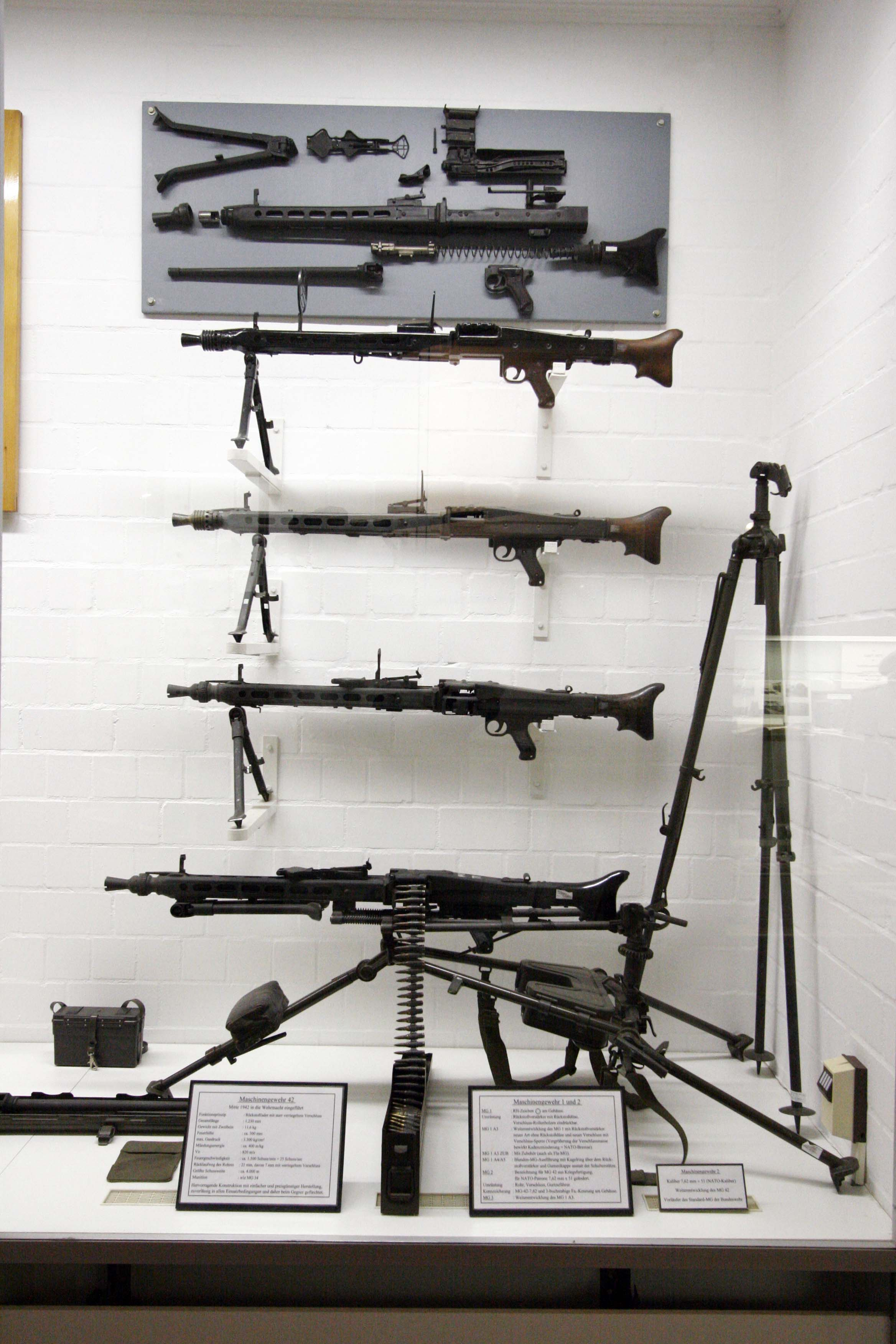
Various configurations of MG 42, including an anti-aircraft tripod (right)

=== Finnish MG 42 ===
Finland acquired five MG 42s in July 1943 for evaluation. Three were tested with front units. Finland planned to produce 4,000 MG 42s modified to fire 7.62×54mmR cartridges but only one modified prototype was ever made.

=== MG 45 ===
In 1944, the material shortages in Nazi Germany led to the development of a newer version, the MG 45 (or MG 42V), which had a different operating mechanism that used roller-delayed blowback as opposed to roller locking. For this reason, the MG 45 is considered a different type of firearm, as the mechanisms of these two guns are different. It used steel of lesser quality, which reduced weight to 9 kilograms (20 lb), while retaining the horizontal cocking handle. First tests were undertaken in June 1944, but development dragged on and eventually only ten were built. The tested MG 45 fired 120,000 rounds in succession at a cyclic rate of fire around 1,350 to 1,800 rounds per minute.

The MG 45 had some influence in the post-war development of roller-delayed blowback system, as employed in issued CETME, SIG, and Heckler & Koch small arms.

=== T24 machine gun ===
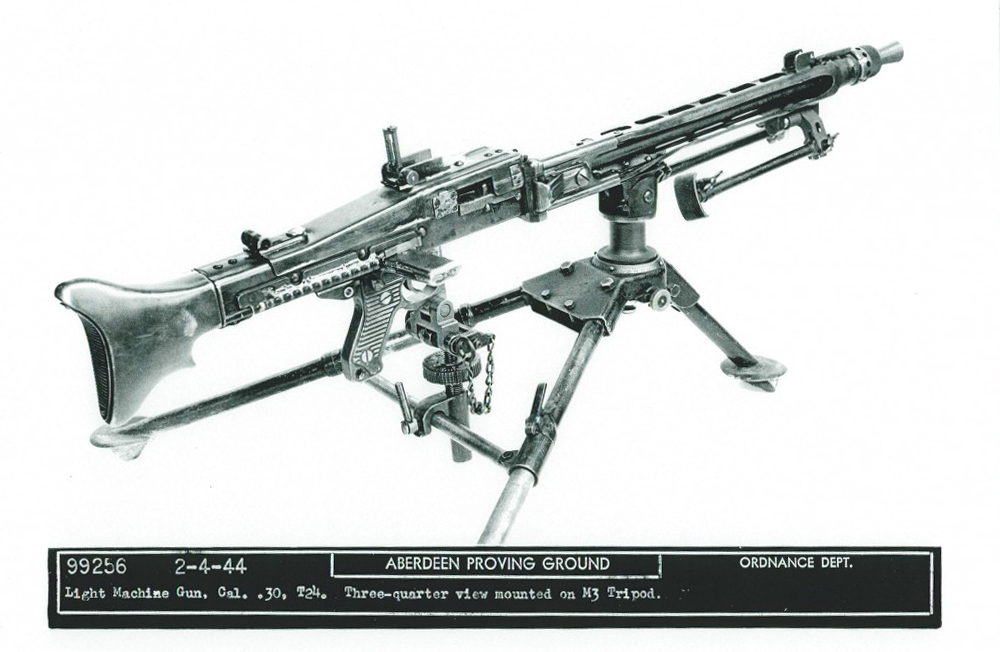
T24 machine gun prototype mounted on a tripod

The T24 machine gun was a prototype reverse engineered copy of the German MG 42 general-purpose machine gun developed during World War II as a possible replacement for the M1918 Browning Automatic Rifle and M1919A4 for infantry squads. The T24 was chambered for the .30-06 Springfield cartridge.

By February 1943, US ordnance authorities published the first report on the MG 42, following testing of a captured gun. The quick barrel changing and belt feed systems were considered some of the best design features. The US Army wanted to be able to manufacture this general-purpose gun because it was technically advanced and much easier to make than the World War II US light and medium machine guns and it was decided to convert several MG 42s to fire .30-06 Springfield M2 ball ammunition.

Saginaw Steering Gear Division of General Motors received a contract to construct two working converted MG 42 prototypes designated as the T24 machine gun. It could also be used on an M2 Tripod. The gun was made as an almost exact copy of the MG 42 which was chambered in 7.92×57mm Mauser. Some engineering changes were to use a barrel chambered for the .30-06 Springfield service round and an extremely increased weight 47 oz (1,332 g) bolt and stiffer return spring in an effort to reduce the cyclic rate consistent with US rate requirements. Saginaw Steering Gear did not adjust the prototypes for the 6.35 mm (0.25 in) longer .30-06 Springfield (7.62×63mm) cartridge case.

When one of the two T24 machine gun prototypes was fired at Aberdeen Proving Ground, it fired only one shot and failed to eject the cartridge. A second attempt had the same result. The other prototype was plagued with excessive ejection failures and to a lesser extent failures to feed. The average cyclic rate of fire of the tested weapon was 614 rounds per minute. From January to February 1944, testing at Aberdeen Proving Ground were unsatisfactory. Firings were discontinued in February 1944 after 51 malfunctions and firing a total of 1,583 rounds by authorization of Major C. Balleisen, O.C.O. In March 1944 the US military concluded that functioning of the T24 machine gun prototype was unsatisfactory and recommended that further development was required before this weapon be subjected to the lengthy and severe standard light machine gun test.

However, the realization that the .30-06 Springfield cartridge was too long for the prototype gun's mechanism to easily and reliably work with resulted in the discarding of the project. Saginaw Steering Gear did not get the opportunity to correct the flaws that caused the inability to obtain reliable uninterrupted automatic functioning and further optimize and ready the weapon for mass production before World War II ended.

=== MG 51 ===
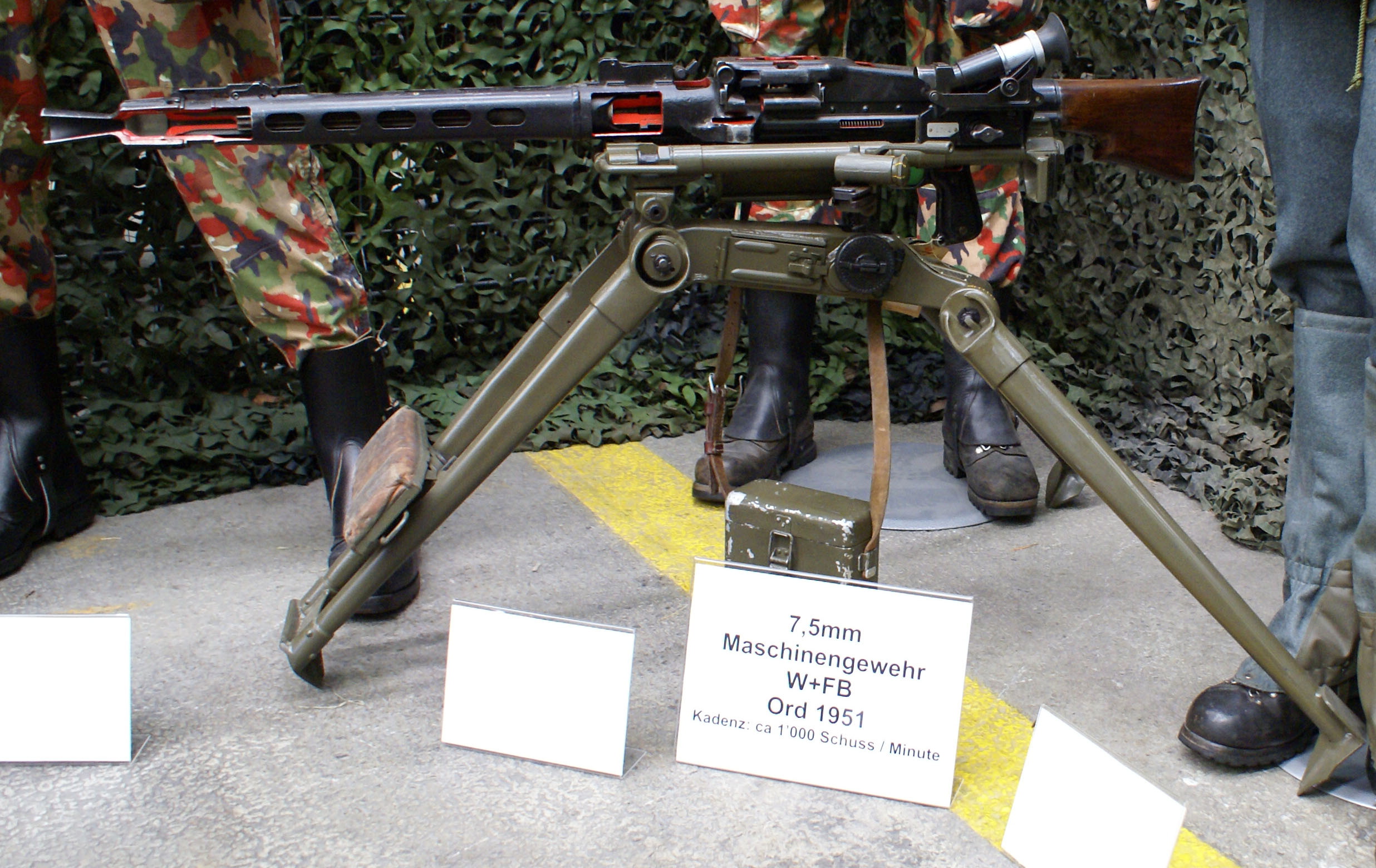
Swiss built W+F Bern MG 51

The Swiss MG 51 or 7.5 mm Maschinengewehr 1951 was based on the design of the MG 42 chambered for 7.5×55mm Swiss GP 11. The final design, which appeared in 1950, was in most respects still similar to the MG 42, although many components were produced by machining instead of stamping, which increased the weight, the stability and the production costs of the machine gun. To prevent short shots Waffenfabrik Bern changed the locking system from roller to flapper locking. These locking methods are similar in concept. The resulting weapon had a cyclic rate of fire of 1,000 rounds per minute, was in the light machine gun role 4.4 kg (9.70 lb) heavier than the German MG 42, and much more finely made and finished.

=== M53 ===
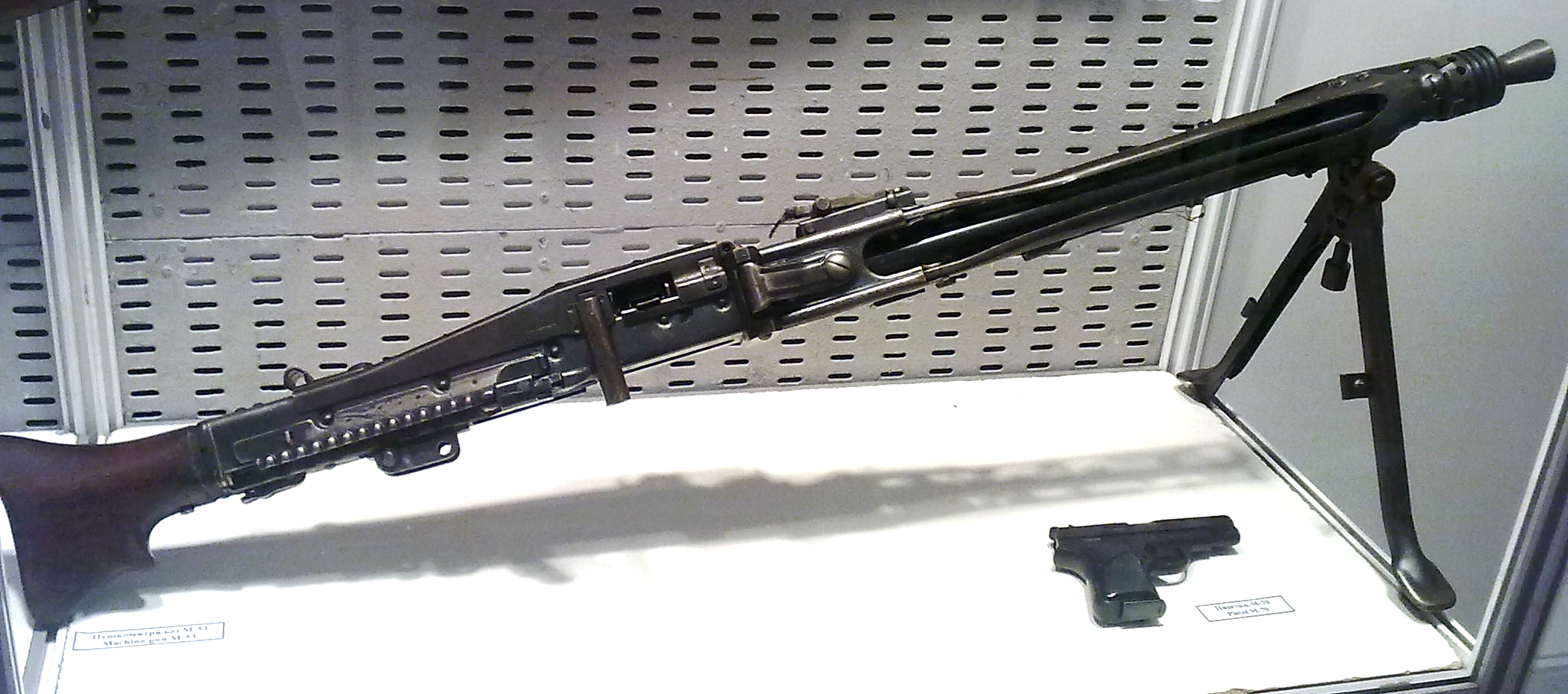
Yugoslav-built Zastava M53, a near exact copy of the MG 42. Note that the example in the photo is missing the trigger group.

In Yugoslavia, this MG 42 variant was built by the state-owned arms manufacturer Crvena Zastava as the Zastava M53 using original German machinery and retaining the 7.92×57mm Mauser chambering. By doing so, the Yugoslavs retained the original weapon's design features, making the M53 a near exact copy of the German MG 42. The only major differences were a slower 950 rounds per minute cyclic rate of fire and no anti-aircraft sight mount. The aiming range of the M53 is 2,000 m (2,187 yd), and the terminal range of the bullet is 5,000 m (5,468 yd), the same as the MG 42. The MG 42s captured in Yugoslavia at the end of World War II were put into reserve of Yugoslav People's Army as M53/42s. The last military use of M53s in Yugoslavia was in 1999. Some quantities of M53s were exported to Iraq in the 1980s and saw extensive action during both Gulf wars. The M53 was known under the nicknames Шарац (Šarac) and Garonja.

=== MG 3 ===
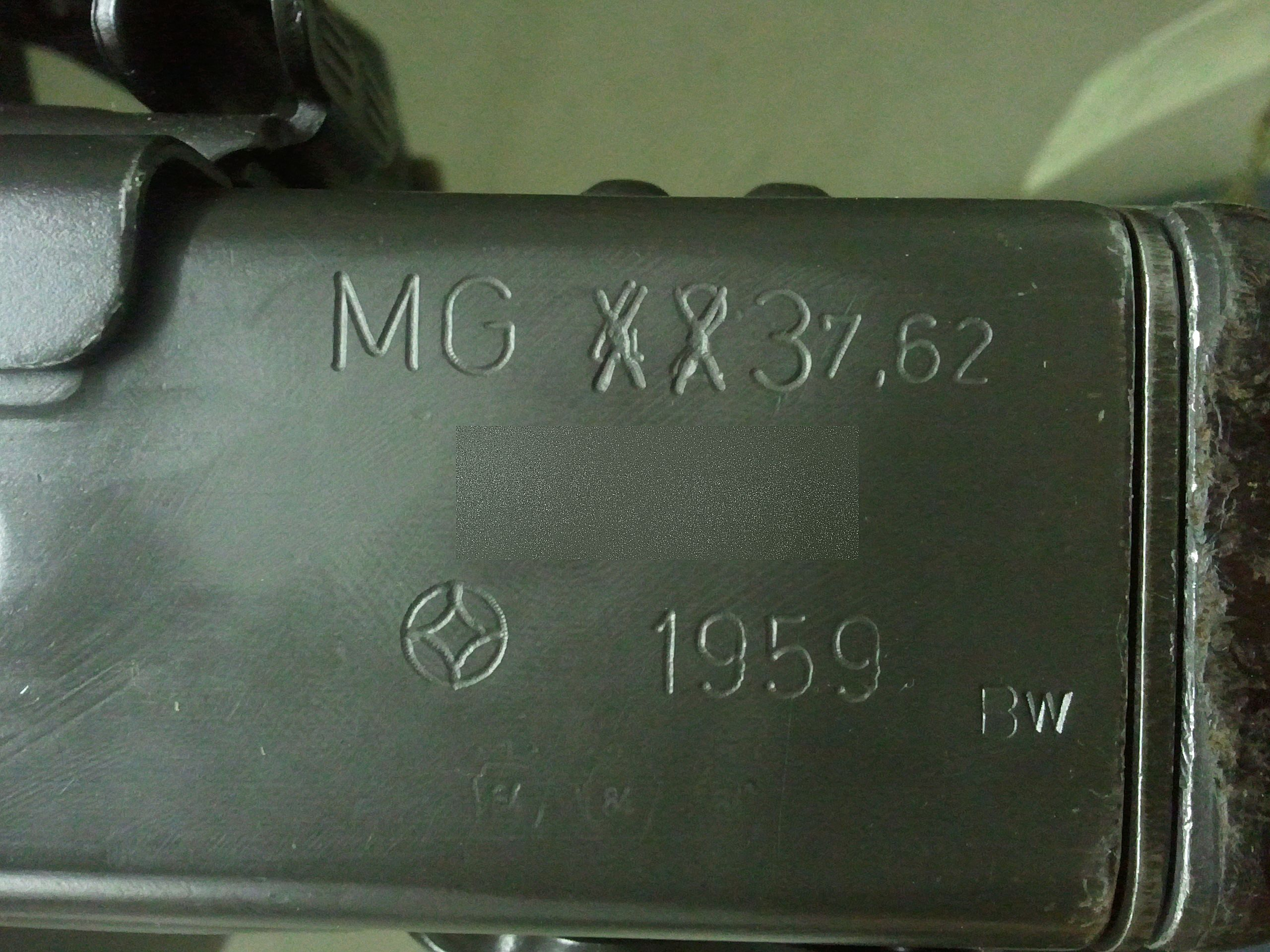
Markings on an original MG 42 retrofitted to a MG 3

At the end of World War II the original technical drawings and data for the MG 42 were captured by the Soviets. These would eventually find their way to Czechoslovakia and Yugoslavia. This forced Rheinmetall to reverse engineer the MG 42 for the development of the MG 3 (originally the MG 1 launched in 1958), which uses the MG 42 design but was rechambered to 7.62×51mm NATO. It remained a primary general-purpose machine gun of the modern German armed forces (Bundeswehr) until it was replaced by the Heckler & Koch MG5 during the 2020s. The MG 3 has been used by more than 40 countries around the world, and it remains in widespread service today.

The MG 3 and its preceding variants all share a high level of parts interchangeability with the original MG 42. Like the MG 42, the MG 3 cyclic rates of fire can be altered by exchanging the standard weight (about 650 g (22.93 oz)) bolt used for the standard 1,100–1,300 rounds per minute rate of fire for an extra weight (about 900 g (31.75 oz)) bolt for a reduced 800–950 rounds per minute rate of fire. Those bolts also are used along with different recoil springs.

The Italian MG 42/59 licensed MG 3 variant produced by Beretta, Whitehead Motofides and Franchi since 1959, features an extremely heavy 1,200 g (42.33 oz) bolt which reduces the cyclic rate of fire to around 800 rounds per minute.

=== MG 74 ===
The final variant to date is the MG 74, developed by Austria and since 1974 it is the standard machine gun of the Austrian Armed Forces.

After its founding in 1955, the Austrian army was temporarily equipped with old guns out of U.S. stocks. Starting in 1959 these Browning M1919s were largely replaced by the MG 42 with modified barrel and bolt for the new 7.62×51mm NATO. To introduce a modern weapon of its own production the Office of Defence Technology, in cooperation with Steyr Mannlicher and Beretta developed a gun specifically for the Austrian Army. The German MG 42/59 that was introduced in 1959 with the Bundeswehr to replace the U.S. machine guns, served as the basis, which was similar to the Austrian 7.62 mm MG 42. Targets were to reduce, among other things, the cyclic rate of fire and weight and have more versatile sights and mount. The development of the weapon was completed in 1974. It replaced from this year the MG 42 as the MG 74 of the Austrian Federal Army.

The modifications to the basic MG 42 design include an extra heavy bolt (950 g (33.51 oz) vs. the 675 g (23.81 oz) MG 3 bolt) which reduces the cyclic rate of fire to around 850 rounds per minute. The rate of fire can be varied up to cyclic rate of fire of around 1,150 rounds per minute, if necessary, by changing the bolt and return spring. In addition, a select fire trigger group was added to allow semi-automatic fire (single shot) compared to the traditional fully automatic only fire capability of the original MG 42 design. The MG 74 also has a modern polymer stock and handgrips (usually colored green) to save weight, adjustable rear sight (35° horizontal, vertical 15°) and additional anti-aircraft sight or (low light) optical sights can be mounted optional.

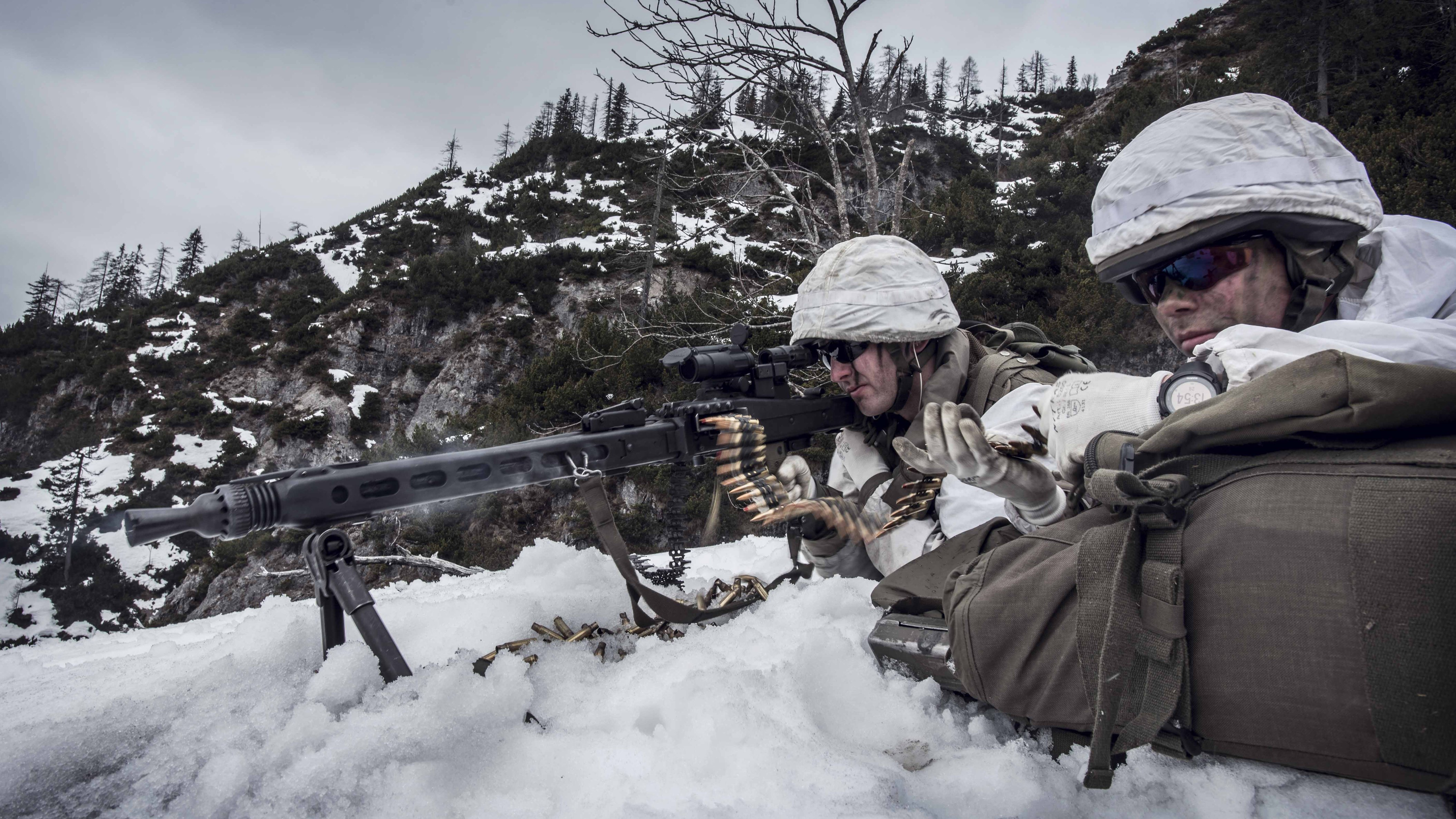
Bipod mounted light fire support

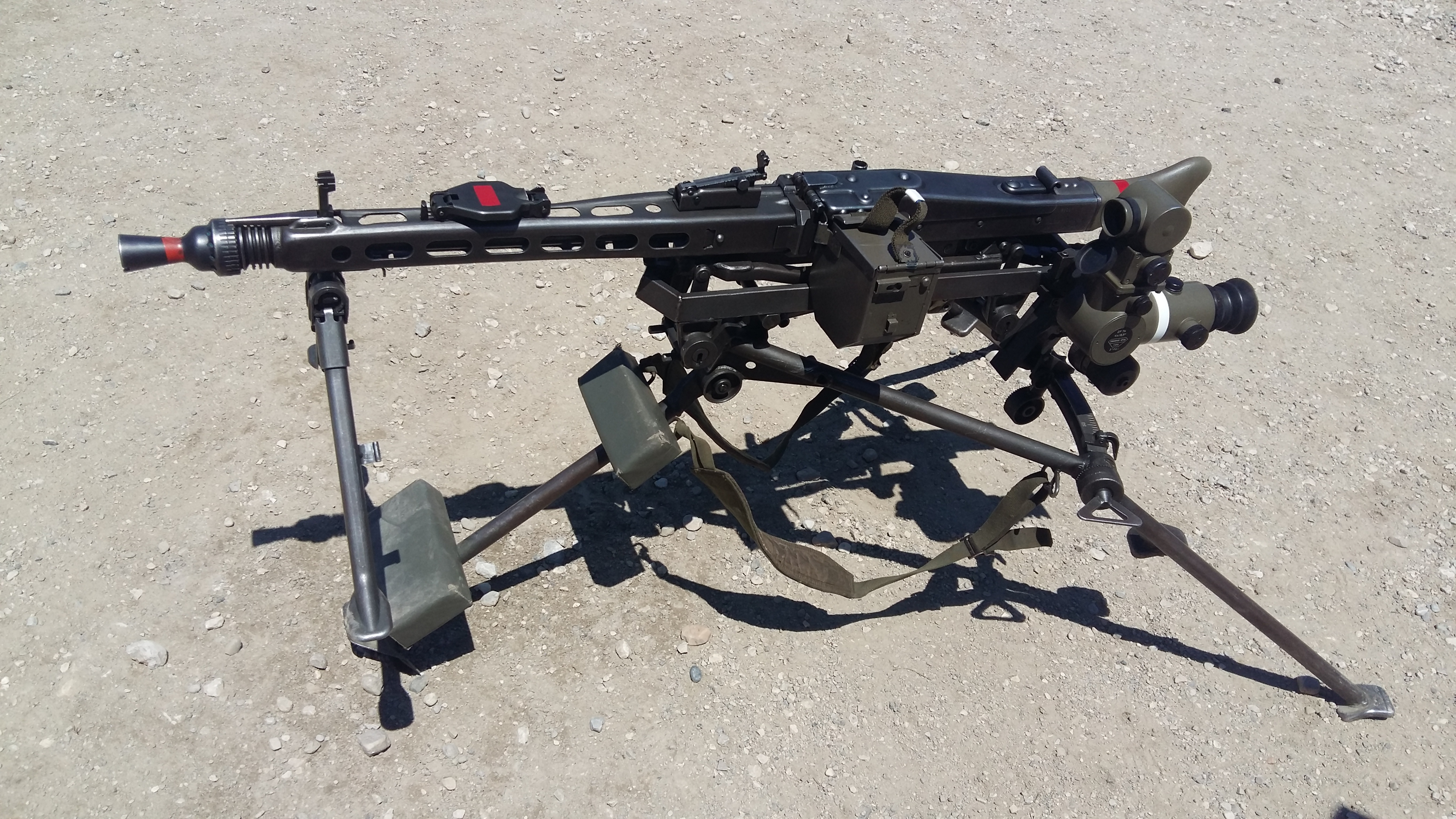
Tripod mounted with 4× optical sight
The MG 74 of the Austrian Federal Army, is a modification of the MG 42

=== SIG MG710 ===
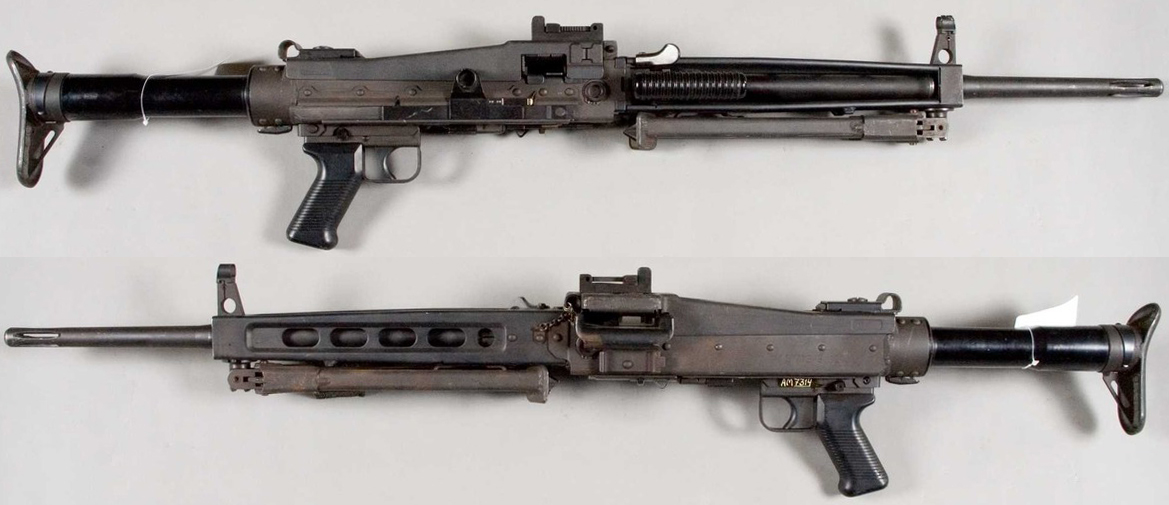
Sig MG 710-3

The Swiss SIG MG 710-3 general-purpose machine gun was based on the design of the MG 45 using a slight modification of the roller-delayed action and chambered for 7.62×51mm NATO. Its cyclic rate of fire is 900 rounds per minute. The first version looks very much like the MG 42.

=== Influence on other designs ===
The MG 42's belt-feed mechanism was copied and used in the design of the M60 machine gun. The trigger mechanism of the FN MAG or MAG-58 is a virtual copy of the MG 42's and its belt-feed is also very similar.

== Users ==
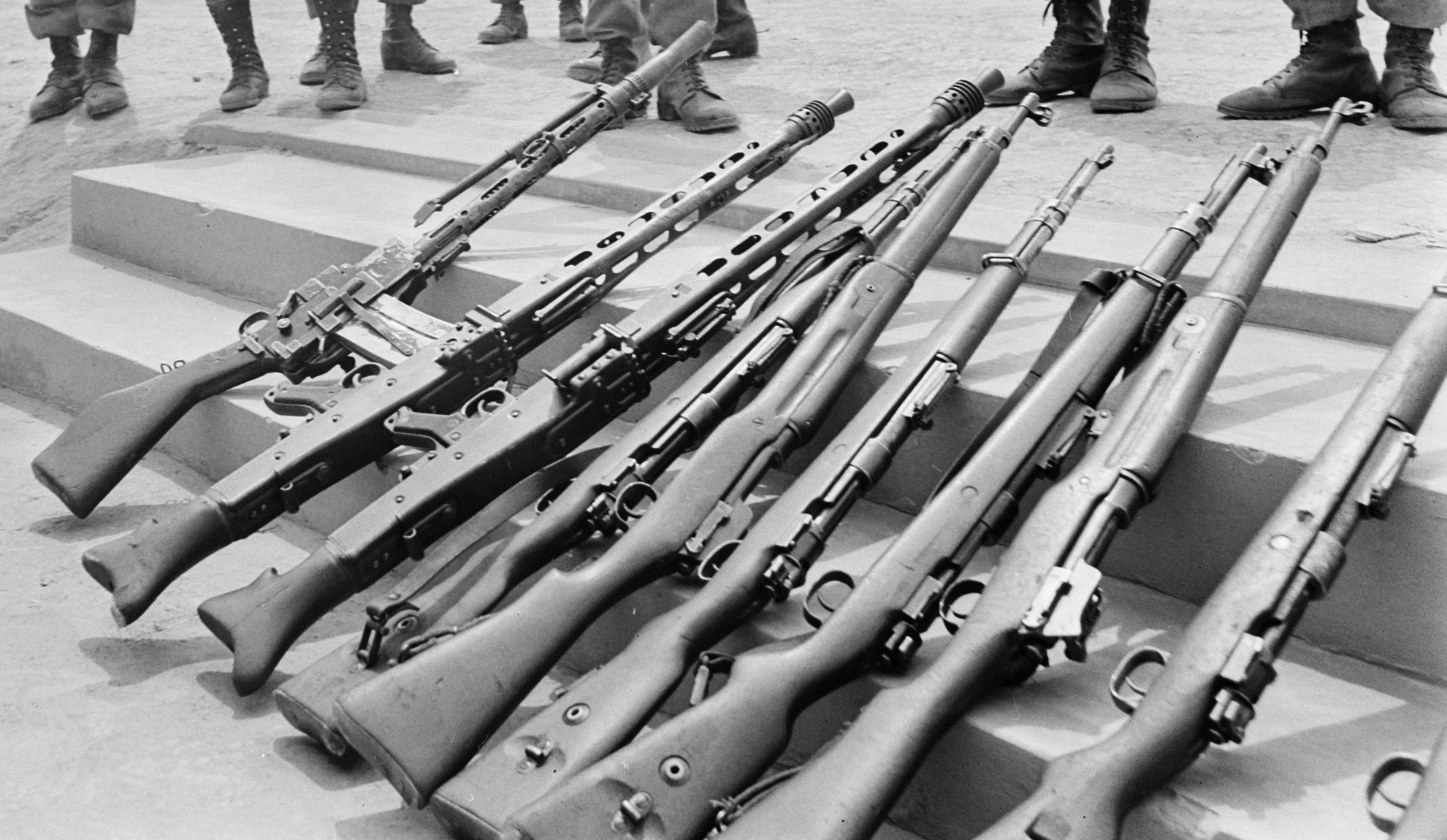
MG 42s (second and third from left) in a training camp of the National Liberation Front of Angola, in Zaire, 1973, along with a Madsen machine gun and several Karabiner 98ks and P1914s.

- Algeria: Used by the National Liberation Front.
- Bangladesh: Used by Mukti Bahini forces during the Bangladesh Liberation War
- Bosnia and Herzegovina: Used the M53 model.
- Bulgaria: Received from Nazi Germany
- China: Supplied from Soviet Union, used by Chinese Militia during the Sino-Vietnamese War.
- Croatia: Used the M53 model.
- East Timor: Ex-Portuguese m/944 used by FALINTIL during East Timorese civil war and Indonesian invasion of East Timor.
- Finland: Used for evaluation only.
- France
- Hungary
- Israel
- Italian Social Republic
- Kingdom of Romania: Received 440 units from Germany in 1943.
- Nazi Germany
- Norway: Used ex-German MG 42's. Two of an intended batch of ten MG 42s were converted in Norway to .30-06 Springfield and designated as MG42F1. The conversion project abruptly ended as most of Norway's stockpile of MG 42s was sold abroad at the same time.
- Portugal: Known as m/944 and was later replaced by the FN Minimi Mk3.
- Spain
- Tunisia: Used during the Bizerte crisis
- United Kingdom: Battlefield capture
- West Germany
- Yugoslavia: Produced as M53.
- Zaire: MG 42 and M53

== See also ==
- CETME Ameli, Spanish GPMG
- FG 42
- ShKAS machine gun, Soviet aircraft ordnance, only Allied machine gun that could fire faster than the MG 42

== Bibliography ==
- Haskew, Michael E. (2012). Small Arms 1914–1945: The Essential Weapons Identification Guide. London: Amber Books. ISBN 978-1-908273-85-7.
- McNab, Chris (2012). MG 34 and MG 42 Machine Guns (PDF). Weapon 21. Osprey Publishing. ISBN 9781780960081. Archived from the original (PDF) on 11 July 2022.
- Willbanks, James H. (2004). Machine Guns: An Illustrated History of Their Impact. Santa Barbara, California: ABC-CLIO. ISBN 978-1-85109-480-6.
