= Werner Gruner =

Firearms designer and engineer

- Born: June 7, 1904; Zschadraß, German Empire (since 2011 a district of Colditz)
- Died: June 29, 1995 (aged 91); Dresden, Germany
- Occupations: engineer (before 1945 small arms, later agricultural machinery), university teacher
- Known for: designing the MG 42

Werner Gruner (1904–1995) was a small-arms designer, mechanical engineer, university teacher and was rector of the Dresden University of Technology from 1958 to 1961.

== Life and work before 1945 ==
Gruner was born on June 7, 1904, in the village Terpitzsch, then belonging to the municipality Zschadraß, which since January 1, 2011 is part of the town Colditz on the banks of the Zwickauer Mulde near its confluence with the Freiberger Mulde to form the Mulde 3.5 km north of the town.

His father taught in a Volksschule and he attended the Realgymnasium in Döbeln. In 1923 Gruner ended his secondary education in Leipzig with the abitur and was enrolled at the Technical University of Dresden in the same year. He studied mechanical engineering from 1923 to 1928 and after graduating (Dr.-Ing.) worked there as a research assistant for another four years till 1932, when he became a technical designer for the Metall- und Lackwarenfabrik Johannes Großfuß (Metal and lacquerware factory Johannes Großfuß) in Döbeln.

On May 1, 1933, he joined the NSDAP. In his role as constructor at Großfuß during the 1930s Gruner is credited with the invention of the well-known MG 42 general-purpose machine gun, the development of which was ordered by the Waffenamt after shortcomings of the MG 34 had been recognized. Named like its predecessor after the year of entry into active service, the MG 42 first supplemented and later replaced the MG 34 in the last years of World War II.

In 1943 Gruner was appointed as lecturer in the field of non-cutting shaping of sheet metal at the Braunschweig University of Technology, an appointment to the RWTH Aachen University in late 1944 was hindered by the advance of the Western Allies. In May 1945 he witnessed the arrival of the Red Army in Döbeln.

== Post-war decades ==
In August 1945 a work commitment was imposed on Gruner by the SMAD and he was later transferred to the Soviet Union as a technical-scientific specialist from 1945 (according to another source 1946) until his return to Dresden in 1950 (according to the other source 1952). Since 1952 he lectured in the field of manufacturing technology for chipless shaping at the TU Dresden, in 1953 he became a full professor of mechanical engineering and in 1969 the head of the Institute of Agricultural Machinery Engineering.

Gruner received emeritus status in 1969, but held lectures at the Dresden University of Technology until 1978. He died in Dresden and his grave is located in the cemetery Waldfriedhof Weißer Hirsch in the eastern borough of Loschwitz above the right bank of the Elbe.

== Awards ==
Gruner received in 1940 and 1944 the War Merit Cross Second Class and the War Merit Cross First Class, respectively, and in 1944 the Dr. Fritz Todt-prize in silver.

In 1959 Gruner received the Patriotic Order of Merit, 1961 the National Prize of the GDR second class and in 1969 the Order of Banner of Labor. In 1972 he obtained the honorary degree Dr. Ing. h.c. from the College of Agriculture Engineering in Rostov-on-Don. In 1979 he was appointed Honorary Senator of the TU Dresden and in the same year received the Dr. h.c. from the Wilhelm Pieck University in Rostock.

== Writings ==
- Versuche über das maschinelle Sägen von Stein mit glattrandigen Stahlbändern und Quarzsand (Experiments on the automatic cutting of stone with smooth-edged steel bands and quartz sand), 1933
- Zehn Jahre Deutsche Demokratische Republik, zehn Jahre Technische Hochschule Dresden: Festansprache (Ten years of German Democratic Republic, ten years Technical University Dresden: commencement address), 1959
- Hochschule und Praxis: Hauptreferat anläßlich der gleichnamigen Tagung (University and practice: the keynote address on the occasion of the homonymous conference), 1960
- Mechanisierung der Landwirtschaft: Maschinen und Geräte zur Bodenbearbeitung (Mechanization of agriculture: machinery and equipment for working the soil), Hochschule für Landwirtschaftliche Produktionsgenossenschaften, 1961
- Maschinen und Geräte zur Bodenbearbeitung (Machinery and equipment for working the soil), 1961
- Probleme der Mess-, Steuerungs-und Regelungstechnik in der Landwirtschaft (Problems of measuring, control and regulation technology in agriculture), 1966
