= Fusil ametrallador Oviedo =

Spanish light machine gun

FAO
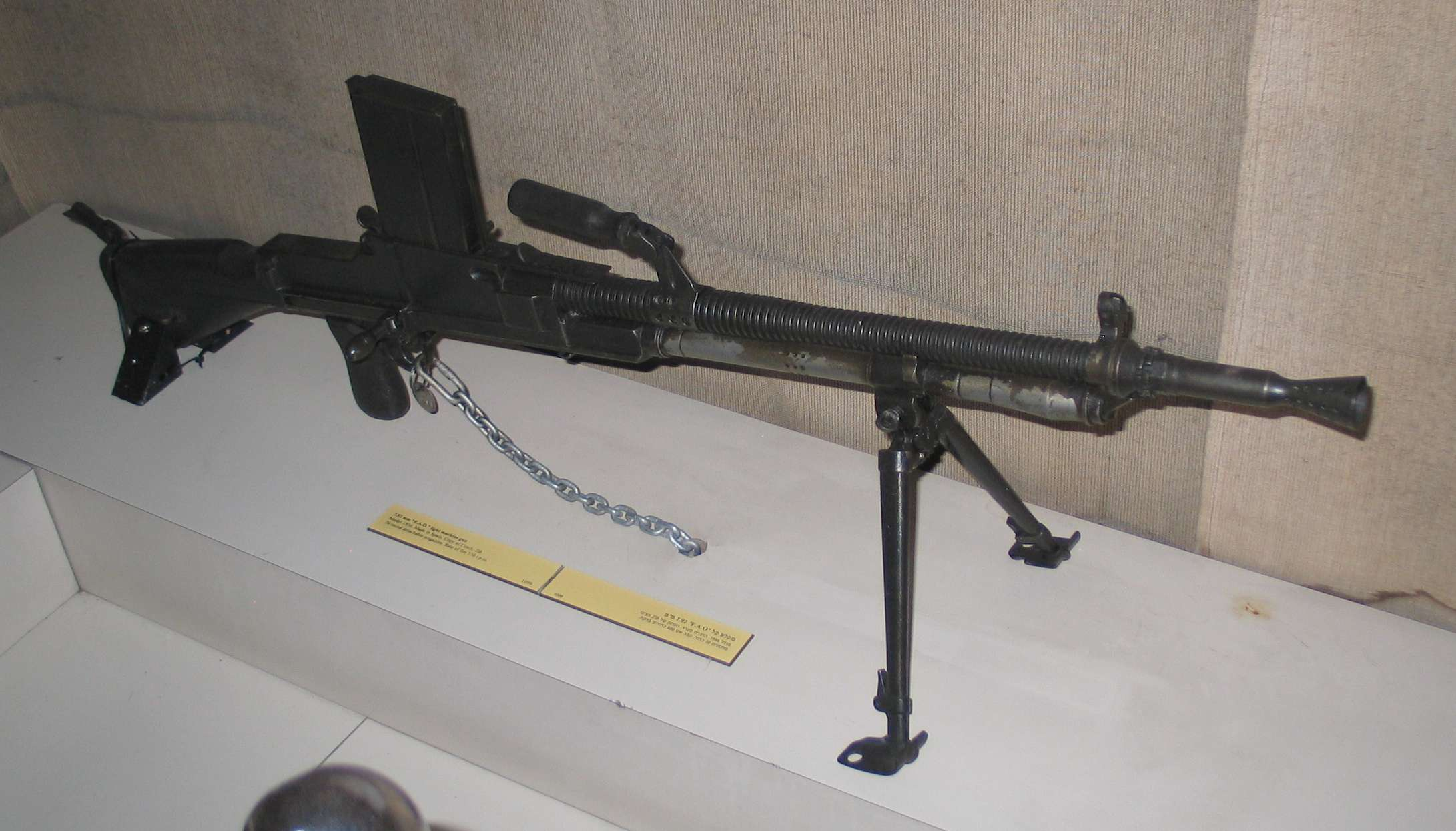
- 7.92mm FAO
- Type: Light machine gun
- Place of origin: Spain

Service history
- Used by: Spain; Egypt
- Wars: Ifni War

Production history
- Designed: 1951
- Produced: 1951–1958
- No. built: 10,508

Specifications
- Mass: 9.10 kg (20.06 lb)
- Length: 1,180 mm (46.5 in)
- Cartridge: 7.92×57mm Mauser; 7.62×51mm NATO
- Action: Gas-operated, tilting breechblock
- Rate of fire: 600-650 rounds/min
- Muzzle velocity: 850 m/s (2,789 ft/s)
- Effective firing range: 1,000 m (1,100 yd)
- Feed system: 20-round detachable box magazine

The Fusil ametrallador Oviedo is a Spanish copy of the ZB vz. 26 and ZB vz. 30 Czechoslovak light machine guns.

== History ==
In 1943, Francoist Spain ordered 7.92×57mm Mauser ZB vz. 30 machine guns from the German-occupied Zbrojovka Brno but received only 100 guns. It was decided to produce a copy in Oviedo. The first prototype was built in 1951 and production began. 10.508 were produced until 1958 and Egypt received 700 of them. Some were modified in 1959 to use a 7.62×51mm NATO 50-round belt loaded in a drum. This modified variant, sometimes used on a tripod, was known as the FAO Model 59.

== Service ==
The FAO was nicknamed Pepito and saw service during the Ifni War against the Moroccan Army of Liberation. It was replaced by the MG 42/59 (MG1).
