= ZB vz. 30 =

ZB-30
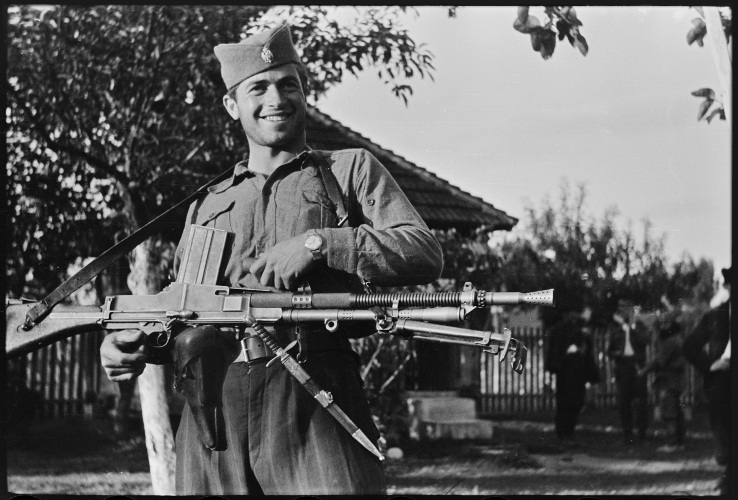
- M37, a Yugoslav variant of the ZB vz. 30
- Type: Light machine gun
- Place of origin: Czechoslovakia; Romania (license); Yugoslavia (license)

Service history
- In service: 1930–2009
- Used by: See Users

Production history
- Designed: 1930
- Manufacturer: Zbrojovka Brno, Cugir Arms Factory, Military Technical Institute Kragujevac

Specifications
- Mass: 9.10 kg (20.06 lb)
- Length: 1,180 mm (46.5 in)
- Cartridge: 7.92×57mm Mauser
- Action: Gas-operated, tilting breechblock
- Rate of fire: 550-650 rounds/min
- Muzzle velocity: 750 m/s (2,461 ft/s)
- Effective firing range: 1,000 m (1,100 yd)
- Feed system: 20-round detachable box magazine
- Sights: Front blade, rear leaf sight

The ZB-30 and ZB-30J were Czechoslovak light machine guns that saw extensive use during World War II.

== History ==
The Zb 30 and Zb 30J were the later versions of the famous Czechoslovak machine gun, the ZB-26. However, the ZB-30 had some design differences, making it similar to the later ZGB-33, which was an early prototype of the Bren gun. Like the ZB-26, the Wehrmacht adopted the ZB-30 after the occupation of Czechoslovakia, renaming it the MG 30(t); it was used in the same role as the MG34, as a light machine gun. In the opening phases of World War II, the ZB-30 in 7.92 mm Mauser caliber was used in large numbers by elements of the German Waffen-SS, who did not initially have full access to standard Wehrmacht supply channels.

Comparison of original ZB vz.26 and modifications:

Machine gun	ZB vz.26	ZB vz.30	ZB vz.30J (Note: The ZB 30J was a late design iteration of the ZB 30 for sale to Yugoslavia (originally spelled with a J) that featured an adjustable gas system so that commonly available light and heavy 7.92mm ball ammunition would cycle the mechanism.)
Caliber (mm)	7.92	7.92	7.92
Length (mm)	1165	1180	1204
Weight (kg)	8.84	9.10	9.58
Magazine (rounds)	20	20	20
Rate (round/min)	500	550-650	500-600
Velocity (m/s)	750	750	750

== Users ==
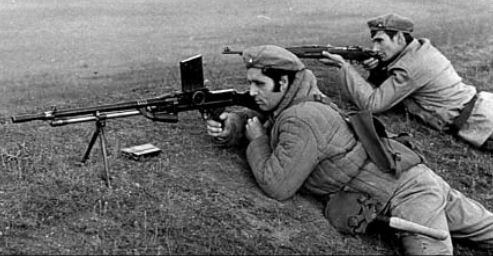
A license-built Romanian ZB-30 used after the war by the Patriotic Guards.

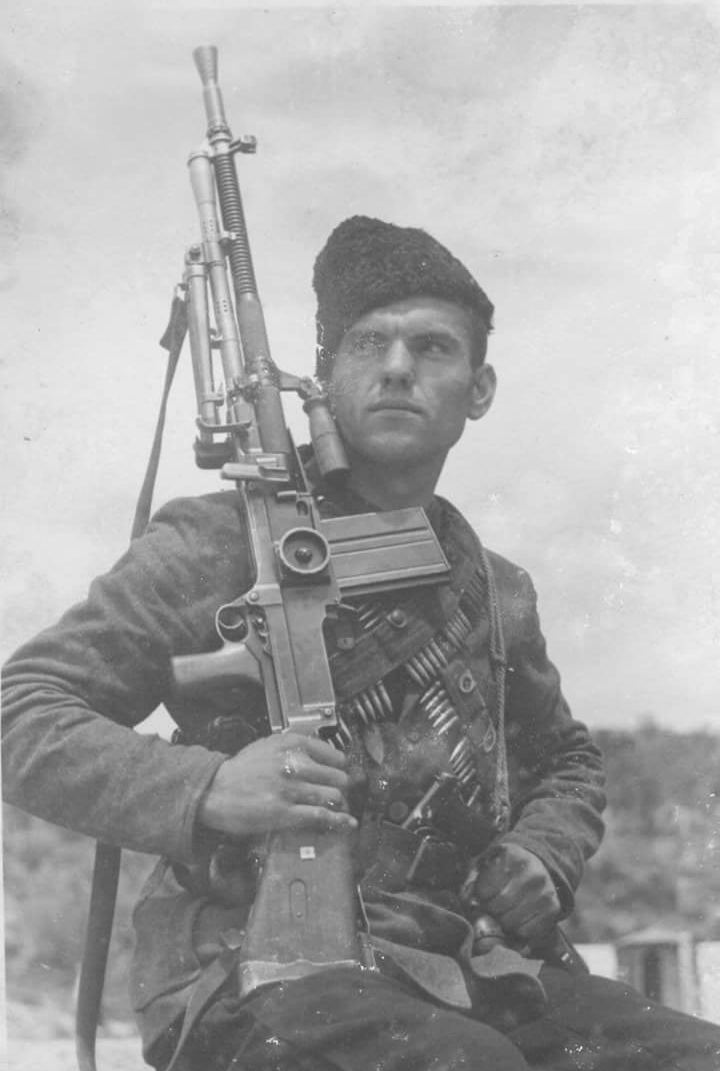
A Chetnik fighter carrying a M37.

- Kingdom of Afghanistan: 2,000 in 7.92mm Mauser caliber shipped in 1938
- Algeria: used by the National Liberation Army.
- Biafra
- Bolivia: 3,350 in 7.65mm Mauser between 1932 and 1937, used in the Chaco War, still in use in the 1960s
- Bulgaria: used as aircraft gun on Kaproni Bulgarski KB-11 Fazan
- Czechoslovakia
- (Taiwan) Republic of China: Imported and produced under license.
- Ecuador 750 7.92mm Mauser in 1935-1936
- Ethiopia: 400-450 in 7.92mm Mauser ZB vz.30 bought in 1934, used by the Kebur Zabagna
- Nazi Germany
- Guatemala: 50 in 7mm Mauser, delivered in 1937
- Iran: produced under license. Modified to fire the .30 cartridge.
- Kingdom of Italy: An unspecified number were captured in Ethiopia and in Yugoslavia. By July 1942, 936 were listed in the Regio Esercito's inventory. Experiments were conducted in converting them to the 8×59mm Rb Breda cartridge. In March 1943, they were issued to territorial units in Lazio, Liguria, and Tuscany.
- Japan: used captured Chinese guns.
- Latvia: 11 in 7.92mm Mauser received in 1936
- Manchukuo
- Nicaragua: 5 in 7mm Mauser supplied in 1937
- Peru: 1,257 in 7.65mm, delivered from 1932 to 1938 Some converted to 7.62 NATO.
- Romania: Produced under license. 17,131 were imported from Czechoslovakia from 1933 and 10,000 were license-produced at Cugir, with a production rate of 250 pieces per month as of October 1942.
- Spain: 20,000 7.92mm Mauser caliber guns ordered but only a few hundred actually delivered. Copied as the Fusil ametrallador Oviedo.
- Turkey: 9,805 7.92mm Mauser caliber supplied in 1935–1939. Produced under license
- Uruguay: 80 in 7mm received in 1937
- Venezuela: 110 in 7mm Mauser caliber ZB-30J received in 1937
- Vietnam: Used by the Việt Minh, supplied by both Nationalist and Communist Chinese
- Yugoslavia: The ZB Model 30J was produced under license as, Пушкомитраљез 7.9mm модел 1937". 15,500 were bought in 1936.

== Conflicts ==
- Chaco War
- Second Italo-Ethiopian War
- Spanish Civil War
- World War II
- First Indochina War
- Algerian War
- Biafran war
- Yugoslav Wars
- War in Afghanistan (2001–2021)
