= Orița M1941 =

Oriṭa
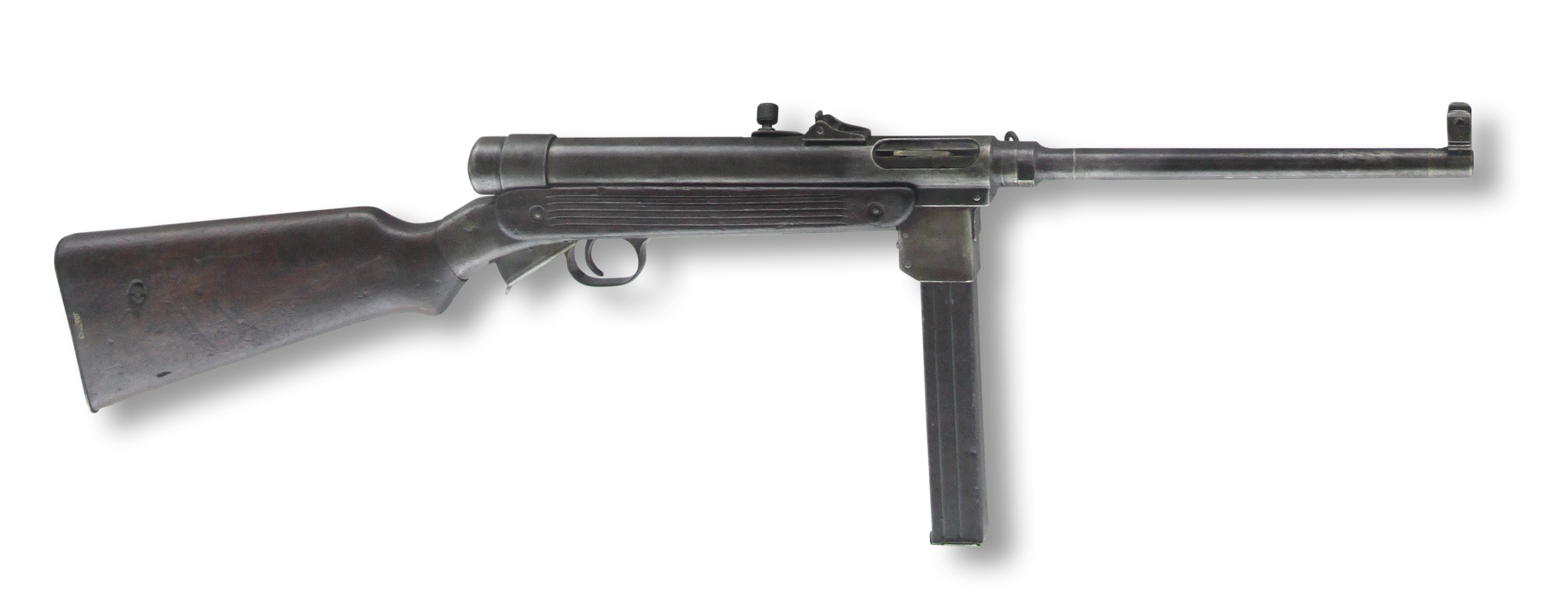
- Oriṭa M1941
- Type: Submachine gun
- Place of origin: Romania

Service history
- In service: 1943–1970s
- Used by: Romania; Nazi Germany; North Vietnam
- Wars: World War II; Vietnam War; Sino-Vietnamese War

Production history
- Designed: 1941
- Manufacturer: Uzinele Metalurgice Copșa Mică și Cugir
- No. built: 6,000+
- Variants: Orița M1941, Orița M1948

Specifications
- Mass: 3.45 kg (7.6 lb) without magazine 4 kg (8.8 lb) with magazine
- Length: 894 mm (35.2 in)
- Barrel length: 278 mm (10.9 in)
- Cartridge: 9×19mm Parabellum
- Rate of fire: 400-600 rpm cyclic
- Muzzle velocity: 400 m/s (1,300 ft/s)
- Effective firing range: 200 m (656.2 ft)
- Feed system: 25 or 32 round detachable box magazine
- Sights: graded from 100 m (328.1 ft) to 500 m (1,640.4 ft)

The Orița is a 9×19mm Parabellum submachine gun that was manufactured in Romania during World War II and for several years afterwards. It was named after Captain Marin Orița (Military Technical Corps, Romanian Army), who is credited in Romania with its design. (Other sources describe the Orița as a joint Czech-Romanian project; the Czech Leopold Jašek and the Romanian Nicolae Sterca are also considered to have contributed to its design).

== Design and production ==
The design of the Orița uses an open bolt firing mechanism which has a floating firing pin and lever system instead of a fixed firing pin. The rifling of the barrel is six-groove right-handed. In 1948, several changes were made to the design: the manual safety was replaced with a grip safety lever, a reinforced metal wrist was added to the stock and the semi-automatic selector was removed with the gun remaining at fully automatic only.

Mass production was made by CMC Uzinele Metalurgice Copșa Mică and Cugir. With a production rate of 666 pieces per month as of October 1942, 6,000 were produced until October 1943.

== Service ==
The first version, Model 1941, entered operational service with the Romanian Army in 1943. Two later improved models were the Model 1948, with a fixed wooden stock, and the rare paratrooper Model 1949, with a folding metal stock. It remained in service with the Romanian Army until it was replaced in the 1960s by the more powerful Pistol Mitralieră model 1963/1965, a Romanian version of the AKM assault rifle. The Orița remained in service with the Patriotic Guards ("Gărzile Patriotice") until the 1970s. A small quantity of these Romanian weapons was also used by the Wehrmacht during the last two years of the Second World War.

During the Vietnam War, the North Vietnamese Army was supplied with Orița submachine guns by Romania. The Vietnamese continued using the Orița in the Sino-Vietnamese war of 1979 as well.

== Orița carbine ==
A carbine version of the Orița was designed, chambered in 9×23mm Steyr. Only one prototype was built; it is preserved in the National Military Museum in Bucharest.

== Users ==
=== Former users ===
- Nazi Germany
- North Vietnam
- Socialist Republic of Romania

== Sources ==
- Anonymous, Román kézifegyverek: Md. 1941 Orita géppisztoly (in Hungarian)
- Axworthy, Mark, Cornel I. Scafeș, and Cristian Crăciunoiu. (1995) Third Axis, Fourth Ally: Romanian Armed Forces in the European War, 1941–1945. London: Arms and Armour ISBN 1-85409-267-7.
- König, Carol. Căpitanul Marin Orița—Inventator român de prestigiu din al doilea sfert al secolului al XX‑lea. Muzeul Militar Central, Studii și materiale de muzeografie și istorie militară, 10 (1977): 229–33. (in Romanian)
- Plăvcan, Liviu; Plăvcan, Dora, Romanian Firepower: 9mm Orita Model 1941 Submachine Gun.
