= MG3 machine gun =

German general-purpose machine gun

Rheinmetall MG3
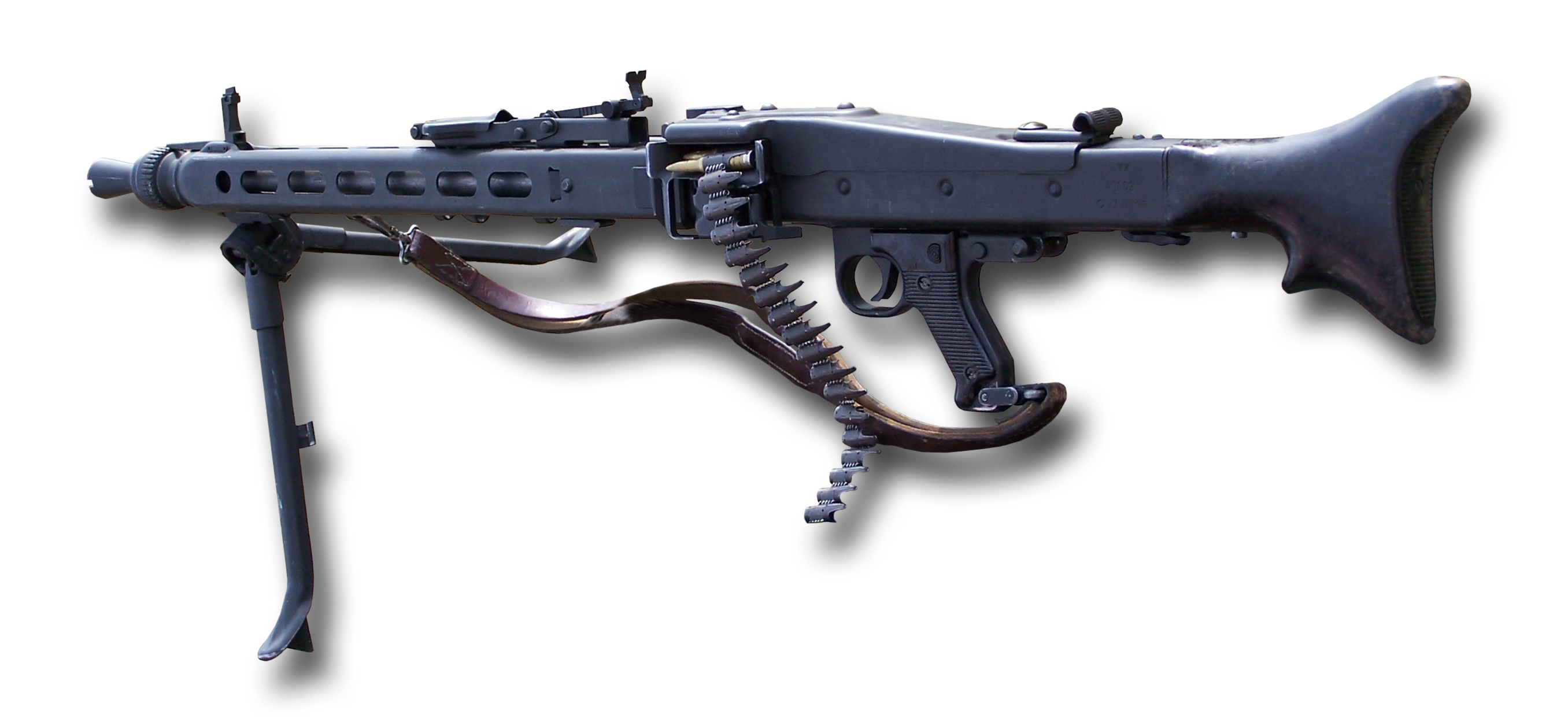
- MG3 7.62×51mm NATO general-purpose machine gun
- Type: General-purpose machine gun
- Place of origin: West Germany

Service history
- In service: 1959–present
- Used by: See Users
- Wars: See Conflicts

Production history
- Designed: 1959
- Manufacturer: Rheinmetall; License-built by: Beretta, MKEK, Ellinika Amyntika Systimata, Defense Industries Organization, Military Industry Corporation, Pakistan Ordnance Factories, General Dynamics Santa Bárbara Sistemas
- Produced: 1959–present
- No. built: 1 million+
- Variants: See Variants

Specifications
- Mass: 11.5 kg (25.35 lb); 27.5 kg (61 lb) (mounted on tripod)
- Length: 1,225 mm (48.2 in); 1,097 mm (43.2 in) (without stock)
- Barrel length: 565 mm (22.2 in)
- Cartridge: 7.62×51mm NATO
- Action: Recoil-operated, roller locked
- Rate of fire: 800–950 rounds/min (heavy-weight bolt); 1,000–1,200 rounds/min (standard-weight bolt)
- Muzzle velocity: 820 m/s (2,690 ft/s)
- Effective firing range: 200–1,200 m sight adjustments
- Maximum firing range: 600 m (1,969 ft) (bipod); 1,200–1,600 m (3,937–5,249 ft) (tripod mounted); 3,000 m (9,843 ft) (gun carriage); 3,750 m (12,303 ft) (terminal)
- Feed system: 50-round non-disintegrating DM1 belt (can be combined in a drum); 100-round disintegrating DM6/M13 belt
- Sights: Open tangent iron sights or optical sights

The Rheinmetall MG3 is a German general-purpose machine gun chambered for the 7.62×51mm NATO cartridge. Manufactured by Rheinmetall for the Bundeswehr, the MG3 is based on the World War II-era MG 42 that fired the 7.92×57mm Mauser round.

The MG3 was standardized in the late 1950s and adopted into service with the newly formed Bundeswehr, where it continues to serve to this day as a squad support weapon and a vehicle-mounted machine gun.

The MG3 and its derivatives have also been acquired by the armed forces of over 40 countries. Production rights to the machine gun were purchased by Italy (MG 42/59), Greece, Iran (as MGA3) Pakistan (as the MG 1A3), Sudan, Spain, and Turkey.

== History ==
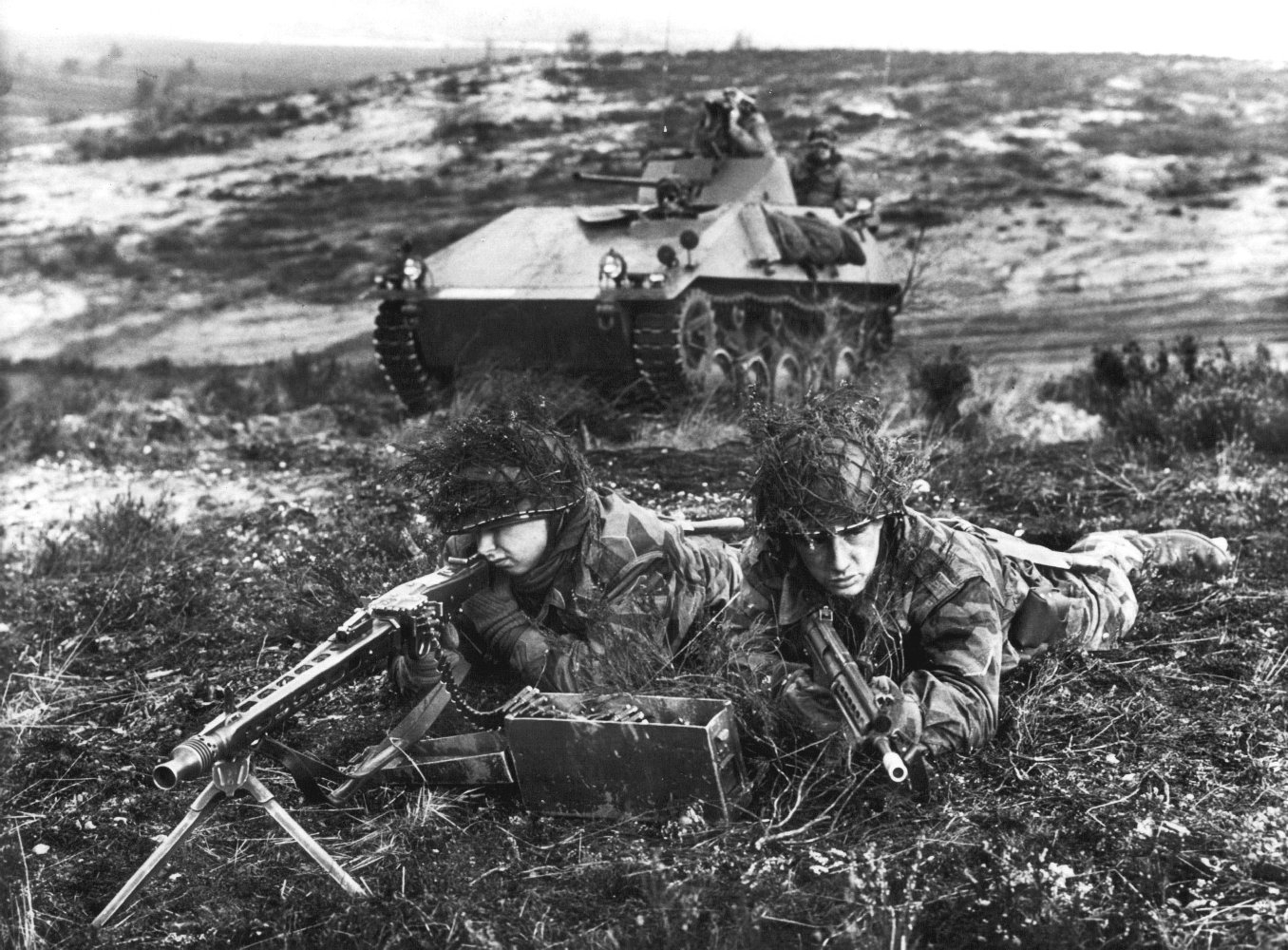
Soldiers of the West German Bundeswehr on exercise in 1960. Pictured is the predecessor to the MG3—the MG 1A3 variant. The soldier on the right is carrying a G3 battle rifle. In the rear stands a SPz 11-2

At the end of World War II, the original technical drawings and data for the 7.92×57mm Mauser–chambered MG 42 were captured by the Soviets. These would later be taken to Czechoslovakia and Yugoslavia. Rheinmetall had to reverse engineer the first postwar machine guns from an original MG 42 machine gun.

Production of the first postwar variant of the MG 42 chambered for 7.62×51mm NATO ammunition (designated the MG 1) was launched in 1958 at the Rheinmetall arms factory as requested by the Bundeswehr. Shortly thereafter, the machine gun was modified, receiving a chrome-lined barrel and sights properly calibrated for the new round; this model would be named the MG 1A1 (also known as the MG 42/58).

The MG 1A2 (also known as the MG 42/59) is a further development of the MG 1A1, which has a heavier bolt (950 g (33.51 oz) for a slower 700–900 rounds per minute cyclic rate of fire, compared to 550 g (19.40 oz)), and a new friction ring buffer made suitable for using the heavier bolt. The MG 1A2 added new bolt-bounce preventing bolt catches to the action to resolve the ammunition ignition timing sensitivity of the preceding variants and was adapted to use both the standard German non-disintegrating Patronengurt DM1 ammunition belt and the American M13 disintegrating belt. The MG 1A3 features further improvements to the muzzle device, bipod and bolt.

Simultaneously, wartime 7.92×57mm Mauser chambered MG 42 machine guns that remained in service were converted to the standard 7.62×51mm NATO chambering and designated MG 2.

In 1968, the MG3 was introduced and entered production. Compared to the MG 1A3, the MG3 features an improved feeding mechanism with a belt retaining pawl to hold the belt up to the gun when the top cover plate is lifted, an added anti-aircraft sight and a new ammunition box. MG3s were produced for Germany and for export customers by Rheinmetall until 1979. The preceding non–MG3 variant machine guns in the Bundeswehr inventory were gradually converted to the MG3 standard. Some additional production of the MG3 in Germany was carried out by Heckler & Koch. The MG3 and its variants all share a high level of parts interchangeability with the original MG 42.

MG3s continue to be produced in Turkey and Pakistan. In 2019 there were plans in Germany to produce several thousand new MG3 receivers to keep using vehicle mounted MG3s in the low level anti-aircraft (designated MG3A0A1) and turret mounted (designated MG3A1A1) roles in the near future.

=== Deployment ===
The MG3 is still used as the standard secondary weapon of most modern German armoured fighting vehicle designs (e.g. Leopard 2, PzH 2000, Marder), as a primary weapon on light/non-armoured vehicles (e.g. LKW 2to, MAN gl-trucks, ATF Dingo) and as an infantry weapon on light bipods as well as different tripods. Since 2015, the German Armed Forces have supplemented the MG3 with the Heckler & Koch MG5.

=== Reliability ===
In 1974, the US Army tested German made MG3s alongside eight other contemporary GPMG designs to replace the then-in-service M219 Tank Machine Gun, which was considered unacceptably unreliable by the US Army. The MG3 had worse results in mean rounds between failure (where it was the third worst entrant), mean rounds between stoppage (where it was the fourth worst entrant), cookoff rate (where it was the worst entrant), and accuracy (where it was the worst entrant) than the M60 and FN MAG. The only categories in which the MG3 outperformed both the M60 and FN MAG were in ease of training, ease of changing barrels, and safety. The MG3 was overall sixth of nine candidates in an unweighted ranking, and it was considered that no reasonable combination of attribute rankings existed in which it would be the winner of the contest.

== Operational use ==
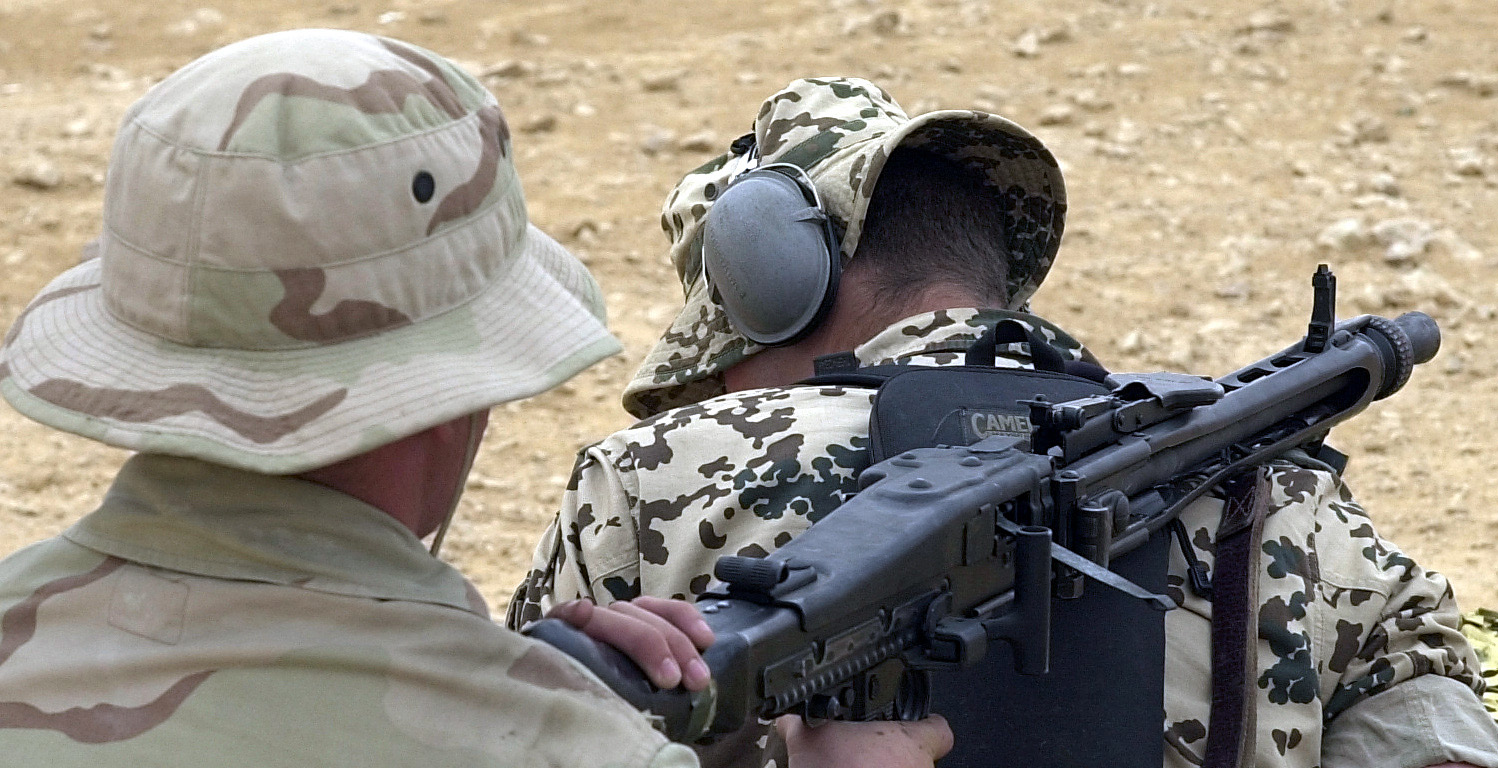
German soldier and U.S. Marine training with an MG3

The German military instructs that sustained fire must be avoided at all costs. In the bipod mounted light machine gun role, MG3 users are trained to fire short bursts of three to five rounds and strive to optimize their aim between bursts fired in succession. In the tripod mounted medium machine gun role, MG3 users are trained to fire both short bursts and longer bursts of 20 to 30 rounds and strive to optimize their aim between successive bursts. The Bundeswehr trains soldiers to replace the barrel of the MG3 after 150 live rounds (or 100 blank rounds) after sustained heavy fire, with a new, cooler one; only once the barrel is hand-warm (able to be held with the bare hand for 30 seconds) can a barrel be reused. Replacing the barrel is a simple procedure on the MG3. Non-observance of this technical limitation renders the barrel prematurely unusable. Care must be taken when replacing the barrel as after extended cyclical fire, the barrel can be dangerously hot, potentially approaching white hot. The machine gun crew member responsible for a hot barrel change is issued protective asbestos gloves or a cloth to prevent burns to the hands. The effective rate of fire is about 250 rounds per minute. Some other machineguns have thermally insulated grips attached to their quick-change barrel, at least going back to the ZB vz. 26 design of 1926.

== Design details ==
The MG3 has an automatic-only trigger mechanism and a cross-bolt safety in the form of a button that is operated by the shooting hand (in its "safe" position the bolt release is disabled). The MG3 fires from an open bolt. The cyclic rate can be altered by installing different bolts and recoil springs. A heavier bolt uses more recoil energy to overcome inertia, thus slowing the action. On MG3 machine guns, two types of bolts are available, with standard weight (about 650 g (22.93 oz)) for the standard 1,000–1,200 rounds per minute cyclic rate of fire and with extra weight (about 900 g (31.75 oz)) for a slower 800–950 rounds per minute cyclic rate of fire. Those bolts also are used along with different return springs.

=== Operating mechanism ===
The MG3 is an automatic, air-cooled, belt-fed short recoil–operated firearm. It features a roller locked bolt mechanism that consists of the bolt head, a pair of rollers, the striker sleeve, bolt body and return spring. The bolt is locked securely by a wedge-shaped striker sleeve, which forces two cylindrical rollers contained in the bolt head outward, and into corresponding recesses in the extension of the breech of the barrel. On firing, both the barrel and barrel extension recoil to the rear. The resulting impact (much like a Newton's cradle) moves the carrier to the rear, withdrawing the wedge and both rollers as they are cammed inward and out of their sockets by fixed cams, unlocking the bolt head. The bolt carrier and bolt then continue to the rear together guided by fixed guides while the barrel and barrel extension return to battery. Upon return of the bolt forward, the impact of the rollers against the camming surfaces on the breech carry the rollers from their seats, and, together with the surfaces on the striker sleeve, force the rollers outward, locking the bolt head into the barrel extension and ensuring a complete lock. The bolt also houses a spring-loaded casing extractor and ejector. Ejection is carried out when the ejector strikes the buffer head, sending a push forward through the ejector bar, which hits the ejector pin. This pin pushes the top of the base of the cartridge, which is still held by the extractor at the base, causing the empty casing to rotate and eject downward through the ejection chute.

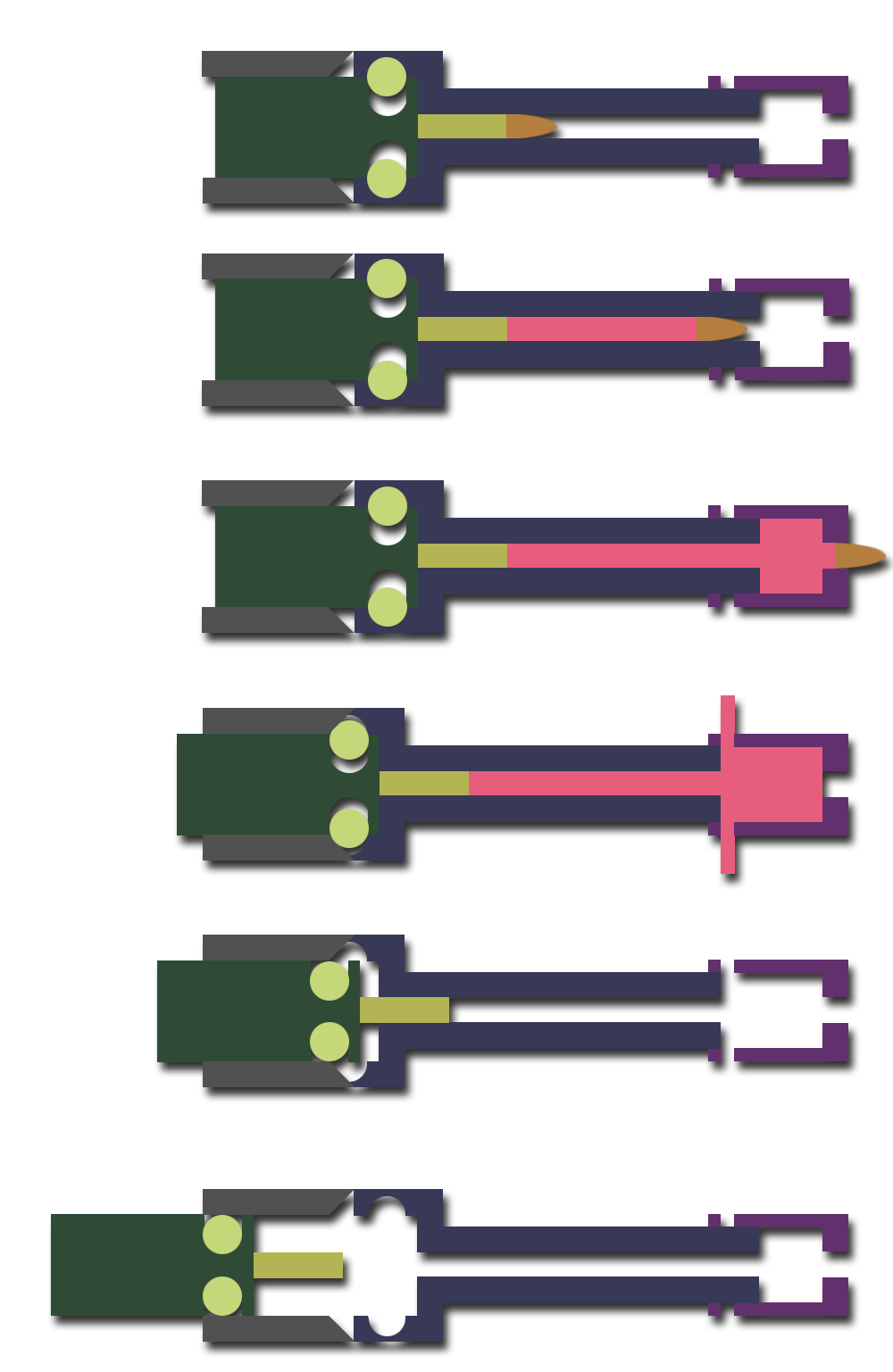
MG3 roller-locked boosted short recoil action diagram

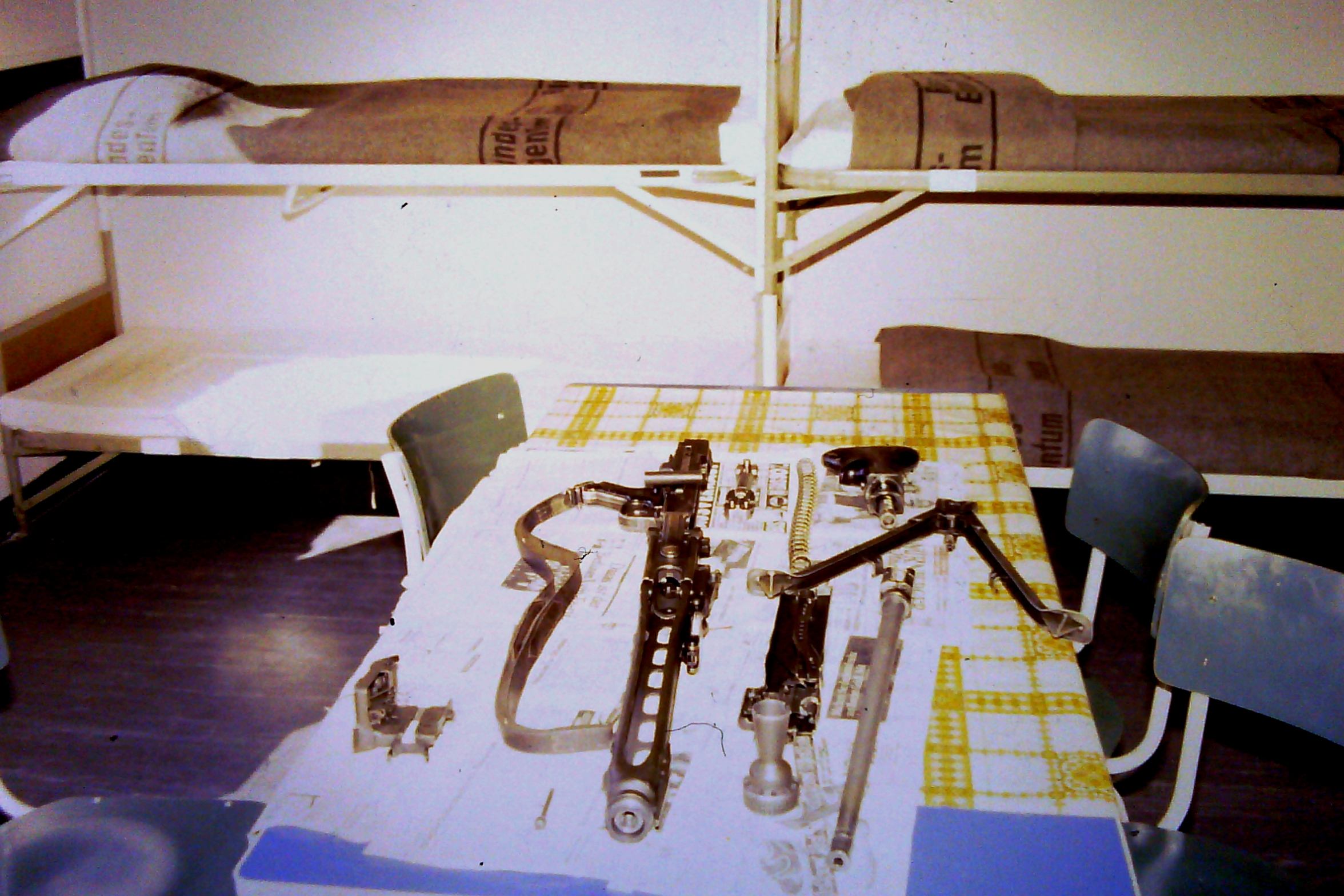
Parts of a German MG3

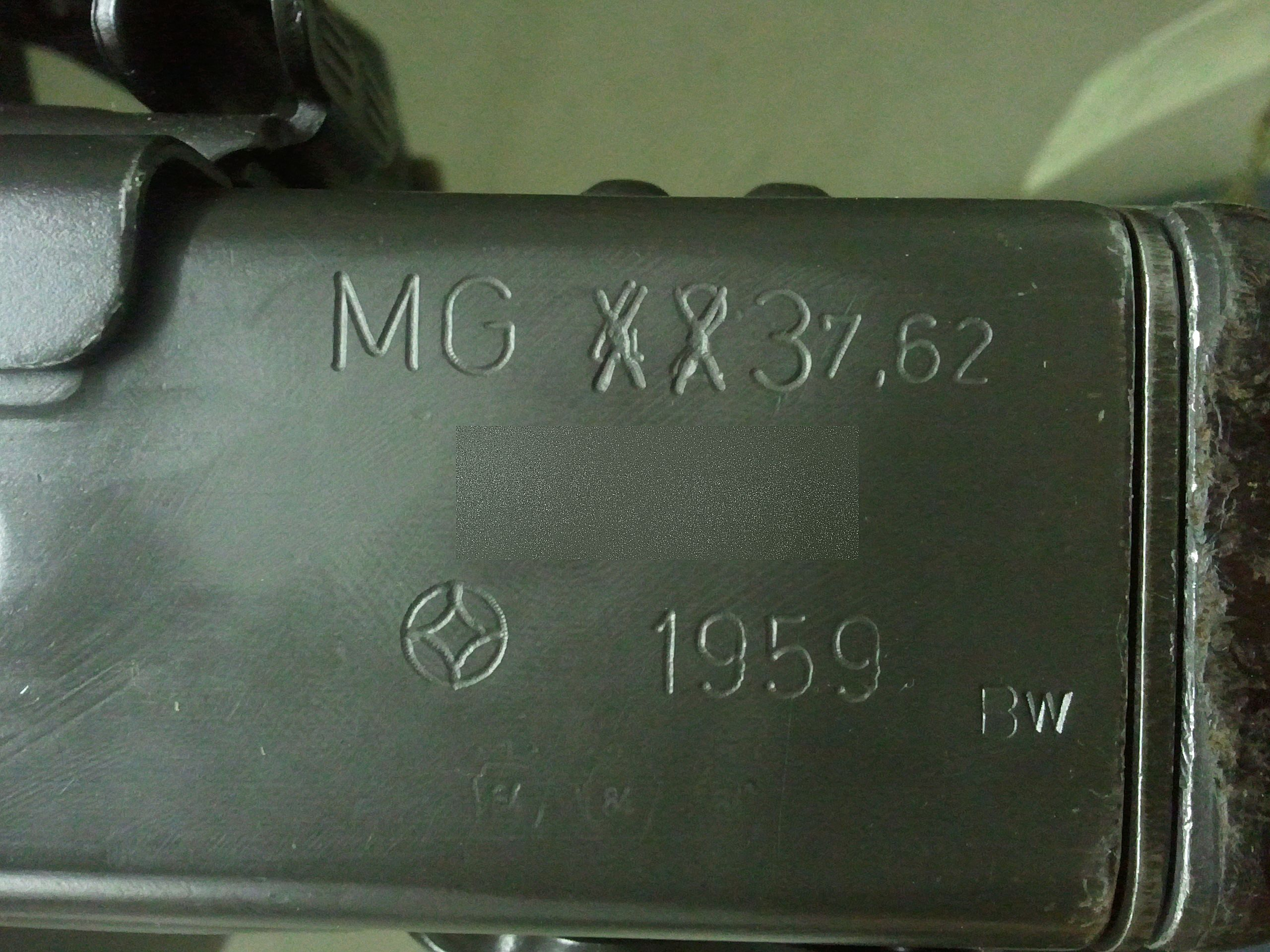
Markings on an original MG 42 retrofitted to a MG3

Schematic of an MG3

=== Barrel ===
The MG3 has a quick-change, chrome-lined barrel with four right-hand grooves and a rifling twist rate of 1 in 305 mm (1:12 in) and weighs 1.7 kg (3.7 lb). Alternatively, MG3 barrels can also have polygonal rifling. The barrel is integrated with the barrel breech. During sustained firing, there is a need for the barrel to be changed and this is how they are swapped: The gun is cocked and the barrel catch on the right of the barrel shroud is swung forward. Then, the breech end of the hot barrel swings out and can be removed by elevating or twisting the gun. A fresh barrel would be inserted through the barrel catch and the muzzle bearing. When the catch is rotated back, the barrel is locked and the machine gun can resume firing. Both the receiver housing and ventilated barrel casing are made from pressed sheet steel. The machine gun crew member responsible for a hot barrel change is issued protective asbestos gloves to prevent getting burned. A muzzle device is mounted at the end of the barrel and it acts as a flash suppressor, muzzle brake and recoil booster.

=== Feeding system ===
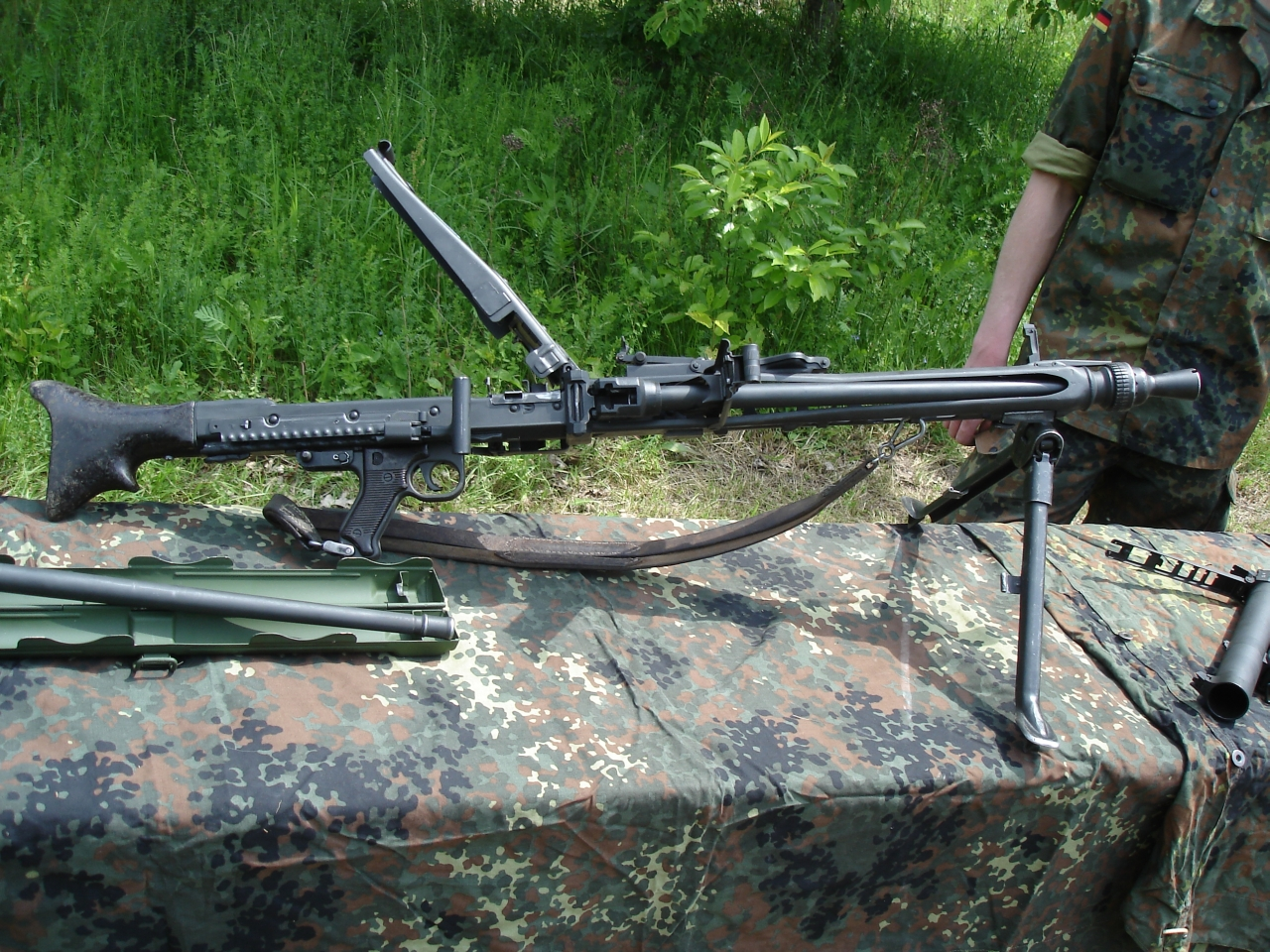
MG3 of the German Army

The MG3 feeds from the left side through a feed block using a metal 50-round drum that uses a non-disintegrating metallic-link DM1 belts (Patronengurt DM1) ammunition belts (which have links that wrap around the cartridge case and are linked by a coiling wire on each side) or disintegrating-link M13 or DM6 belts.

In the light machine gun role, the MG3 is deployed with a 100-round (or 120-round in case of disintegrating belts) belt fitted inside a synthetic ammunition drum developed by Heckler & Koch that is latched on to the left side of the receiver. The rear wall of the drum is transparent and serves as a visual indicator for the amount of ammunition available. The feed system operates through a feed arm that is housed in the feed cover. Two feed pawls are linked to the front end of the arm by an intermediate link and move in opposite directions, moving the belt in two stages as the bolt moves back and forward during firing.

DM1 belts are intended for multiple reuse and in terms of design are based on and derived from the last version of the Gurt 34/41-belt family used in World War II in MG 34 and MG 42 machine guns. DM1 belts are preloaded at ammunition factories in 50-round connectable belt lengths and can be linked to any length necessary. Spent cartridge cases are ejected downwards, and the emptied links are transported to the right.

Alternatively, the MG3 can also be fed by disintegrating metal M13 link belts (designated DM60 by Germany) used by many NATO member states. M13 links are also used on the Dillon M134D Minigun, M60, FN MAG, HK21 and MG5 machine guns among others. The disintegrating metal belt is fed from the left side. Ejection of empty M13 links is to the right side, and spent cartridge cases are ejected downwards. The inexpensive M13 links are considered disposable.

Both belt types are of the push-through type and use a metal lip that is arrested in the rim of the cartridges to correctly position and fix the cartridges in place. The feeding system is based on the direct push-through of the cartridge out of the belt link into the gun's chamber. Feed is performed in two steps by a pawl-type feeding mechanism that continues to move the belt during both the rearward and forward cycles of the reciprocating bolt, producing a smooth belt flow.

For field use, there are several ammunition containers available. The Gurttrommel (belt drum) contains a 50-round DM1 or DM60 belt. The Gurttrommel is not a true magazine but holds a curled 50-round belt preventing it from snagging, twisting and getting stuck during mobile assaults. The steel DM2 ammunition box contains a 250-round DM1 belt and the smaller plastic DM40004 ammunition box contains a 100-round DM1 belt or a 120-round DM60/M13 belt. The German military tends to use non-disintegrating DM1 belts for general use and disintegrating DM60/M13 belts in vehicle or aircraft fixed MG3 mountings that allow for collecting the ejected link pieces for reuse.

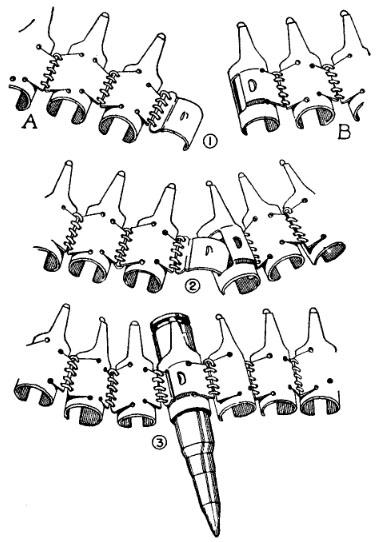
Method of joining German non-disintegrating metallic-link ammunition machine gun belts

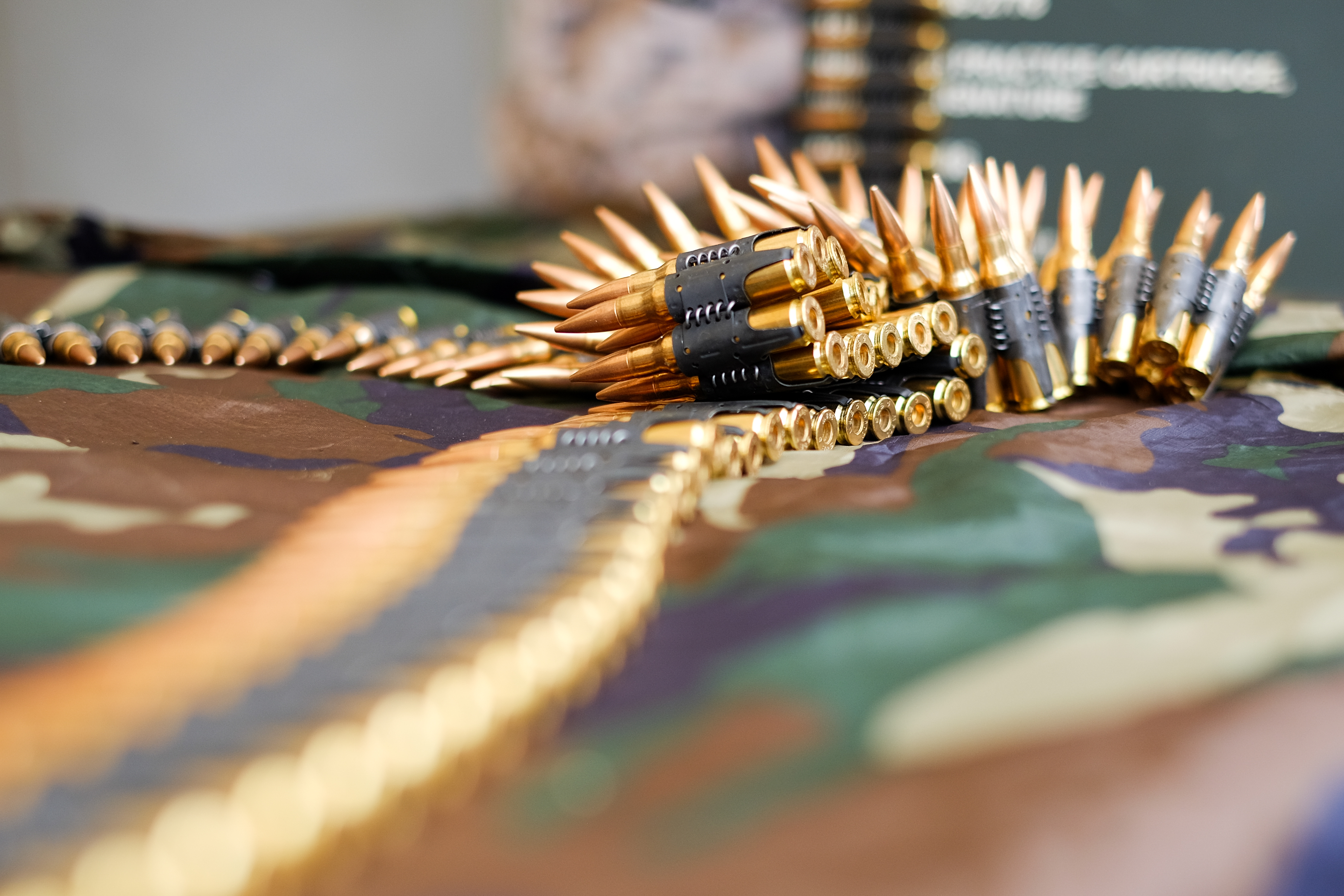
Non-disintegrating metal DM1 belt

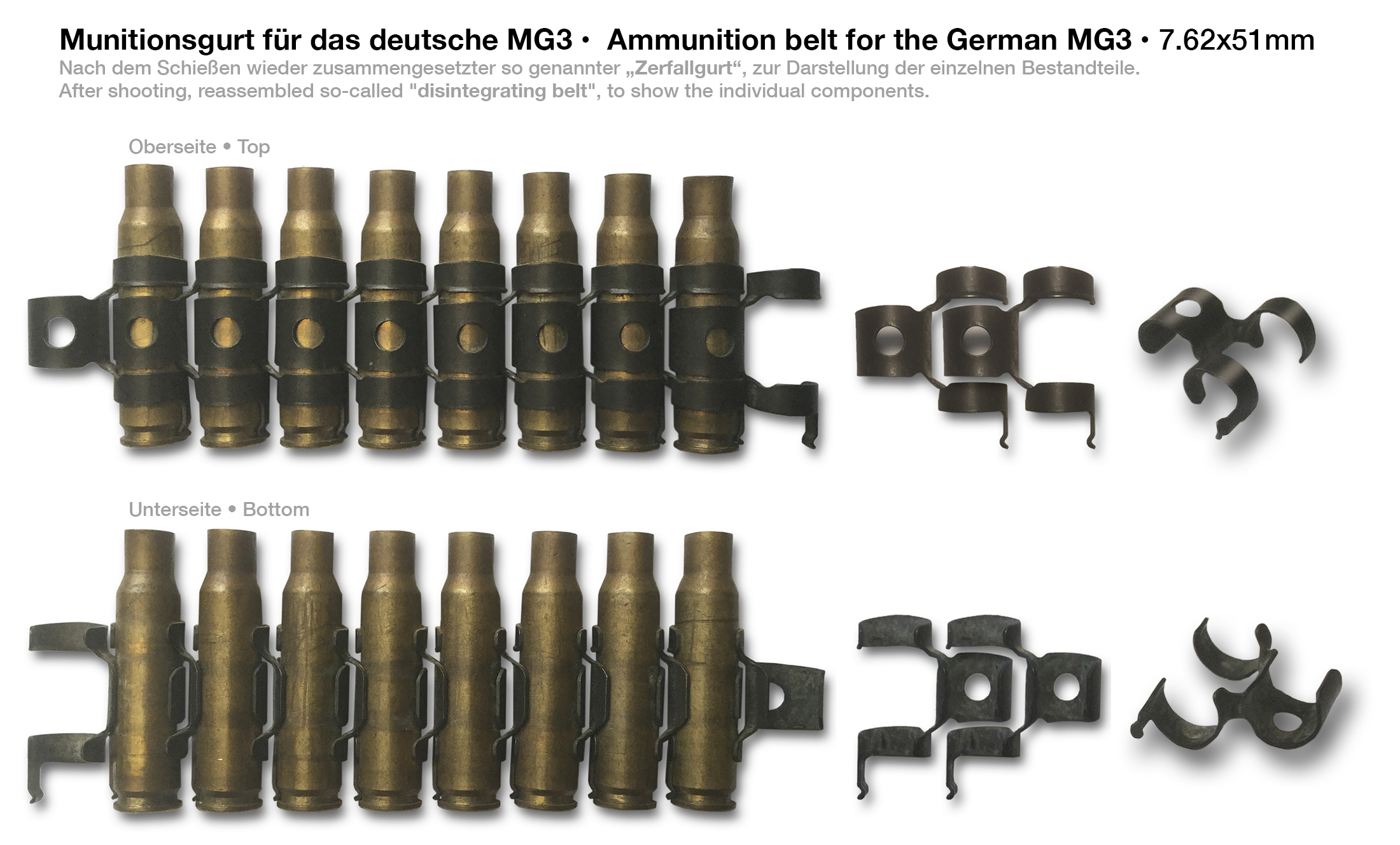
Disintegrating metal M13 link belt (designated DM60 by Germany)

=== Sights ===
The open-type iron sight line has a relatively short 430 millimeters (16.9 in) radius and consists of a "∧-type" height adjustable front sight on a folding post and a leaf rear sight with an open V-notch sliding on a ramp, graduated from 200 to 1,200 meters (219 to 1,312 yd) in 100 meters (109 yd) increments. A flip-up anti-aircraft sight is attached to the receiver top just in front of the normal rear sight element.

==== Danish C79 LMG Optic ====
As an iron sighting line alternative, the Danish military uses a 3.4×28 optical sight mounted on top of the receiver which can be set from 300 to 800 meters (328 to 875 yd) in 100 meters (109 yd) increments on their MG3 (designated as M/62) and later M/60E6. What sets the Danish C79 LMG Optic designated as M/98 apart from the standard C79 optical sight is its unique reticle of a chevron with a height of 12,5 TS and two TS line left and right with a length of 7,5 TS beginning 2,5 TS away from the tip of the chevron. The sight designated as M/99 is also available in a night vision configuration.

=== Bipod and tripod ===
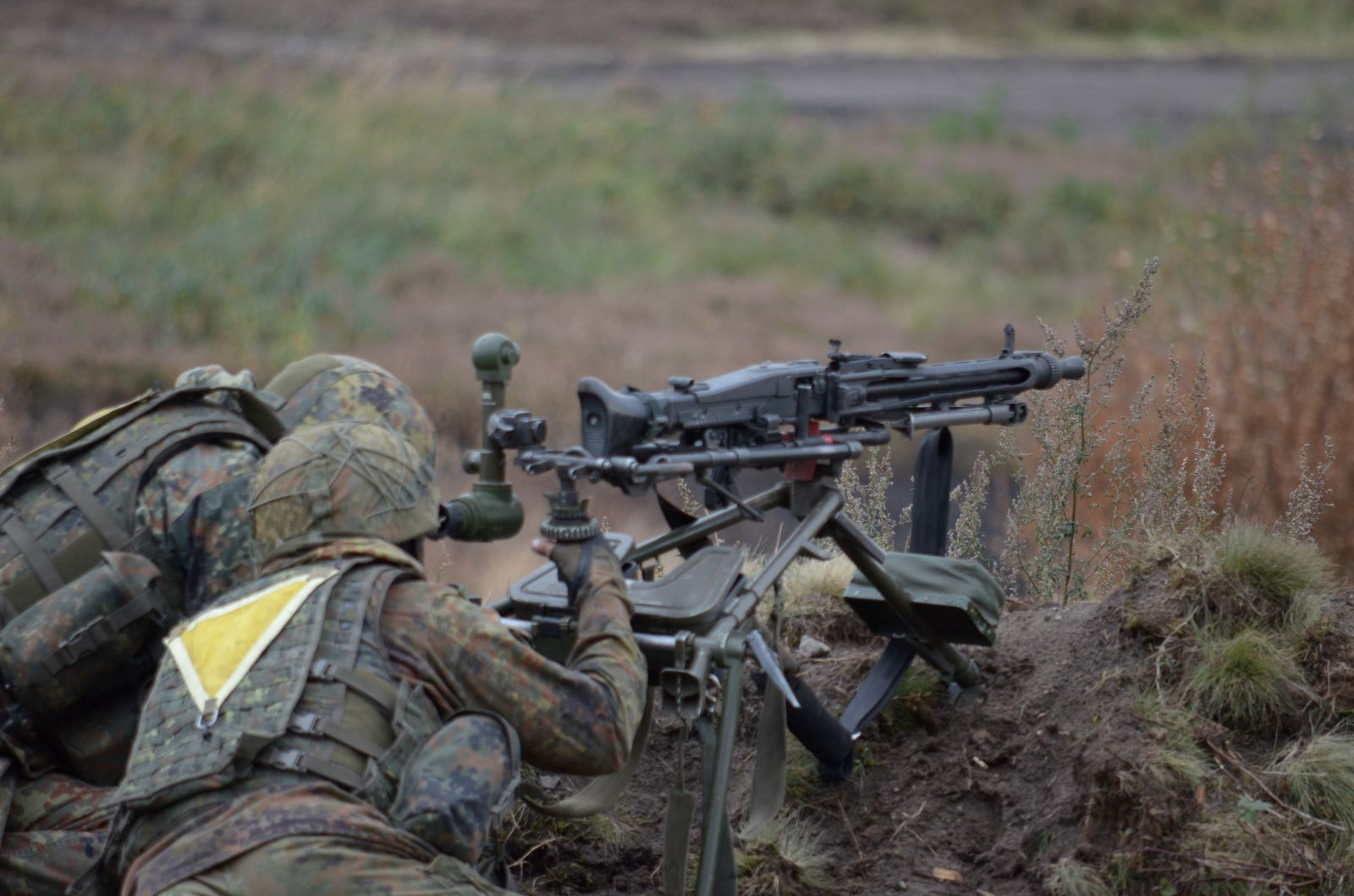
MG3 seen here in the stationary, heavy machine gun role, mounted on a stabilized Feldlafette tripod and fitted with an optical Zielfernrohr 4 × 24 periscope sight

For the light machine gun role, the MG3 is equipped with a synthetic polymer stock and a folding bipod.

In the stationary, heavy machine gun role, the MG3 is mounted on a buffered Feldlafette ("field tripod") that also features storage containers for accessories like the Zielfernrohr 4 × 24 periscope-style telescopic sight. This direct fire sight is also mounted on the Feldlafette and is graduated from 0 to 1,600 meters (0 to 1,750 yd) in 100 meters (109 yd) increments. The Zielfernrohr 4 × 24 reticle can be illuminated by an external unit. It can also be used with the FERO-Z 51 night sight.

A feature of the German World War II Lafette 42 tripod that was not carried over to the MG3 Feldlafette was the Tiefenfeuerautomat ("in-depth automatic fire"). If selected, this feature walked the fire in wave like motions up and down the range between predefined ranges. This sweeping of a given range (Tiefenfeuer – "in-depth fire") continued as long as the gun was fired.

== Variants ==
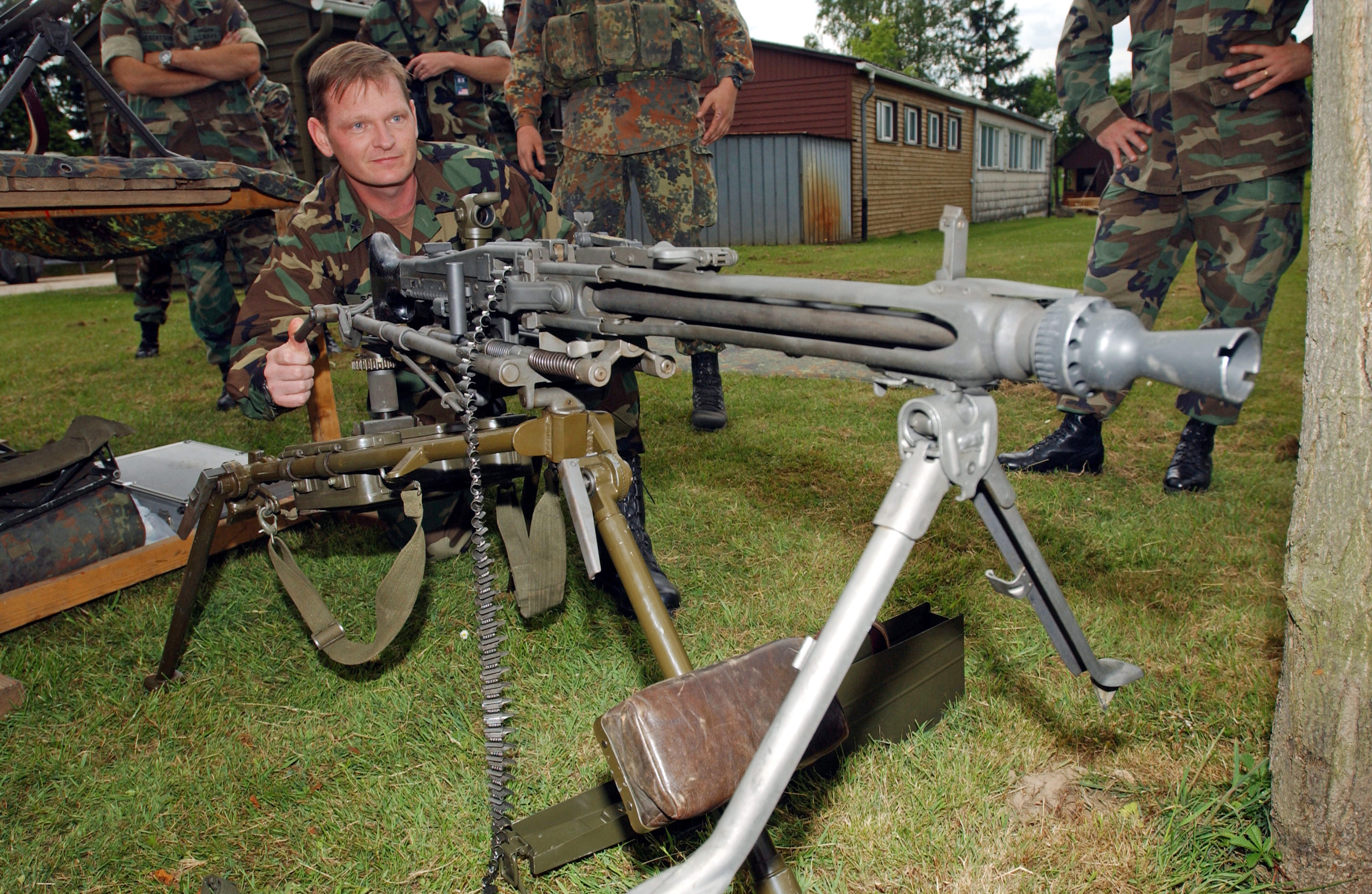
MG3 in the heavy machine gun setup on a Feldlafette tripod with mounted optical sight

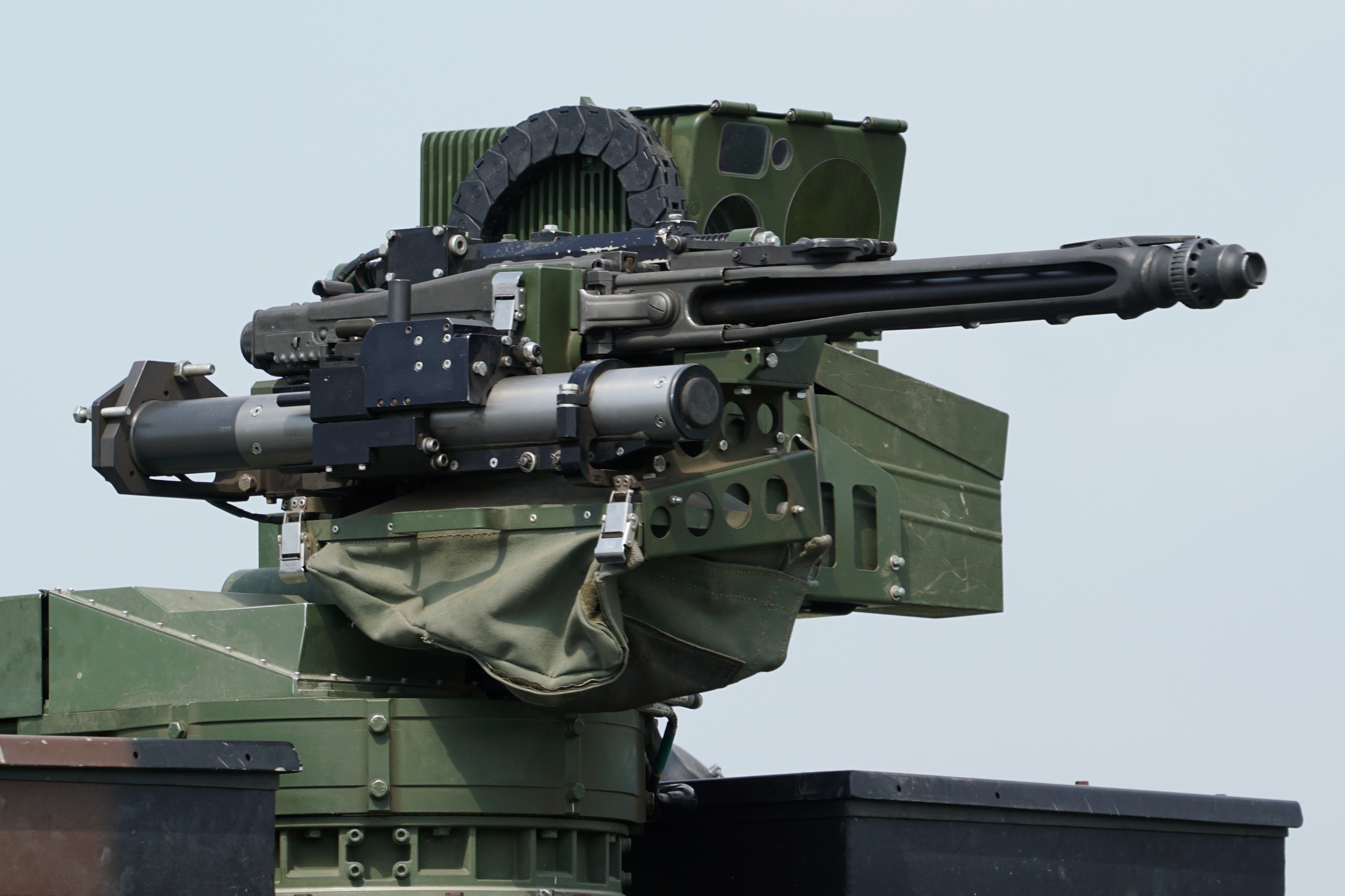
Vehicle-mounted MG3 at the Bundeswehr Day in 2019

- MG 1: Rheinmetall variant of the MG 42, most notably rechambered to fire 7.62×51mm NATO.
- MG 1A1 (MG 42/58): As MG 1, but with sights properly calibrated for the new round. Sights refitted to existing MG 1s.
- MG 1A2 (MG 42/59): MG 1A1 variant; product improved with longer ejection port, heavy bolt and friction ring buffer.
- MG 1A3: MG 1A2 variant; product improvement of all major components.
- MG 1A4: MG 1 variant; for fixed mount armour use.
- MG 1A5: MG 1A3 variant; MG1A3s converted to MG1A4 standard.
- MG 2: Designation for all wartime MG 42s rechambered to 7.62×51mm NATO.
- MG3: MG 1A3 variant; product improved with AA rear sight.
- MG3E: MG3 variant; reduced weight model (roughly 1.3 kg lighter), entered into late 1970s NATO small arms trials.
- MG3A1: MG3 variant; for fixed mount armour use.
- MG3KWS: MG3 variant; developed by Rheinmetall and Tactics Group as a stand in until the HK121 replaces it.
- MG 42/59: Italian variant produced by Beretta, Whitehead Motofides and Franchi, since 1959, Chambered in 7.62×51mm NATO. The bolt weight was increased to 1,200 g (42.33 oz)) for a reduced 800 rounds per minute cyclic rate of fire. Used mainly mounted on vehicles and has largely been phased out by the FN Minimi.
- Ksp m/94: Swedish variant chambered with the 7.62×51mm NATO round. Mainly used as secondary armament in Stridsvagn 122.

== Derivatives ==
The Rheinmetall RMG 7.62 is a mounted machine gun based from the Rheinmetall MG3 with three rotating barrels (to reduce barrel erosion and overheating) is under development as a vehicle weapon. Only one barrel is active at a time: after one barrel overheats, it is rotated out for a cool one.

The MG14z is a double barrel derivative of the Rheinmetall MG3 with two MG3 receivers paired together. The MG14z enhances the firepower of military units that still issue the MG3 or other MG 42 derivatives. It has been developed by the Tactics Group GmbH company as "a low-cost alternative to Miniguns".

== Users ==
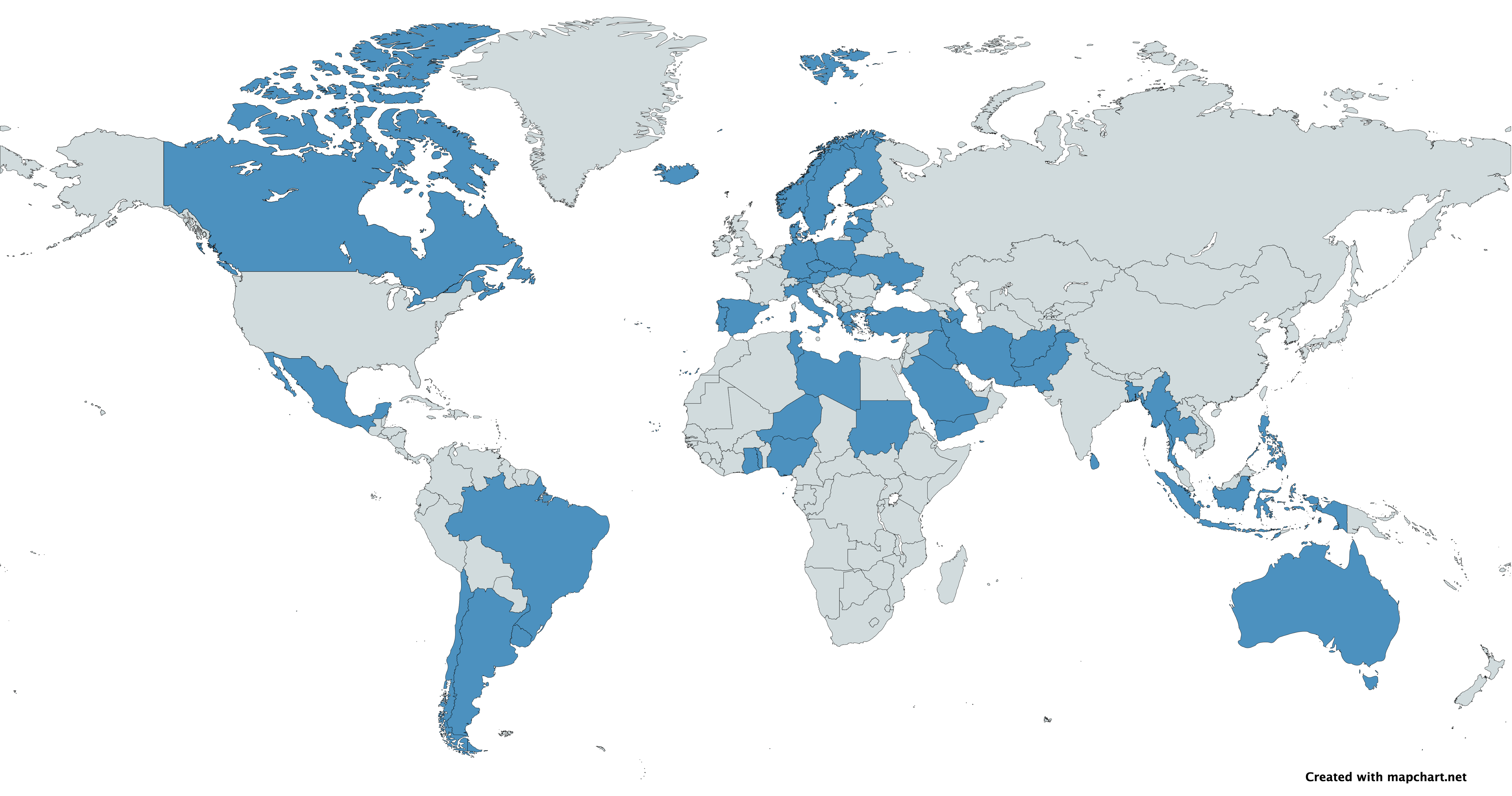
Map with MG3 users in blue

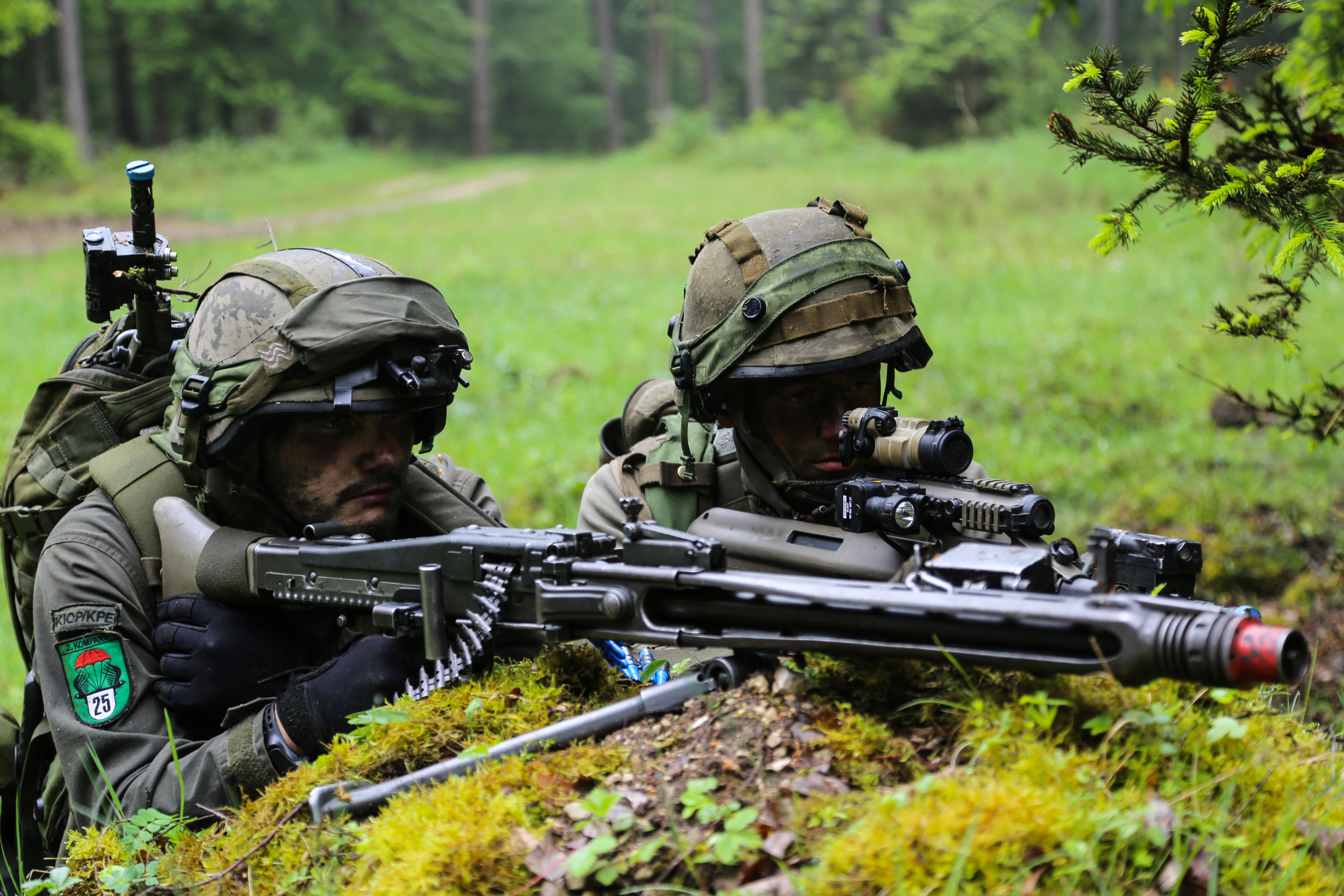
Austrian Army soldiers with an MG 74 and a Steyr AUG during the 2014 Combined Resolve II training exercise

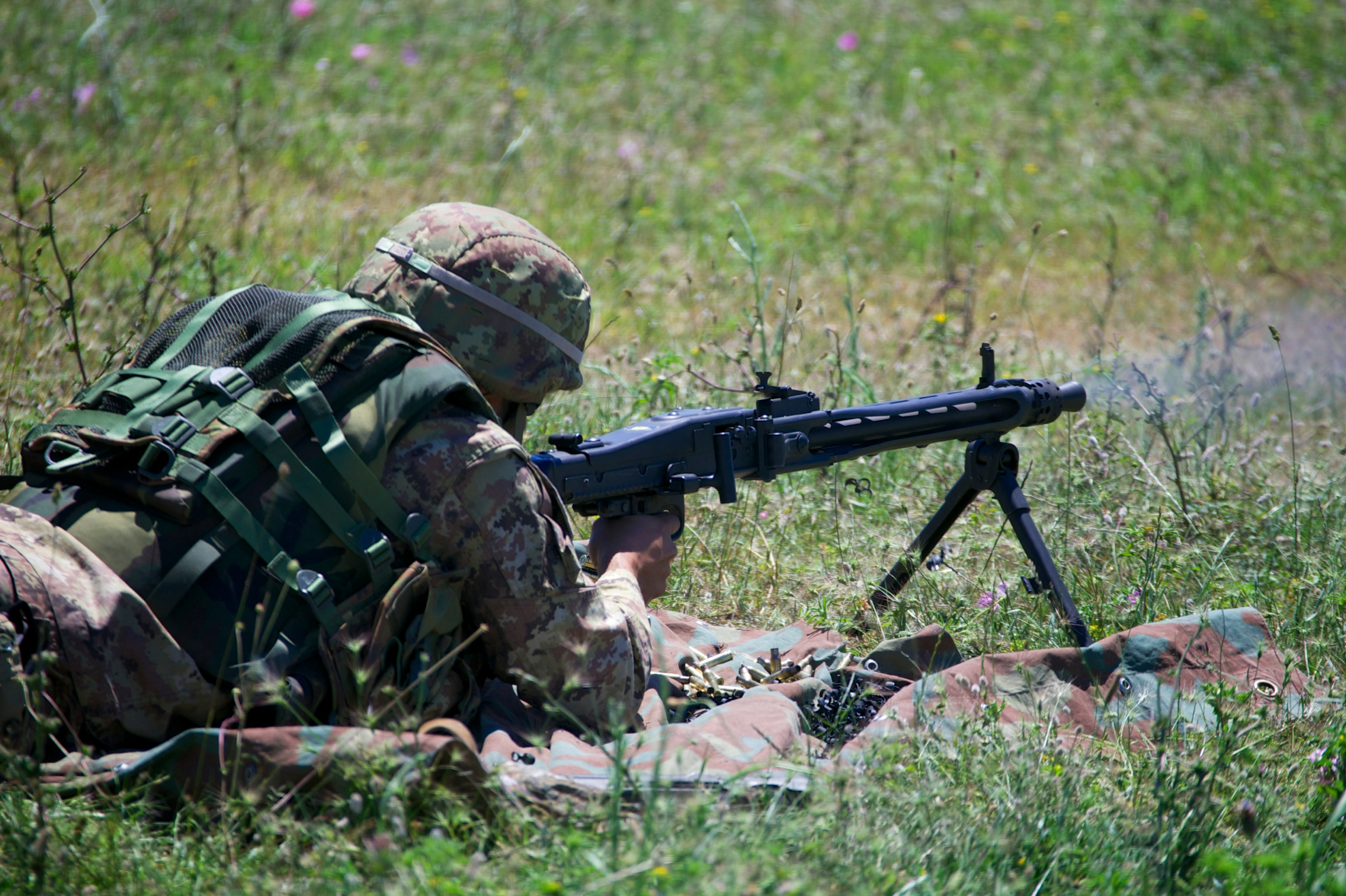
Italian soldier with an MG-42/59 produced by Beretta

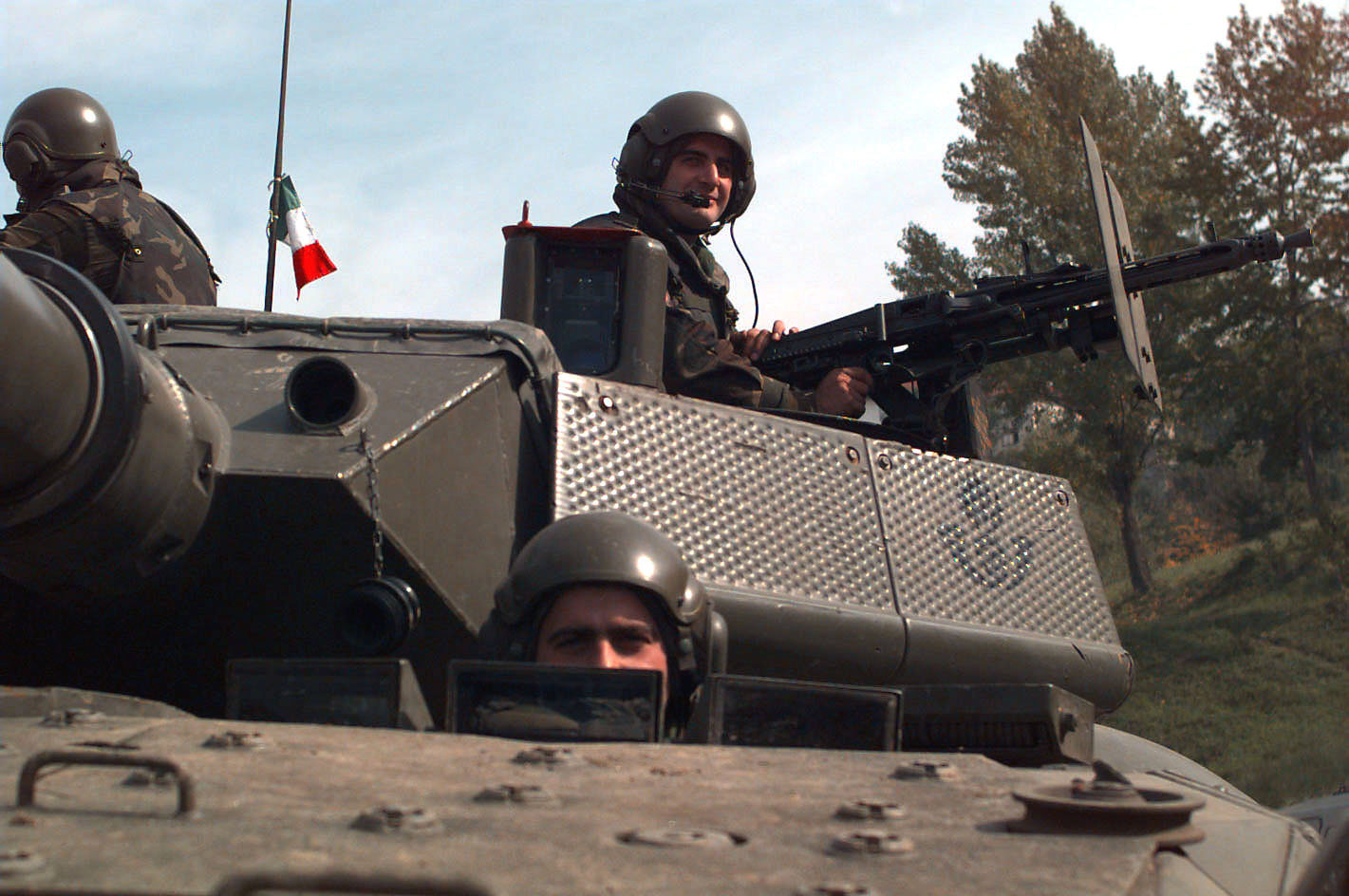
Italy employs the MG 42/59 primarily on vehicles and rotary-wing aircraft. Seen here mounted on the B1 Centauro wheeled tank destroyer

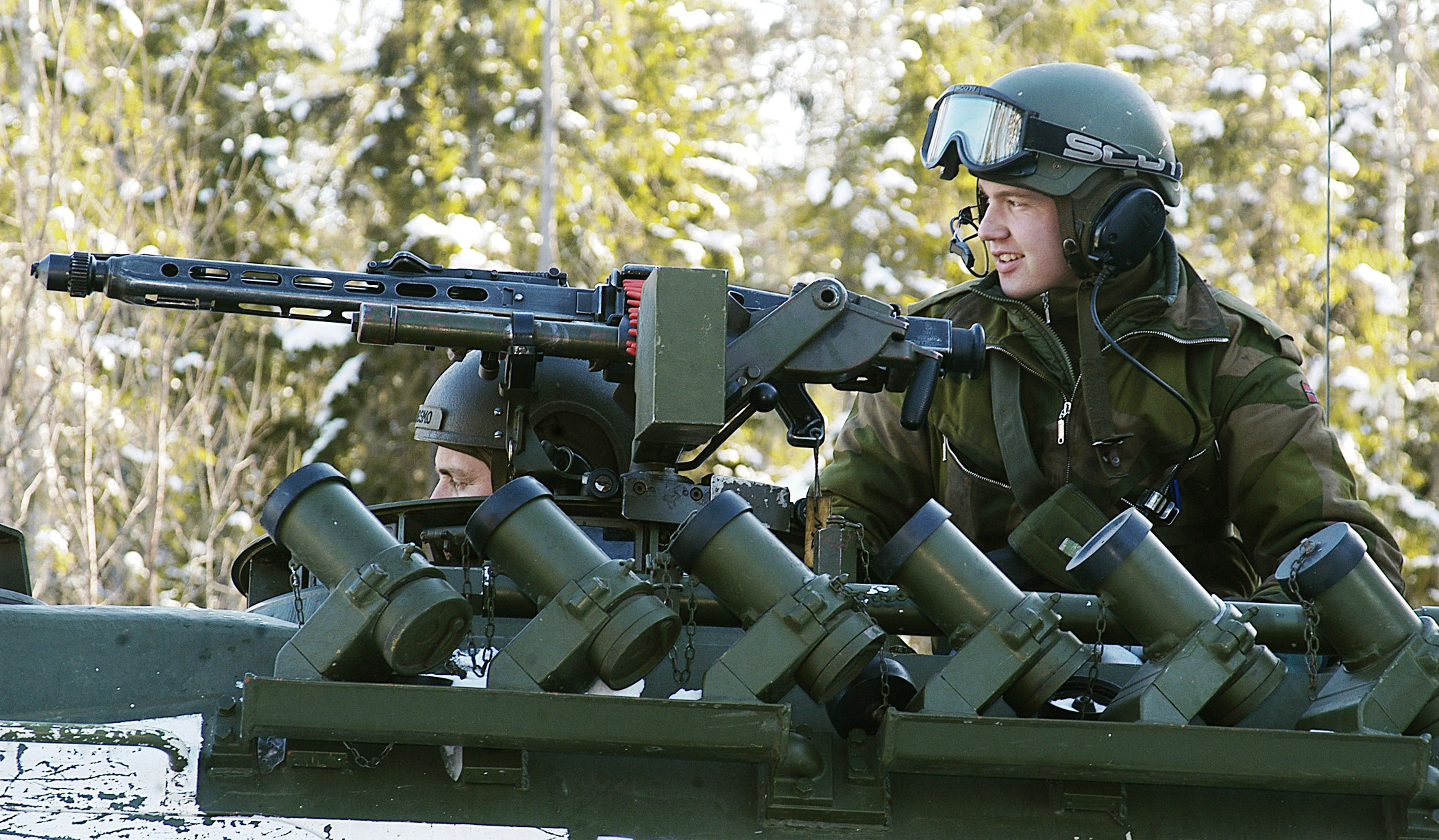
A pintle-mounted MG3A1 on a Norwegian Leopard 1 armoured recovery vehicle

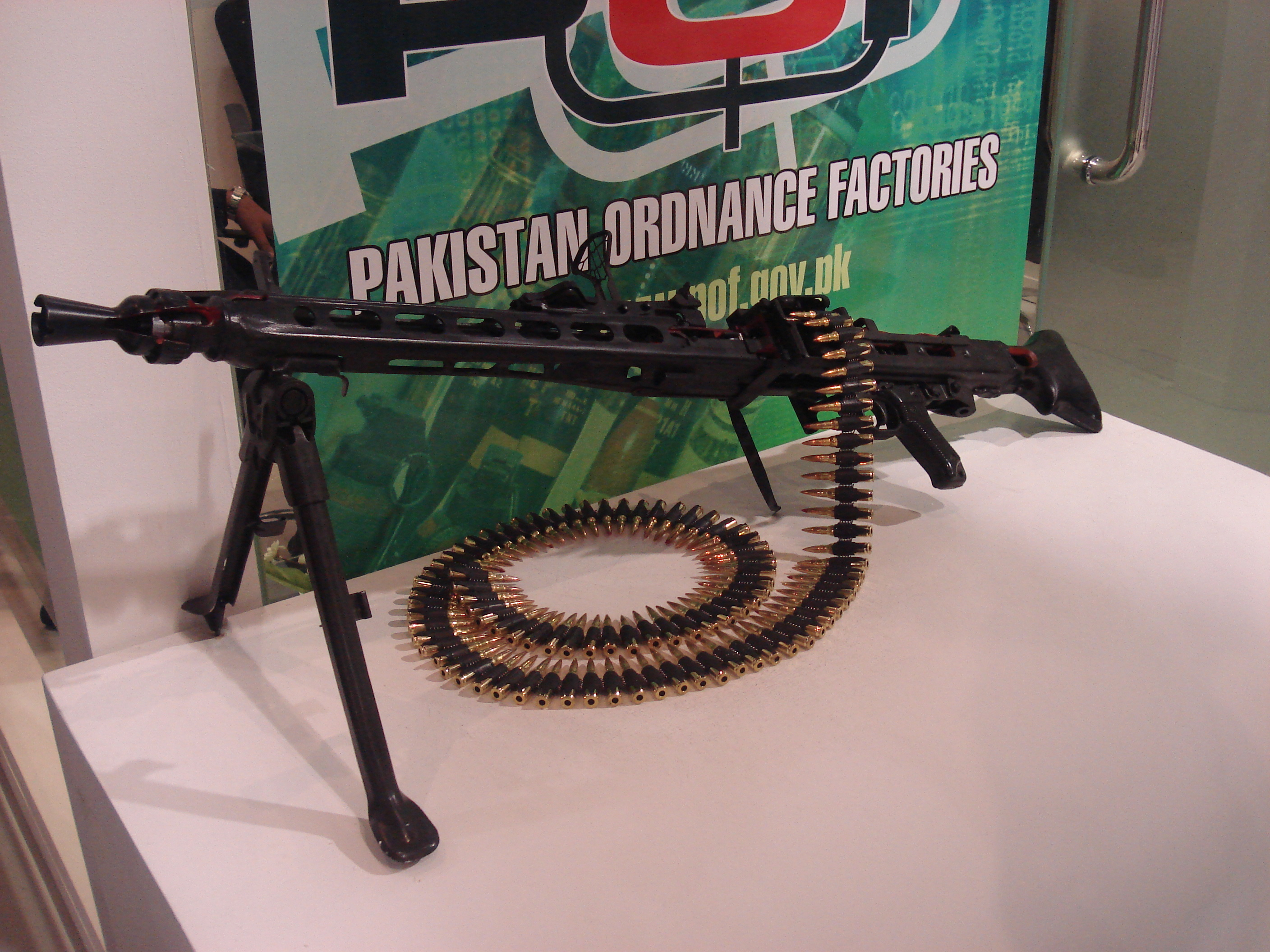
MG3 manufactured under license by Pakistan Ordnance Factories

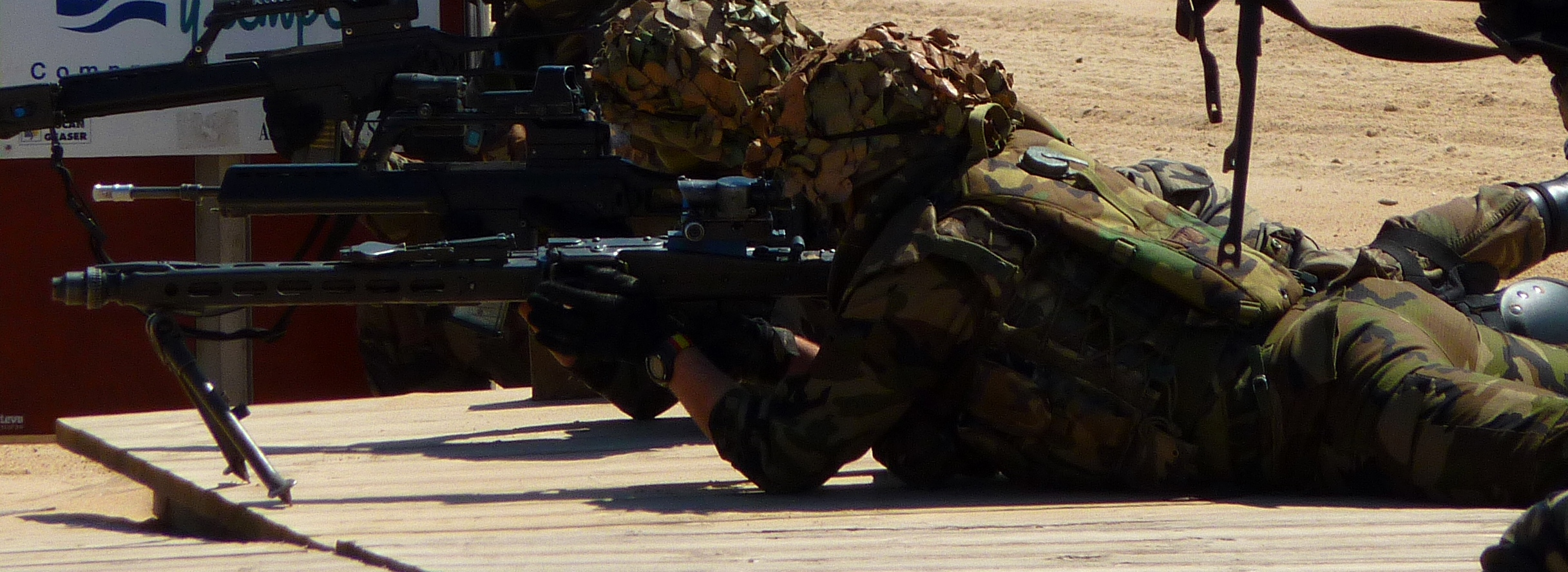
Spanish Marines with an MG3 manufactured by General Dynamics Santa Bárbara Sistemas

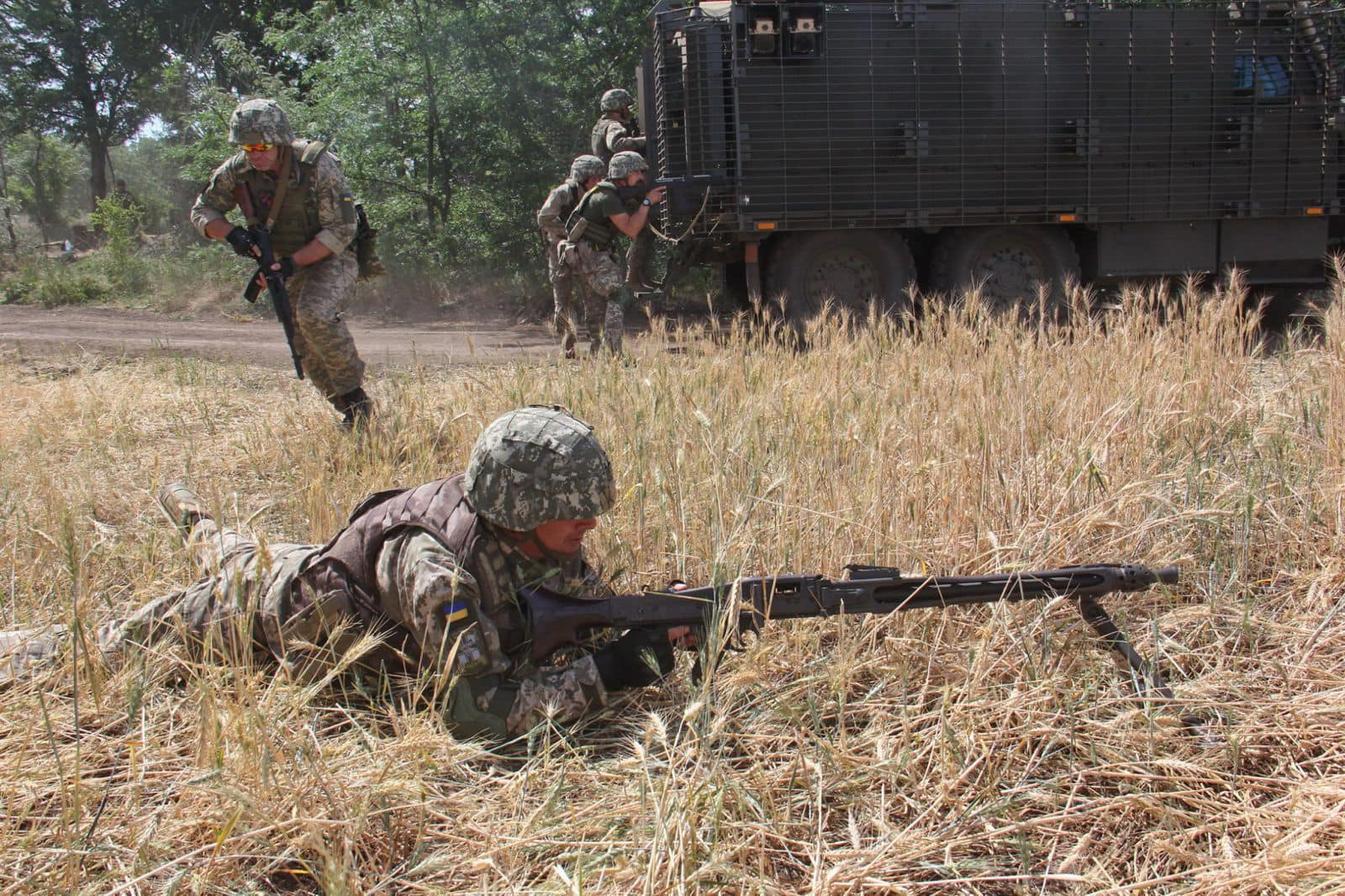
Ukrainian Naval Infantry with an MG3 during the Russian invasion of Ukraine

- Afghanistan: Used by the Mujahideen and Taliban
- Albania: Used by the Albanian Army.
- Argentina: Used by the Argentine Army.
- Austria: Uses the MG 74 which is a MG-42/59 variant licensed from Beretta and manufactured by Steyr Mannlicher. The MG 74's cyclic rate of fire is 850 rounds per minute.
- Azerbaijan: The Military of Azerbaijan acquired a small quantity of MKEK MG3s from Turkey.
- Bangladesh
- Brazil: MG3 and MG3A1 are used by the Brazilian Army at the Leopard 1A5 BR.
- Canada: Only used on 20 Leopard 2A6M CAN tanks acquired from Germany. Leopard 2s acquired from other sources will continue to use the FN MAG.
- Cape Verde
- Chile
- Cyprus
- Czech Republic: Used on Dingo 2.
- Denmark: MG-42/59 designated M/62 in Danish service.
- Estonia Designated as MG3.
- Finland: As the 7.62 KK MG3. Used with the Leopard 2 tanks and NH90 helicopters.
- Germany: Used by the Bundeswehr.
- Ghana
- Greece: License production by Hellenic Defence Systems (also known as EAS).
- Iceland: Used by the Icelandic Coast Guard.
- Indonesia: License production.
- Iran: License production by Defense Industries Organization as the MGA3. Used by Iranian Army. Installed on Zulfiqar MBT.
- Kurdistan: Peshmerga of Iraqi Kurdistan autonomous region, 40 MG3s supplied by Germany and 100 MG-42/59 by Italy.
- Italy: License production of the MG-42/59 by Beretta with parts made by Whitehead Motofides and Luigi Franchi; while largely replaced in squad support weapon role by the Belgian FN Minimi, it still sees widespread mounted use on ground-based vehicles and helicopters. Prior to the procurement of the Minimi, the Stabilimento Militare Armi Leggere (SMAL) at Terni has developed a kit to adapt the Italian Army's existing MG-42/59 machine guns to accommodate 5.56×45mm NATO ammunition. The kit comprises a new barrel, bolt head, feed opening and cover, recoil-enhancing element and a lighter bolt. The weight of the modified 5.56 mm MG-42/59 machine gun remains unchanged from the original version.
- Latvia: used by the Latvian Land Forces.
- Libya
- Lithuania: used by the Lithuanian Armed Forces.
- Mexico: License produced by SEDENA in Mexico.
- Myanmar Clones made in Myanmar as the MA 15.
- Niger
- Nigeria
- Norway In use by the Home Guard and Navy. Replaced in Army service by the FN Minimi and FN MAG in 2019.
- Pakistan: Used by the Pakistan Army. Manufactured under license by Pakistan Ordnance Factories from 1960s in Wah Cantt.
- Philippines: Used by the Philippine National Police.
- Poland: On Leopard 2 tanks and support vehicles. Intended to be replaced by UKM-2000 and WKM-B.
- Portugal
- Sao Tome and Principe
- Saudi Arabia
- Slovakia: Mounted on Leopard 2A4.
- Spain: Made under license.
- Sri Lanka Used by the Sri Lankan Armed Forces in limited numbers.
- Sudan: Made by Military Industry Corporation as the Karar.
- Sweden: As the KSP m/94. Used with the Leopard 2 tanks.
- Thailand: Used on Commando V-150 APC.
- Togo
- Tunisia
- Turkey: Made by MKEK in Kırıkkale under license since 1974 for the Turkish Armed Forces and Turkish Gendarmerie.
- Ukraine: Ukrainian armed forces have been given MG3 to aid them in the Russian invasion of 2022. At least 130 MG3 have been provided by Germany.
- Uruguay
- Yemen: pro-Saudi forces and Al-Qaeda in the Arabian Peninsula.

=== Non state users ===
- ISIL
- Provisional IRA

=== Former users ===
- Australia: The MG3 was used between 1976 and 2007 as an anti-aircraft weapon on the Australian Army's Leopard AS1 MBT.

== Conflicts ==
- Myanmar Conflict (1948–present)
- Nigerian Civil War (1967–1970)
- The Troubles (Late 1960s–1998)
- Bangladesh Liberation War (1971)
- Lebanese Civil War (1975–1990)
- Kurdistan Workers Party Insurgency (1978 - present)
- Afghan Conflict (1978–present)
- Iran–Iraq War (1980–1988)
- Second Sudanese Civil War (1983–2005)
- Somali Civil War (1988–present)
- Afghan Civil War (1992–1996)
- Kargil War (1999)
- Iraqi Conflict (2003–present)
- Insurgency in Khyber Pakhtunkhwa (2004–present)
- Boko Haram insurgency (2009–present)
- Libyan Crisis (2011–present)
- Syrian Civil War (2011–2024)
- Russo-Ukrainian War (2014–present)
- Yemeni Civil War (2015–present)
- Myanmar Civil War (2021–present)

== See also ==
- MG51—7.5×55mm Swiss general-purpose machine gun
- SIG 710-3—Swiss derivative of MG 42

== Citations ==
- Ezell, Edward C. (1988). Small Arms Today 2nd Edition. Harrisburg, PA: Stackpole Books.
- Woźniak, Ryszard (2001). Encyklopedia najnowszej broni palnej—tom 3 M-P (in Polish). Warsaw: Bellona. ISBN 83-11-09311-3.
