= ZB vz. 26 =

ZB-26
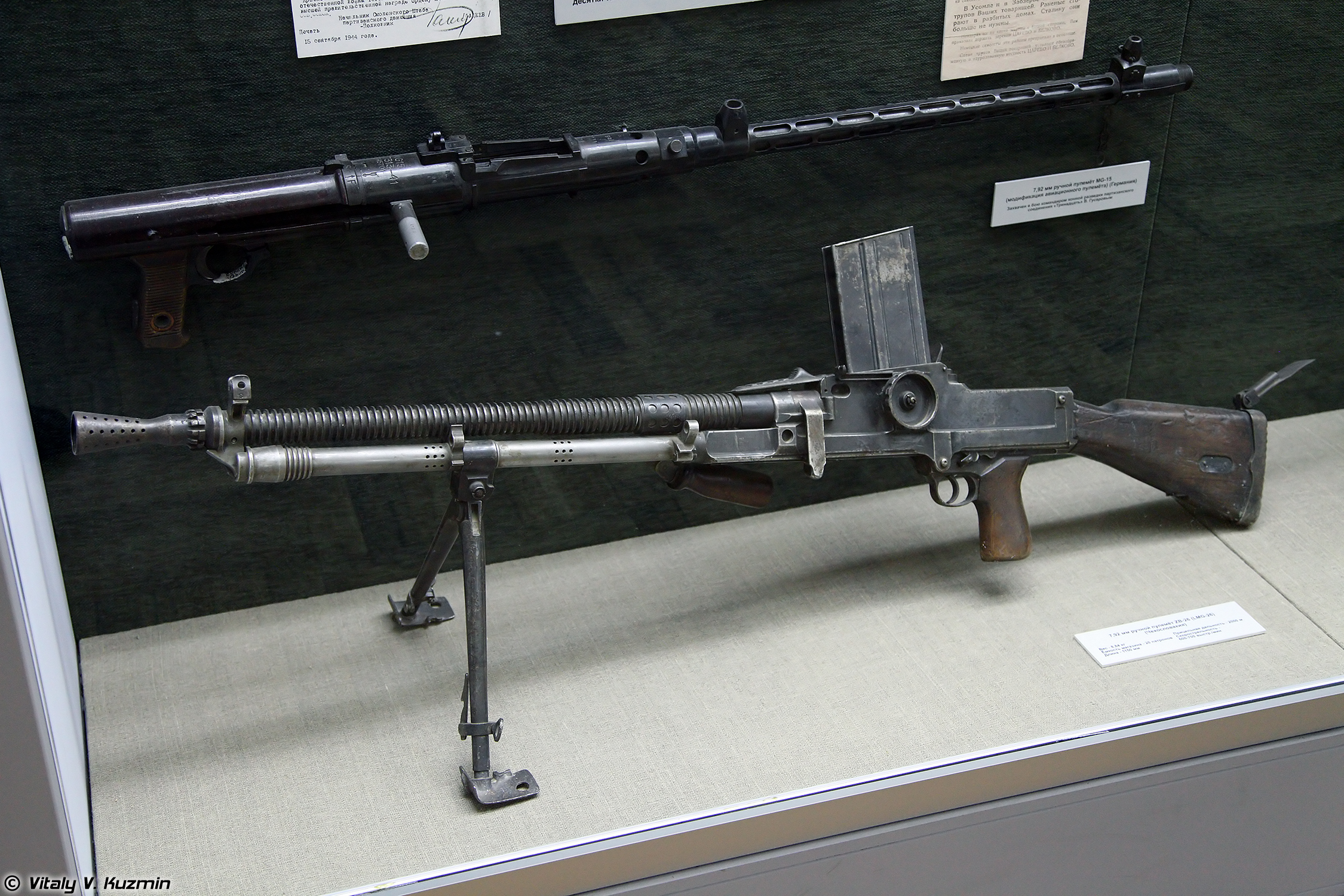
- ZB-26 at the Great Patriotic War Museum, Smolensk
- Type: Light machine gun
- Place of origin: Czechoslovakia

Service history
- In service: 1926–2001
- Used by: See § Users
- Wars: See § Conflicts

Production history
- Designer: Václav Holek
- Designed: 1924
- Manufacturer: Zbrojovka Brno; Zastava Arms (License); Gongxian Arsenal (License)
- Produced: 1924–1953
- Variants: See § Variants

Specifications
- Mass: 9.65 kg (21.27 lb)
- Length: 1,161 mm (45.7 in)
- Barrel length: 672 mm (26.5 in)
- Cartridge: 7.92×57mm Mauser
- Action: Gas-operated, tilting breechblock
- Rate of fire: 500 rounds/min
- Muzzle velocity: 764 m/s (2,507 ft/s)
- Effective firing range: 1,000 m (1,100 yd)
- Feed system: 20- or 30-round detachable box magazine
- Sights: Front blade, rear leaf sight

The ZB-26 was a Czechoslovak light machine gun developed in the 1920s, which went on to enter service with several countries. It saw its major use during World War II, and spawned the related ZB vz. 27, vz. 30, and vz. 33. The ZB vz. 26 influenced many other light machine gun designs. The British Bren light machine gun was a modified ZB vz. 26 licensed to Britain by Czechoslovakia, and the Japanese Type 97 heavy tank machine gun was designed from captured ZB vz. 26s in the Second Sino-Japanese War. The ZB-26 is famous for its reliability, simple components, quick-change barrel and ease of manufacturing.

This light machine gun in the Czechoslovak army was marked as the LK vz. 26 ("LK" means lehký kulomet, light machine gun; "vz." stands for vzor, Model in Czech). ZB vz. 26 is incorrect nomenclature because "ZB-26" is a factory designation (Zbrojovka Brno), while "vzor 26" or "vz. 26" is an army designation.

== Development ==
In around 1921 the military of the young Czechoslovak state embarked on a quest for a light machine gun of their own. Early trials included foreign designs such as Berthier, M1918 Browning automatic rifle, Darne machine gun, Hotchkiss M1914 machine gun, Madsen machine gun, St. Étienne Mle 1907, and several domestic designs. Of these, the most important was the Praha II, a lightweight, belt-fed weapon built at Česka Zbrojovka (CZ) Praha (Czech Arms factory in Prague).

Development of the ZB-26 began in 1923 after the Czechoslovak Brno arms factory was built. Since CZ-Praha was a relatively small factory with limited industrial capabilities, it was decided to transfer the production of the new automatic weapon to the more advanced Zbrojovka Brno, or ZB in short. This transfer resulted in a long series of court trials over royalties, between the owners of the design (CZ-Praha) and the manufacturer (ZB). Designer Václav Holek was charged by the Czechoslovak army with producing a new light machine gun. He was assisted by his brother Emmanuel, as well an Austrian and a Polish engineer, respectively named Marek and Podrabsky. Holek quickly began work on the prototype of the Praha II and within a year the quartet had created an automatic light machine gun that was later known as the ZB.

Before long, the Holek brothers abandoned the belt feed in favor of a top-feeding box magazine and the resulting weapon, known as the Praha I-23, was selected. Despite the past legal troubles, manufacture of the new weapon had commenced at the ZB factory by late 1926, and it became the standard light machine gun of the Czechoslovak Army by 1928.

== Design ==
The ZB-26 is a gas-operated, air-cooled, selective-fire machine gun. It has a finned, quick-detachable barrel and fires from an open bolt. Its action is powered by a long-stroke gas piston, located below the barrel. The gas block is mounted at the muzzle end of the barrel and also serves as the front sight base. The action is locked by tipping the rear of the bolt (breechblock) upwards, and into a locking recess in the receiver. The return spring is located in the butt of the weapon, and is connected to the bolt carrier/gas piston via a long rod; additionally, there is a short spring buffer located around the return spring at the juncture of the receiver and butt, which softens the impact of the bolt group at the end of its rearward stroke.

Its charging handle is located at the right side of receiver and does not reciprocate when the gun is fired. The ammunition feed is from a top-mounted box magazine made from sheet steel, holding just 20 rounds in a two-row configuration. The magazine housing has a forward-sliding dust cover. Spent cartridges are ejected downwards. The ejection port is normally closed with its own dust cover which opens automatically once the trigger is pressed. The trigger unit permits both single shots and automatic fire, selectable through a safety/fire mode selector lever situated at the left side of the pistol grip. The gun fires from an open bolt and the spring-loaded firing pin is operated by a projection on the bolt carrier, once the bolt is fully in battery and locked. Because of the overhead magazine, the sight line is offset to the left, and the front sight is mounted on a base which protrudes upward and to the left from the gas block.

The rear sight is attached to the left side of receiver, and has a range adjustment mechanism controlled by a knurled rotating knob. Standard furniture consists of an integral folding bipod, which is attached to the gas cylinder tube, and a wooden butt with a spring-buffered buttplate and a folding shoulder rest plate. Although the ZB-26 was intended for the light machine gun role, it was also offered with a sustained-fire tripod, and provided with a sufficient supply of full magazines and spare barrels it could serve (to some extent) as a medium machine gun. The same tripod was also adaptable for the anti-aircraft role.

== Deployment and service ==
The ZB-26 saw service with the Czechoslovak infantry from 1928, as well as being the primary or secondary armament on many later model Škoda armored vehicles. 45,132 were bought by Czechoslovakia during the interwar. It is believed that the ZB factory turned more than 120,000 ZB-26 guns between 1926 and 1939 in a variety of calibers (the most popular being its original 7.92×57mm Mauser). It was exported to twenty-four European, South American and Asian countries, both in its original form and in the slightly improved ZB-30 version. Large batches of ZB light machine guns went to Bolivia, Bulgaria, China, Romania, Turkey and Yugoslavia. Lithuania and Yugoslavia were the first users to adopt the gun, before the Czechoslovak Army. Exports continued until 1939, when Nazi Germany under Adolf Hitler took over Czechoslovakia. More were produced for export than for the Czechoslovak Army 7,136 ZB-26 were produced in Czechoslovakia after the war, from 1945 to 1953.

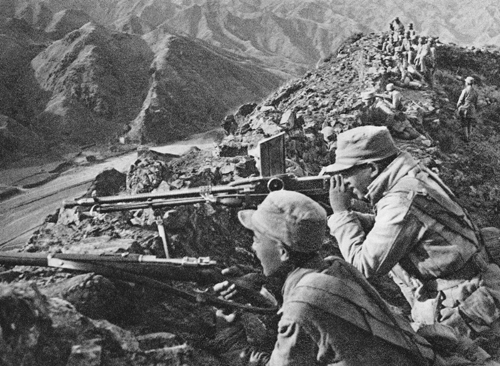
Chinese soldiers were the main ZB-26 users during World War II.

The Wehrmacht soon adopted the ZB-26 after the occupation of Czechoslovakia, renaming it the MG 26(t); it was used in the same role as the MG 34, as a light machine gun. In the opening phases of World War II, the ZB-26 in 7.92 mm Mauser caliber was used in large numbers by elements of the German Waffen-SS, who at first did not have full access to standard Wehrmacht supply channels. In its most famous incarnation, the ZB-26 was modified by ZB and British technicians, entering service as the famous Bren gun. Many more countries imported or produced the design under license, including China and Yugoslavia. Chinese Nationalist forces used the ZB-26 chambered for the 7.92×57mm Mauser round in their struggle with Communist Chinese and later Imperial Japanese forces. Likewise, the Chinese Red Army (as with any other captured weapon) turned the Nationalists' ZB-26 machine guns against them and the Japanese. According to Brno, from 1927 to 1939, a total of 30,249 ZB-26 were exported to China. Various Chinese pro-Japanese forces, such as the Collaborationist Chinese Army or the Inner Mongolian Army, used it. During this time due to high demand, Chinese small-arms factories—state-owned as well as those controlled by various warlords—were producing the ZB-26 as the Type 26. During the Korean War, Chinese Communist forces employed the ZB-26/Type 26 against UN forces, and PVA ZB gunners developed a well-deserved reputation for long-range marksmanship. During the First Indochina War with French and later South Vietnamese forces, the ZB-26/Type 26 was found in the hands of both North Vietnamese Army and Viet Minh guerrillas.

== Variants ==
=== Czech variants ===
- Praha vz. 24 — Prototype produced at the Praga arms factory. Can be distinguished from the ZB-26 since the whole barrel is ribbed instead of up to half way.
- ZB-26 (Vz. 26) — First production model. Produced since 1926 with continuous minor improvements until full scale production from 1928 onward.
- ZB-27 (Vz. 27) — Updated ZB-26 with various small improvements to the components of the gas operated action and bolt, proposed to Portugal, Romania and United Kingdom. Further updates resulted in the ZB-30.
- ZB-30 (Vz. 30) — Second production model (slightly longer, heavier, and higher cyclic RoF). Produced since 1932 with various improvements to the gas system, bolt design,...
- ZB-30J — Variant of the ZB-30 developed for export to Yugoslavia, features an adjustable gas system for compatibility with both light and heavy ball 7.92mm Mauser ammunition. Also produced in 7mm Mauser for Venezuela.
- ZGB-30 — Updated ZB-27 design at the request of the British for trials. Modified for use with cordite-filled ammunition and rimmed .303 British cartridges, later updated to the ZGB-33.
- ZGB-33 — Variant of the ZB-30 for use with rimmed ammunition. Produced under license in the UK as the Bren light machine gun. Sold commercially since 1935 by ZB in .303 British to a handful of nations.
- ZB-39 (Vz. 39) — Later production commercial model of the ZGB-33 that is nearly identical to the British produced Bren, with many internal parts even being interchangeable, except for the magazine. It was chambered in various different rounds and having different sights, including anti-aircraft sights. Sales of the ZGB-33 morphed into the ZB-39, such as the sales to Iraq and Bulgaria.
- ZB-501 (Vz. 52) — Post-war derivative of the ZB-26.

=== Foreign variants ===
- Bren Mk I —
- Type 97 — A Japanese license built copy of the ZB-26 (chambered in 7.7×58mm Arisaka) and intended for use in Japanese tanks. It was not normally issued as an infantry light machine gun. Other than the cocking handle being moved from the right side of the receiver to the left it is essentially a duplicate of the Czech gun in operation.
- Fusil ametrallador Oviedo — A post-war Spanish clone of the ZB-26 / ZB-30.

More designations appear depending on the adopting army, though generally the gun retains its 'ZB 26' initials in one form or another.

== Manufacturers ==
ZB-26 manufacturers
Zbrojovka Brno
Military Technical Institute Kragujevac (License)
Gongxian Arsenal (License)
ZB-30 manufacturers
Zbrojovka Brno
Cugir Arms Factory (License)
Military Technical Institute Kragujevac (License)

== Users ==
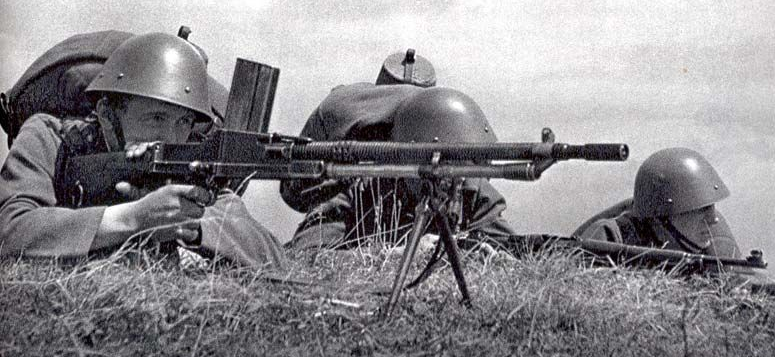
Czechoslovak soldiers with a ZB vz. 26 and a vz. 24

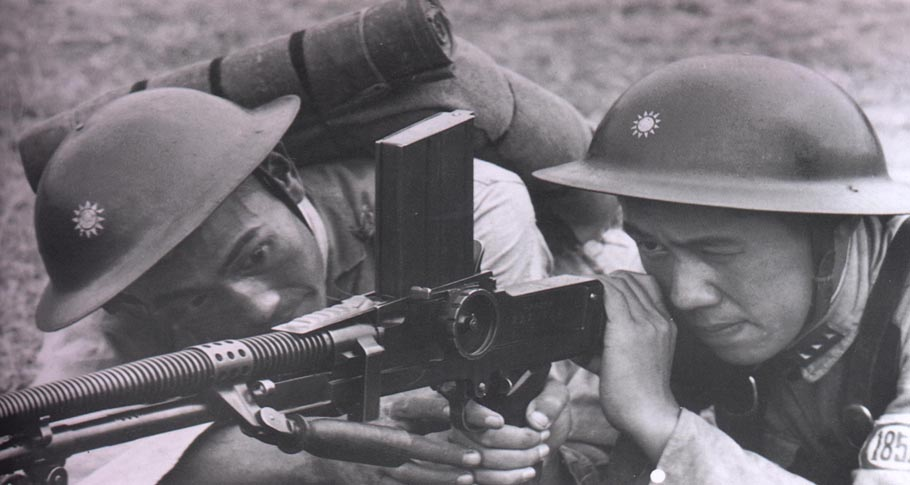
Chinese National Revolutionary Army soldiers firing the ZB vz. 26.

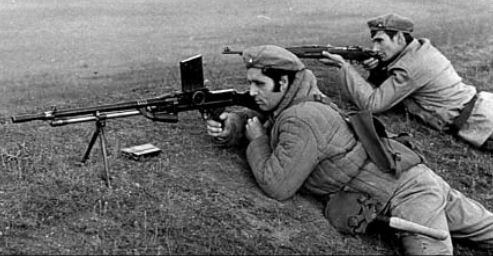
A license-built Romanian ZB-30 used after the war by the Patriotic Guards.

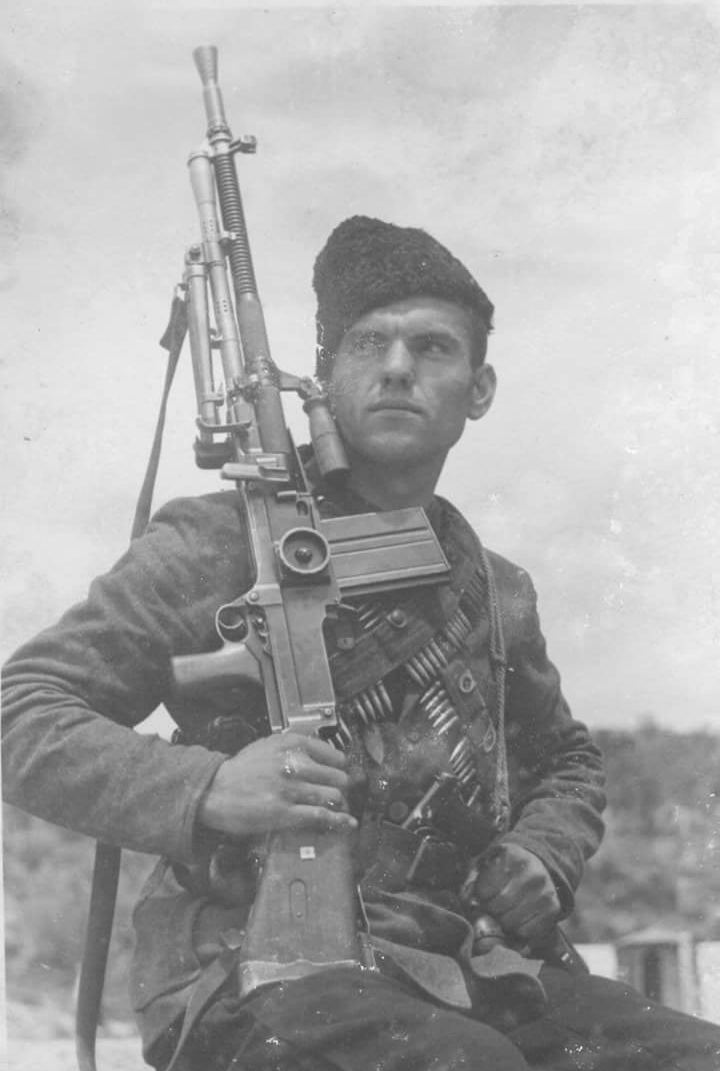
Yugoslav Chetnik fighter with M37.

- Afghanistan — 2,000 Czech-made ZB-30 (chambered in 7.92mm Mauser) shipped in 1938.
- Algeria — ZB-30 used by the National Liberation Army.
- Biafra
- Bolivia — 3,350 Czech-made ZB-30 (chambered in 7.65mm Mauser) between 1932 and 1937, used in the Chaco War, still in use in the 1960s
- Brazil — 1,080 in 7mm Mauser received in 1930 for the Polícia Militar de Minas Gerais (Military Police of the state of Minas Gerais). Adopted by the São Paulo Public Force
- Bulgaria — Ordered 3,000 Czech-made ZB-39 "Bren" guns in the end of 1938, designated as the kartěnice 39 (chambered in 8×56mmR using 25-round box magazine). 100 delivered before German occupation of Czechoslovakia. The rest were delivered after Germany allowing continued weapon sales.
- Chile — 11 in 7mm received in 1928
- China
- China (ROC) — 30,249 received between 1927 and 1939. Produced under license. Clones made in Taku Naval Dockyard in 1927, later produced in Gongxian Arsenal, the 21st/51st Arsenals.
- Croatia
- Czechoslovakia — Adopted by the Czechoslovak Army as the LK vz. 26.
- Ecuador — 200 supplied in 1930-1932
- Egypt — 1,060 7.7mm ZGB-33 bought in 1937-1939
- Ethiopia — Used against the Italians
- Germany
- Indonesia — Free Aceh Movement
- Imperial State of Iran — ZB vz. 30 produced under license 6,000 ZB-26 received in 1934
- Iraq — 850 7.7mm ZGB-33 received in 1936-1937
- Japan — Used captured Chinese guns 2,200 others were received in 1938-1939
- Latvia — 600 7.7mm ZGB-33 ordered in 1940
- Lithuania — 3,138 VZ 26 machine guns between 1928 and 1937 (7,92 mm kulkosvaidis Brno 26 m.)
- Manchukuo
- Namibia — Used by the People's Liberation Army of Namibia.
- North Korea
- Paraguay — Captured from Bolivian Army during Chaco War, some still in use for training.
- Peru
- Romania — 17,131 Czech-made ZB-30 were imported in 1933. 10,000 ZB-30 were license-produced at Cugir, with a production rate of 250 pieces per month as of October 1942.
- (Thailand) Siam — Bought some in the early 1930s
- (Slovakia) Slovak Republic
- Spain
- Sweden — Used as the Kulsprutegevär m/39
- Turkey
- United Kingdom — 85 Czech-made ZGB-33 "Bren" in 7.7mm bought from 1935 to 1938
- North Vietnam
- Yugoslavia — 1,500 Czech-made ZB-26 delivered
  - Yugoslav Partisans

== Conflicts ==
ZB-26
Constitutionalist Revolution (1932)
Chaco War (1932–1935)
2^{nd} Italo-Ethiopian War (1935–1937)
Spanish Civil War (1936–1939)
Dersim Massacre (1937–1938)
2^{nd} Sino-Japanese War (1937–1945)
Sudeten German uprising (1938)
World War II
Ecuadorian–Peruvian War
Chinese Civil War
Ifni war (1957-1958)
Korean War
Indochina War
Vietnam War
Laotian Civil War
Biafran war
Insurgency in Aceh
South African Border War
Soviet–Afghan War

== See also ==
- Weapons of Czechoslovakia interwar period

=== Weapons of comparable role, performance and era ===
- FM 24/29
- Lahti-Saloranta M/26
- Madsen
- Mendoza RM2
- Type 96 — influenced by ZB vz. 26 design
- Type 99 — follow on to the Type 96
