= List of World War II weapons of Finland =

Finnish weaponry throughout 1939–1945

This is a list of World War II weapons used by Finland. Finland fought in three conflicts during World War II; the Winter War (1939–1940), the Continuation War (1941–1944), and the Lapland War (1944–1945).

== Small arms ==
=== Sidearms ===
- Astra 300
- Beholla Pistol
- Beretta 1917
- Beretta 1922
- Beretta 1934
- Beretta 1935
- Browning Hi-Power
- Colt 1911
- FN 1900
- FN 1903
- FN 1910
- Husqvarna 1907
- Lahti L-35
- M/23 parabellum pistol (Luger pistol)
- Mauser 1914
- Mauser C96
- Nagant M1895
- Ruby
- TT-33
- VZ 24
- VZ 38
- Walther Model 4

=== Rifles ===
- AVS-36
- Berdan rifle (Small amounts used by supply corps and homefronts troops)
- Carcano (named the M/38 "Terni" in Finnish service)
- Fedorov Avtomat (Captured from Soviets)
- Karabiner 98k
- Mosin–Nagant and Finnish variants(Finnish produced variants)
- SVT-38
- SVT-40
- Winchester 1895

=== Submachine guns ===
- Suomi KP/-31
- MP 28
- MP38 (Delivered with German vehicles)
- MP40 (Delivered with German vehicles)
- KP m/44 submachine gun
- PPD-34 (Captured)
- PPD-38 (Captured)
- PPD-40 (Captured)
- PPS-42 (Captured)
- PPS-43 (Captured)
- PPSh-41 (Captured)
- SIG M1920
- SIG MKMS

=== Machine guns ===
- Lahti-Saloranta M/26
- Chauchat
- DS-39 (Captured)
- Degtyaryov machine gun(Some of the guns captured by Finland during the Winter War were used for research and production)
- FN Model D
- Lewis Gun (Limited used on aircraft and as anti-air guns)
- Maxim M/1905
- Maxim M/1910
- Maxim M/09-21
- Maxim M/32-33
- MG08 (Used by coastal troops and on fortifications)
- Schwarzlose
- Vickers machine gun (Used by navy and home front troops)

=== Grenades ===
- M/32 Varsikäsikranaatti
- M/32 Munakäsikranaatti
- F1 Grenade (called the munakäsikranaatti F sirpalevaikutteinen in Finnish service)
- OF1 Grenade (called the munakäsikranaatti O.F. miinavaikutteinen)

== Artillery ==
=== Field artillery ===
- Canon de 75 modèle 1897
- Ehrhardt 7.5 cm Model 1901
- 76 mm gun M1900
- 76 mm divisional gun M1902
- 76 mm infantry gun Model 1913 & 76 LK/10/13 variants
- Canon de 75 modèle 1922 Schneider
- 76 mm regimental gun M1927
- 76 mm divisional gun M1936 (F-22)
- 87 mm light field gun M1877
- De Bange 90 mm cannon
- 42-line field gun M1877
- QF 4.5-inch howitzer
- Canon de 105 mle 1913 Schneider
- 10.5 cm kanon m/34
- 107 mm gun M1910/30
- 122 mm howitzer M1910

=== Heavy Artillery ===
- Type 38 15 cm howitzer
- 152 mm howitzer M1910
- 152 mm howitzer M1909/30
- Canon de 155 C modèle 1917 Schneider

== Anti-tank weapons ==
=== Anti-tank guns ===
- Bofors 37 mm anti-tank gun
- 45 mm anti-tank gun M1937 (53-K)
- 25 mm APX modèle 1937
- Madsen 20 mm cannon

=== Anti-tank rifles ===
- Boys anti-tank rifle
- Lahti L-39
- PTRD-41 (Captured)
- PTRS-41 (Captured)
- Solothurn S-18/1000
- Solothurn S-18/154
- Wz. 35 anti-tank rifle

=== Shoulder-Fired weapons ===
- Panzerfaust
- Panzerschreck

=== Other ===
- Molotov cocktail

== Armoured fighting vehicles(AFV) ==
=== Tanks ===
- Renault FT
- Carden Loyd tankette
- Vickers 6-Ton
- T-26
- T-28
- BT-5
- BT-7
- BT-42
- T-34
- KV-1
- T-37A tank
- T-38 tank
- T-50 tank
- SU-76
- SU-152
- ISU-152
- Panzer IVJ
- Sturmgeschütz IIIG

=== Armoured cars ===
- FAI armoured car
