= Maxim gun =

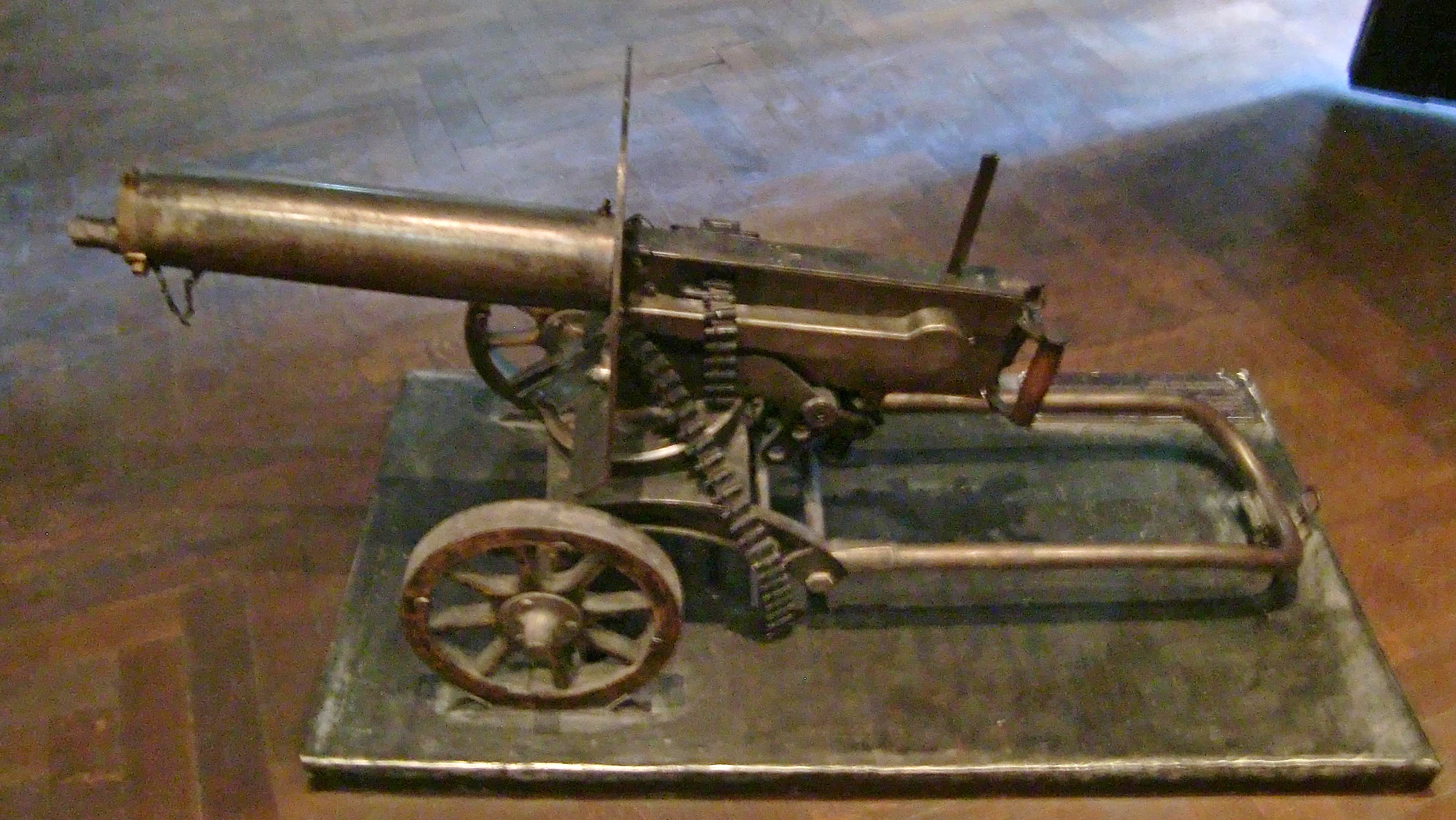
- Maxim machine gun at Georgian National Museum
- Type: Heavy machine gun
- Place of origin: United Kingdom

Service history
- In service: 1886–present
- Used by: See § Users
- Wars: See § Conflicts

Production history
- Designer: Sir Hiram Stevens Maxim
- Manufacturer: See § Manufacturers
- Variants: See § Variants / Derivatives

Specifications
- Mass: 27.2 kg (59.97 lb)
- Length: 1,079 mm (42.48 in)
- Barrel length: 673 mm (26.5 in)
- Crew: 4
- Cartridge: 6.5x52mm Carcano; 6.5×58mm Vergueiro; 7×57mm Mauser; 7.62×54mmR; 7.65×53mm Argentine; 7.62x65mm; 7.62×63mm Springfield; 7.7×56mmR British; 7.92×57mm Mauser; 8×50mmR Lebel; 10.35×47mmR; 11.43×60mmR Martini–Henry; 11×59mmR Gras
- Action: Recoil-operated
- Rate of fire: 550–600 rounds/min
- Muzzle velocity: 744 m/s (2,440 ft/s)
- Feed system: 250-round canvas belt
- Sights: Iron sights

The Maxim gun is a recoil-operated machine gun invented in 1884 by Hiram Maxim. It was the first fully automatic machine gun.

The Maxim gun has been called "the weapon most associated with imperial conquest" by historian Martin Gilbert, and was heavily used by colonial powers during the Scramble for Africa. Afterwards, Maxim guns also saw extensive use by different armies during various conflicts, including the Russo-Japanese War and the First and Second World Wars.

The Maxim gun was greatly influential in the development of machine guns, and it has multiple variants and derivatives, such as the Vickers, PM M1910, and MG 08. Some are still in service to the present day and used in contemporary conflicts, such as the Russo-Ukrainian War.

== Design ==
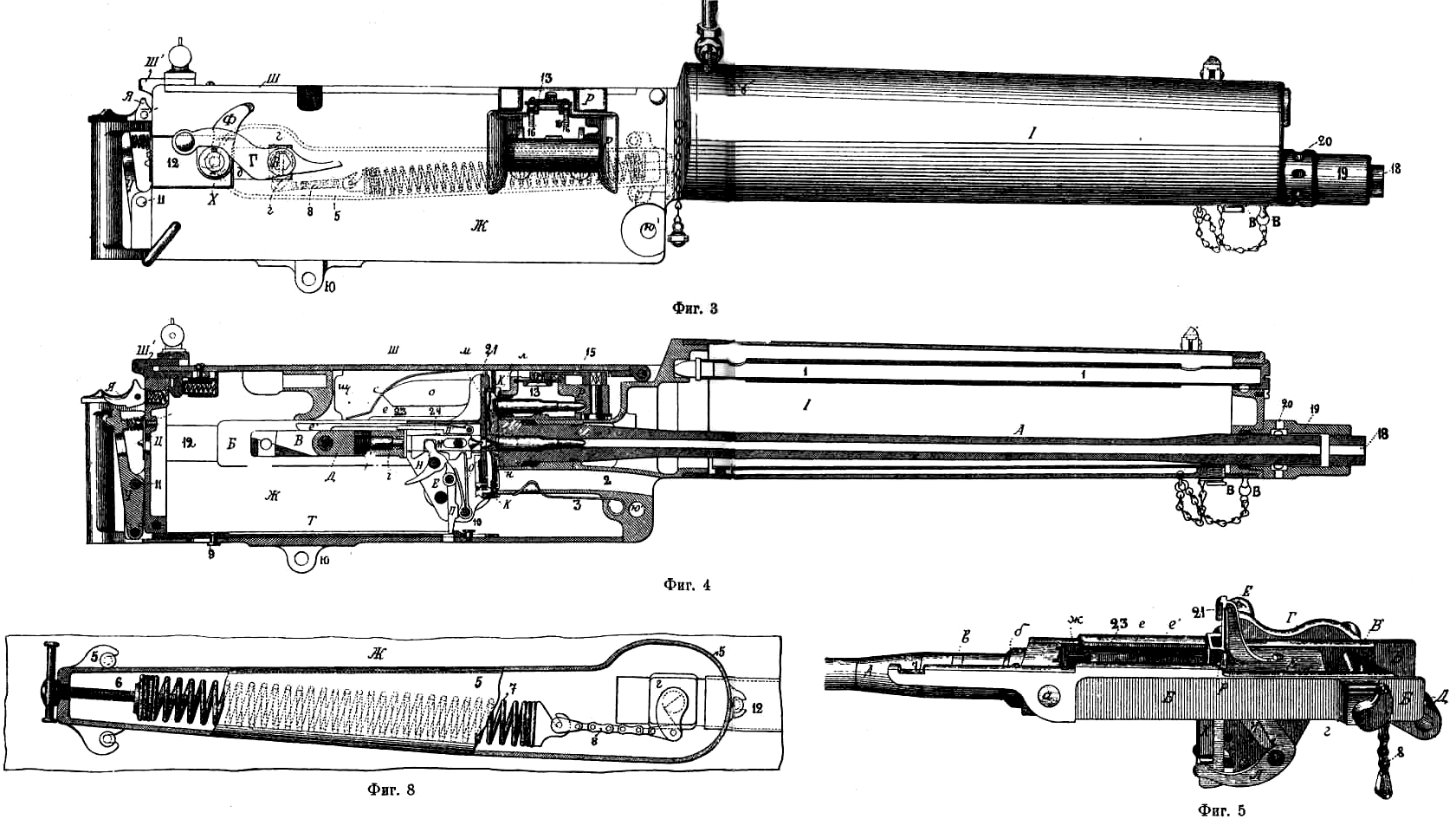
Illustration of the Maxim gun in Brockhaus and Efron Encyclopedic Dictionary, 1905

The Maxim gun featured one of the earliest recoil-operated firing systems in history. Energy from recoil acting on the breech block is used to eject each spent cartridge and insert the next one. Maxim's earliest designs used a 360-degree rotating cam to reverse the movement of the block, but this was later simplified to a toggle lock. This made it vastly more efficient and less labor-intensive than previous manually operated rapid-firing guns, such as the manually cranked Mitrailleuse of 1851, the Gatling gun of 1861, the Gardner gun of 1874, or the Nordenfelt gun of 1873.

The Maxim gun is water cooled, allowing it to sustain its rate of fire far longer than air-cooled guns. The extra weight and complexity this added, however, made it heavier and less flexible in use.

Trials demonstrated that the Maxim can fire 600 rounds per minute (equal to 60 riflemen at the time). Compared to modern machine guns, the Maxim is heavy, bulky, and awkward. A lone soldier can fire the weapon, but it was usually operated by a team of men, usually 4 to 6 in number. Apart from the gunner, other crew are needed to speed reload, spot targets, and carry and ready ammunition and water. Several men are needed to move or mount the heavy weapon.

== Production company ==
In 1884, Maxim began to develop his machine gun in Hatton Garden, London. That November he founded the Maxim Gun Company with financing from Albert Vickers, son of steel entrepreneur Edward Vickers. A blue plaque on the factory where Maxim invented and produced the gun is located in Hatton Garden at the junction with Clerkenwell Road in London.

Albert Vickers became the company's chairman, and it later joined hands with a Swedish competitor, Nordenfelt, to become Maxim Nordenfelt Guns and Ammunition Company. The Post Office Directory of trades in London of 1895 lists its office at 32 Victoria Street SW (London) on page 1579.

Finally, the company was absorbed into the mother Vickers company, leading first to the Vickers-Maxim gun and then, after Vickers' redesign, the Vickers machine gun.

== History ==
=== Development (1883–1884) ===
Maxim's first British patents relating to the development of the Maxim gun were granted in June and July 1883. The first prototype was demonstrated to invited guests in October 1884.

=== Use in colonial warfare (1886–1914) ===
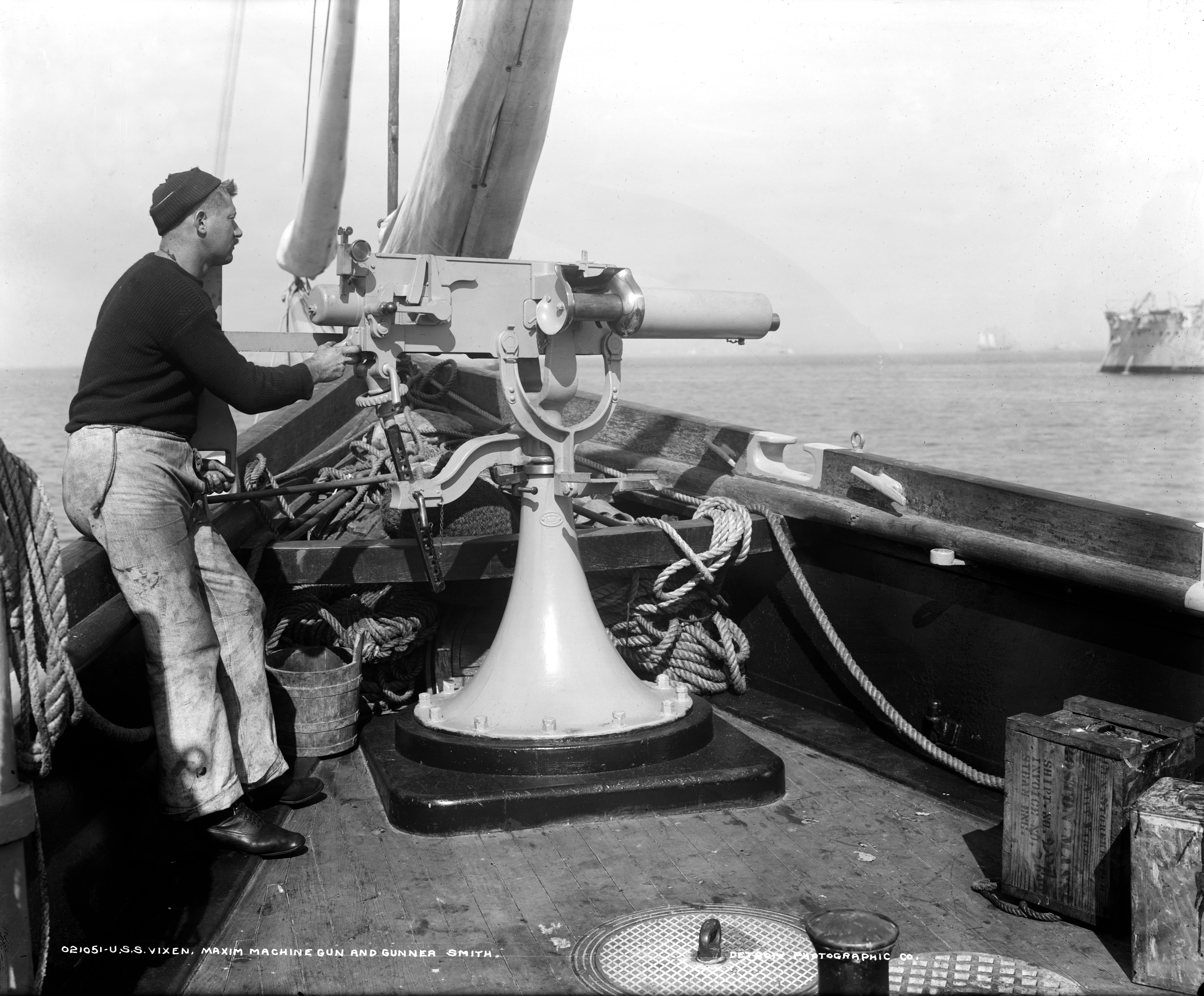
A large-bore Maxim on the USS Vixen c. 1898

A prototype of the Maxim gun was given by Hiram Maxim to the Emin Pasha Relief Expedition in 1886–1890, under the leadership of Henry Morton Stanley. More a publicity stunt than a serious military contribution, in view of the main financier of the expedition, William Mackinnon, "merely exhibiting" the gun was likely to "prove a great peace-preserver". The weapon was used on several occasions, especially during the expedition's retreat from central Africa, not because of its devastating effects, but as an effective means to scare off attackers. One of the first uses of the Maxim gun by British Forces was in the 1887 Yoni Expedition. The same prototype used by Stanley was brought back to central Africa by Frederick Lugard, where it played an instrumental role in the establishment of the Uganda Protectorate.

The first unit in the world to receive the Maxim was the expeditionary force led by Hermann Wissmann which was sent in 1888 by the German Imperial government to its colonies in East Africa to suppress the Abushiri revolt. Wissmann was issued one of the first Maxim guns which had reached Germany and used it successfully in his capture of Pangani.

The Singapore Volunteer Corps received a Maxim gun in 1889, but it was never used. This was a civilian volunteer defence unit on the British colony.

The Maxim gun was first used extensively in an African conflict during the First Matabele War in Rhodesia. During the Battle of the Shangani on 25 October 1893, 700 soldiers fought off 5,000 Matabele warriors with just five Maxim guns. It played an important role in the "Scramble for Africa" in the late 19th century. The extreme lethality was employed to devastating effect against obsolete charging tactics, when African opponents could be lured into pitched battles in open terrain. As it was put by Hilaire Belloc, in the words of the figure "Blood" in his poem "The Modern Traveller":

Whatever happens, we have got
The Maxim gun, and they have not.

However, the destructive power of the Maxim gun in colonial warfare has often been embellished by popular myth. Modern historical accounts suggest that, while it was effective in pitched battles, as in the Matabele wars or the Battle of Omdurman, its significance owed much to its psychological impact.

A larger-calibre version of the Maxim, firing a one-pound shell, was built by Maxim-Nordenfelt. This was known in the Second Boer War (in South Africa) as the Pom-Pom from its sound. The Boers' "one-pounder" Maxim-Nordenfelt was a large-caliber, belt-fed, water-cooled "auto cannon" that fired explosive rounds (smokeless ammunition) at 450 rounds per minute.

The Maxim gun was also used in the Anglo-Aro War (in present-day Nigeria) of 1901–1902.

National and military authorities were reluctant to adopt the weapon, and Maxim's company initially had some trouble convincing European governments of the weapon's efficiency. Soldiers generally held a great mistrust of machine guns due to their tendency to jam. In the 1906 version of his book Small Wars, Charles Callwell says of machine guns: "The older forms are not suitable as a rule... they jammed at Ulundi, they jammed at Dogali, they jammed at Abu Klea and Tofrek, in some cases with unfortunate results." However, the Maxim was far more reliable than its contemporaries. A more immediate problem was that, initially, its position was easily given away by the clouds of smoke that the gun produced (although the same was true of artillery pieces and units of troops that the machine gun was intended to replace or supplement, so this wasn't viewed as a particular drawback by the early users). The advent of smokeless powder (developed by, among others, Hiram's brother Hudson Maxim), helped to change this.

The weapon was adopted by the British Army under the guidance of Sir Garnet Wolseley, who had been appointed Commander-in-Chief of the British Army in 1888. In October that year, he placed an order of 120 rifle-calibre Maxims using the same .577/450 ammunition as the Martini–Henry rifles. Wolseley had previously led military expeditions in Africa (the Ashanti war and the Gordon Relief Expedition in 1884–85) and had a reputation for being a strong subscriber to military innovation and reform, which he demonstrated in Africa. There he used machine guns, explored other unconventional ideas, and founded an Egyptian camel corps.

The gun's design was also purchased and used by several other European countries, such as Austria-Hungary, Italy, Switzerland, and Russia.

In January 1899, just before the outbreak of the Philippine-American War, the Philippines had forty-two Maxim guns. An English observer who had seen one of them described it as being "of the most improved type."

Portugal adopted the Maxim for use in Africa in replacement of the aging Nordenfelt guns then in service, and used them in the Portuguese conquest of Barue among other campaigns.

=== Russian service (1887–1917) ===
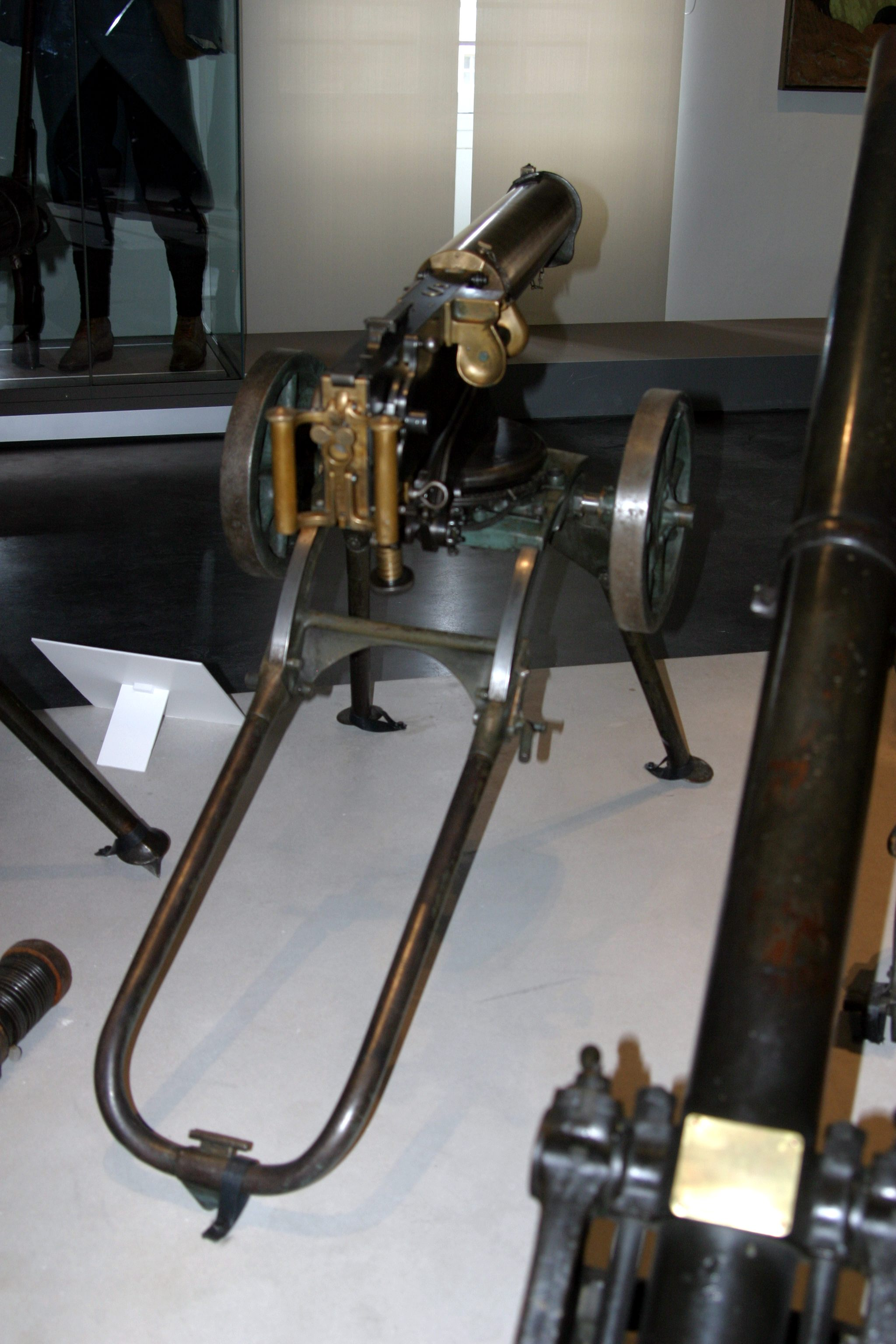
A Russian Maxim M1905 machine gun mounted on a Sokolov M1909 carriage

Hiram Maxim did an introduction tour of the Maxim gun in Russia in 1887, despite the impressive spectacle, only 12 guns were ordered by the Imperial Russian Navy. Many years later, in 1896, the Imperial Russian Navy was re-interested in the Maxim guns, leading to a large order of Maxim guns from Maxim Nordenfelt. Maxim Nordenfelt delivered 179 guns in 1897, and by 1904, the number had increased to almost 300. The Imperial Russian Army purchased 58 Maxim machine guns (chambered in 7.62×54mmR) from DWM in 1899 and contracted with Vickers in 1902 to manufacture the design in Russia. Although some manufacturing started in 1905, mass production did not start until 1910.

During the Russo-Japanese War of 1904–1905, the Russian Army employed the Maxim in combat and placed a rush order for another 450 units from overseas suppliers, which were mostly delivered to front-line troops before the end of the war.

In 1905, Tula Arsenal started manufacturing the Maxim M1905, based on the commercial Vickers-Maxim Model 1901. In 1908, the Sokolov mount (named after its designer, Colonel Alexander A. Sokolov) was introduced, which was equipped with removable gun shield and allowed machine gun crews to pull the weapon and its mount. The Sokolov mount was lighter at around 36–45 kg (79–99 lb), compared to the large-wheeled mount weighing around 170 kg (370 lb).

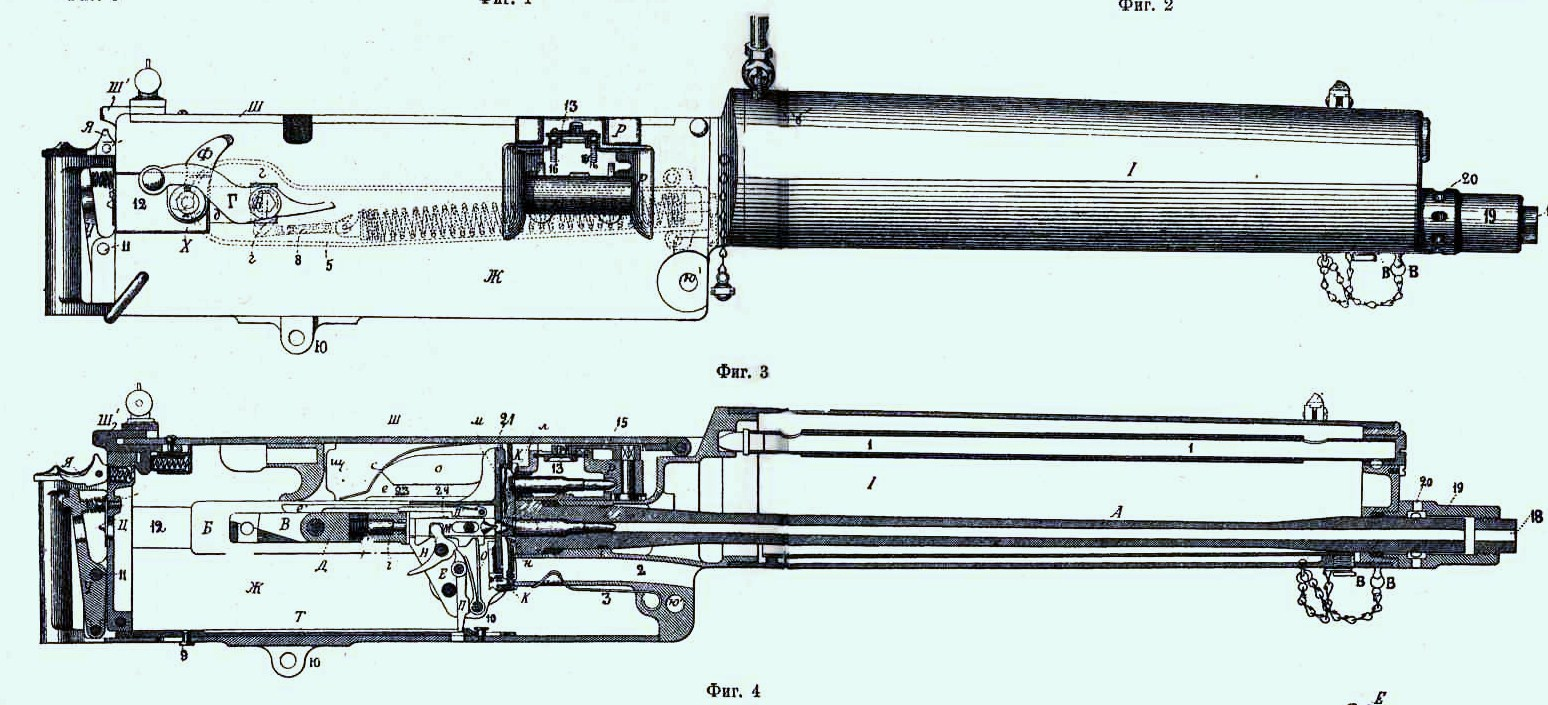
Maxim M1905 body cutaway drawing

The Maxim M1905 was still in use with the Russian military in World War I, but mainly equipped with non-frontline troop. There were plans of upgrading the Maxim M1905 to Maxim M1910 standard, but was dropped when war broke out, so only a small amount of guns were converted.

When the Maxim machine guns first arrived in Iran, Reza Khan had just been appointed as a deputy commander. He was assigned the task of learning how to operate these machine guns under the supervision of Russian experts. It was after mastering this weapon that he earned the nickname "Reza Maxim".

=== Swiss service (1894–1910) ===
Between 1891 and 1894 Switzerland procured 72 heavy machine guns, designated MG 94, from Maxim and Nordenfelt in London. These weapons were issued to fortress troops and mountain troops and were operational until 1944 as spare arms with the Territorial Battalion. The MG 94 was mounted at the front end and at the rear on the knees of the gunner. Two leather padded rings on the left and on the right sides of the breech of the weapon rested on the knees of the machine gunner sitting behind it and permitted sweeping fire. The machine gun MG 94 was chambered for the 7.5x53.5 mm GP 90 cartridge and was later, along other minor technical modifications, adapted for firing the more powerful 7.5x55 mm GP 11 cartridge. Six MG 94s had their water-cooling mantles drilled and cut open, making these guns air-cooled and thus water-free and lighter for use as aircraft machine guns. These six MG 94 air-cooled guns were taken out of service in 1944. At least one MG 94 was converted to an air-cooled model for use on the Häfeli DH-1 reconnaissance aircraft.

In 1899 Switzerland procured 69 heavy machine guns, designated MG 00, mainly from Vickers, Sons & Maxim in London, and later from Deutsche Waffen und Munitionsfabriken (DWM). These guns had tripod mounts designed for cavalry use with a gunner's seat attached to the rear support strut. The machine gun MG 00 was chambered for the 7.5x53.5 mm GP 90 cartridge and was later adapted for firing the more powerful 7.5x55 mm GP 11 cartridge.

=== American use ===
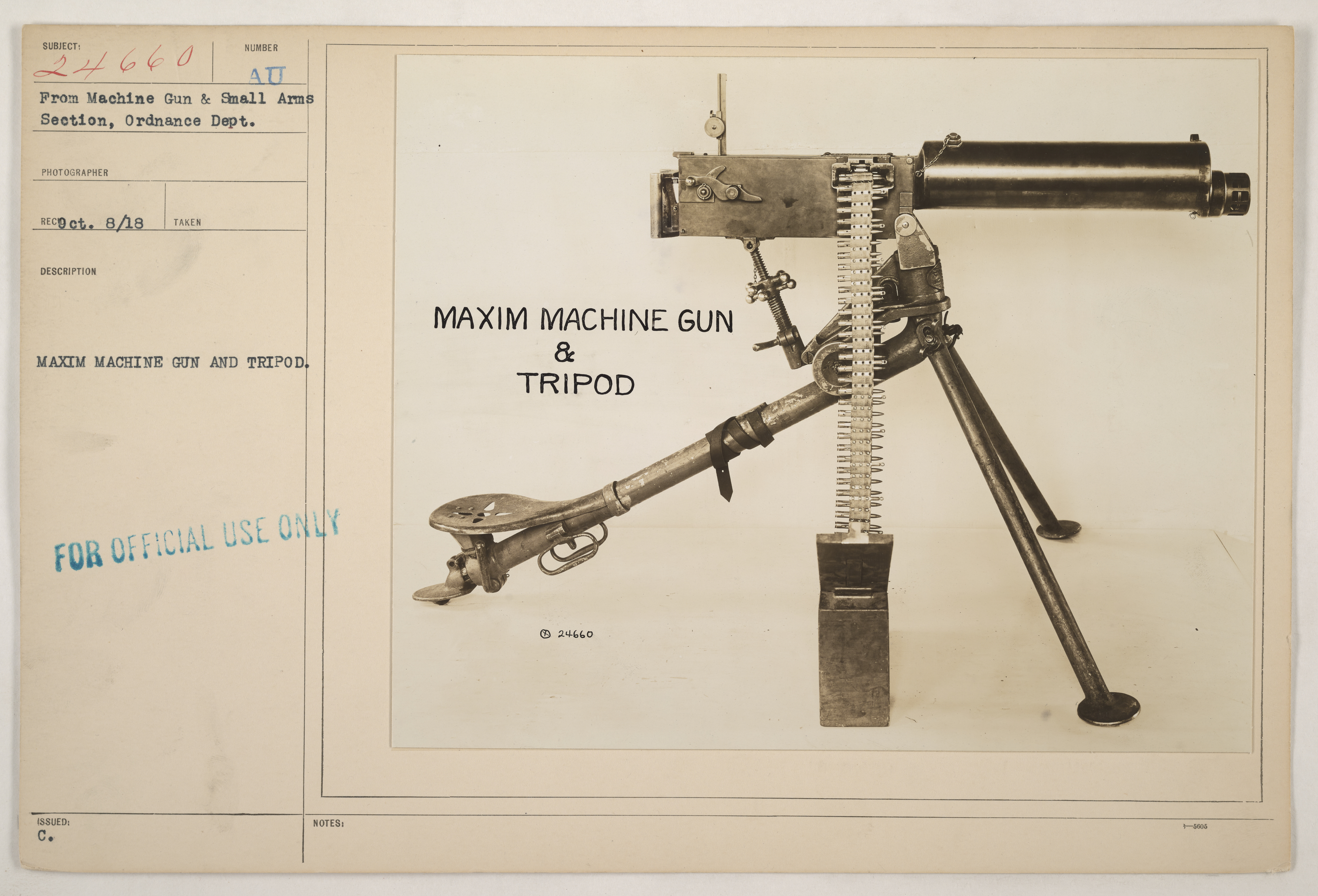
A reference photo of a M1904 Maxim

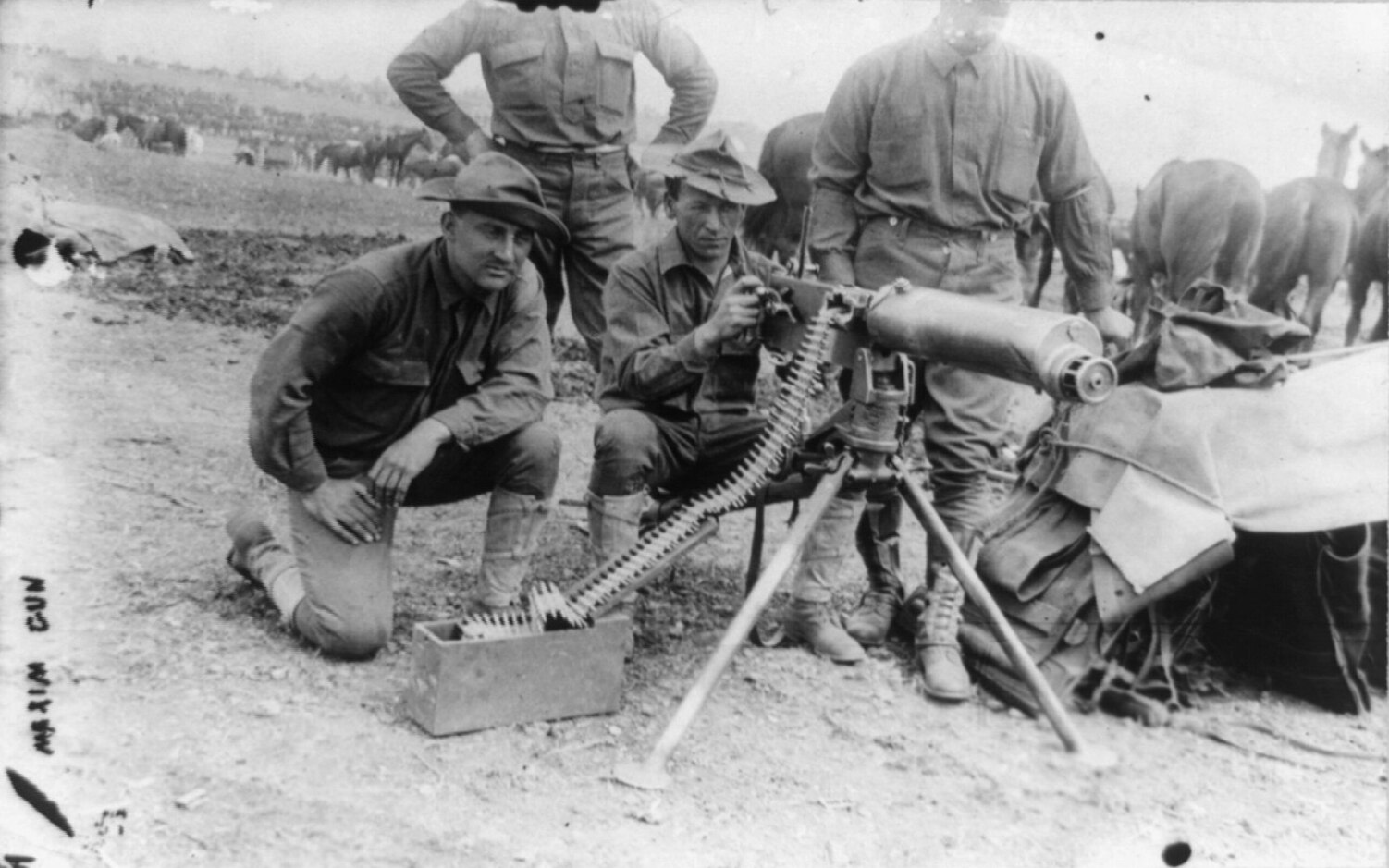
American troops with a M1904 machine gun on maneuvers in Texas, 1911

The United States Army had shown interest in the Maxim machine gun since 1887. Model 1889 and Model 1900 Maxims were used for testing, which lasted for years but not continuously. The gun was finally adopted in 1904 as the Maxim Machine Gun, Caliber .30, Model of 1904 as the first rifle-caliber heavy machine gun for standard service in the U.S. Army. The design was characteristic for its visually distinctive cage-like muzzle recoil booster designed by Trevor Dawson and J. Ramsay of Vickers.

The first 50 guns and tripods were made by Vickers, Sons & Maxim in the U.K. chambered for .30-03. Colt was selected to produce it domestically, but challenges with schematics and specifications delayed its introduction. By the time Colt began production in 1908 (which was also the last year orders were placed for the guns), a total of 90 M1904s were made by Vickers. Colt made their machine guns for the new .30-06 caliber, and the ones made by Vickers were re-chambered for the new round. A total of 287 M1904 Maxims were manufactured. The U.S. procured other machine guns after M1904 production ended, including the M1909 Benét–Mercié, the Colt–Vickers M1915, and the Browning M1917.

M1904 Maxims were issued to infantry companies and cavalry. Each company had four guns with associated tripods, ammunition, and 20 mules to transport the heavy guns. The M1904 was deployed in operations in the Philippines, Hawaii, Mexico, and Central and South America, but never saw much combat use. During World War I, it remained in the U.S. for training.

=== World War I (1914–1918) ===
By World War I, many armies had moved on to improved machine guns. The British Vickers machine gun was an improved and redesigned Maxim, introduced into the British Army in 1912 and remaining in service until 1968. Production took place at Erith in Kent, and some models were fitted to early biplanes also fabricated there. The German Army's Maschinengewehr 08 and the Russian Pulemyot Maxim were both more or less direct copies of the Maxim.

It also saw use during the Russian Civil War, which followed the Revolution in 1917. A picture of the period depicts a Maxim gun mounted on a tachanka, a horse-drawn carriage, along with the gunner, firing backwards at a pursuing White Army regiment. Anarchists attribute this mobile setup to Nestor Makhno.

=== Russo-Ukrainian War ===
The Maxim, in the form of the PM M1910 chambered in 7.62×54mmR, has been used by both sides of the Russo-Ukrainian War of 2022. Many Maxim guns were retrofitted to suit the nature of modern warfare, including its installation on technicals and the mounting of red dot sights. At least one documented Maxim gun used by the Ukrainian Ground Forces in the Battle of Bakhmut still had its original iron wheels with no visible modifications. A Ukrainian soldier told BBC News in March 2023: "It only works when there is a massive attack going on ... then it really works. So we use it every week".

On September 7, 2025, over Kyiv, a Maxim shot down a Kh-69 missile, by a volunteer with the call sign "Hrek".

== Extra Light Rifle Calibre Maxim ==
Extra Light Rifle Calibre Maxim
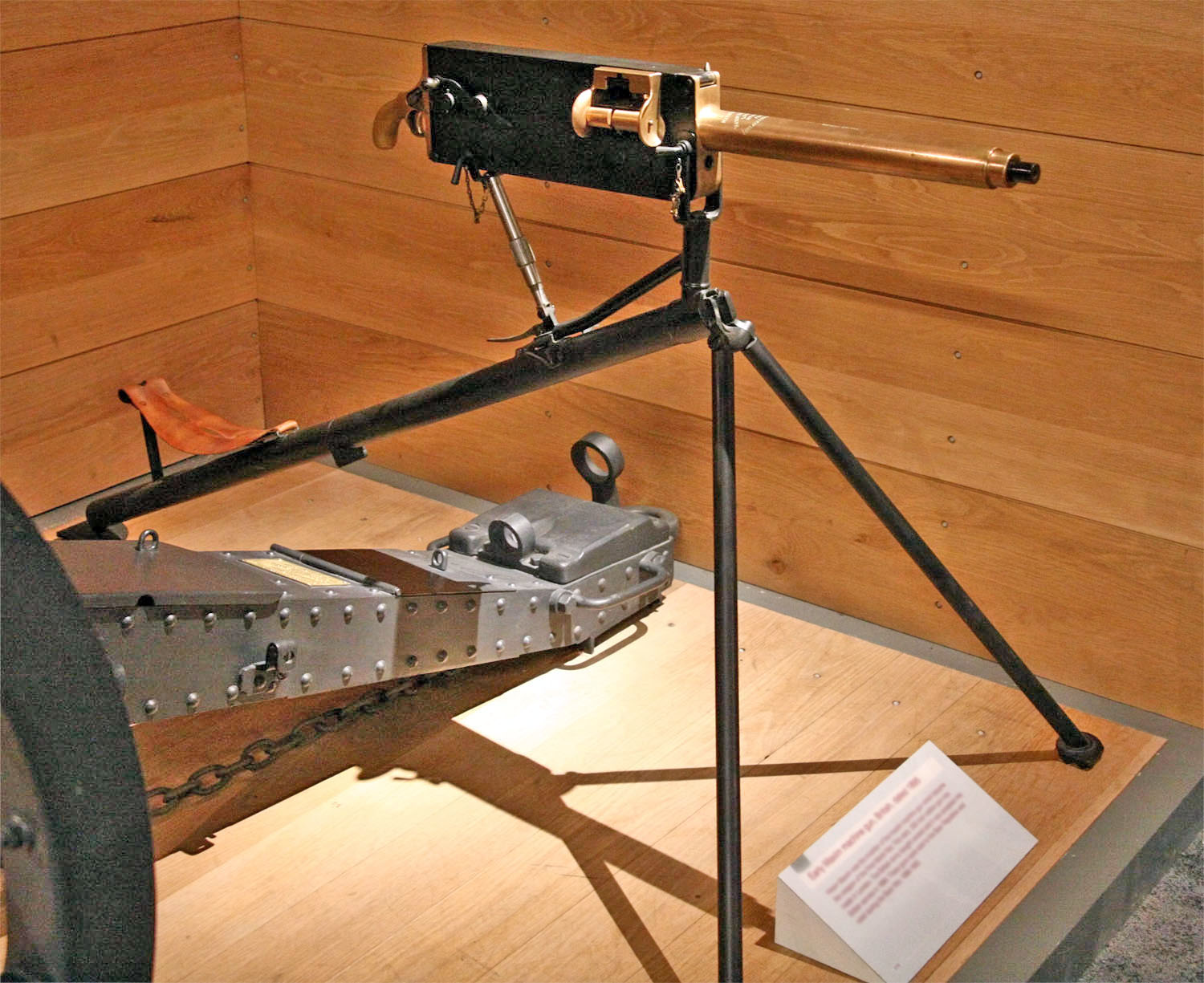
- Air-cooled, Extra Light Maxim M1895.
- Type: Medium machine gun
- Place of origin: United Kingdom

Service history
- In service: 1895–1900s

Production history
- Designer: Sir Hiram Stevens Maxim
- Designed: 1895
- Manufacturer: Vickers, Sons & Maxim
- No. built: 135

Specifications
- Mass: 20.2 kg (44.53 lb) (Complete Gun): Gun body: 12.2 kg (26.9 lb); Tripod: 8 kg (17.64 lb)
- Crew: 1
- Cartridge: .303 British
- Action: Recoil-operated
- Rate of fire: 400 rounds/min
- Muzzle velocity: 744 m/s (2,440 ft/s)
- Feed system: 250-round canvas belt
- Sights: Iron sights

=== Background ===
In 1890, another American inventor, John Browning, designed a lighter and more portable, air-cooled, gas operated machine gun and offered it to the Colt's Manufacturing Company. The gun itself weighed only 40 pounds (18 kg), but it had to be mounted on a tripod of similar weight. It entered mass production as the Colt–Browning M1895 (Potato Digger), and was adopted by the US Navy in 1895.

In 1895, in response to the interest shown in the Colt–Browning M1895 in the U.S. machine gun trials, Hiram Maxim introduced his own air-cooled Extra Light gun. (Note: Weighing only 27 lb (12.25 kg) alone and 44.5 lb (20.18 kg) complete with tripod.) It was the first air-cooled Maxim gun, and the first with the mainspring inside the receiver casing. At the time, it was the lightest machine gun in the world and the only complete machine gun that could be carried by one man.

Maxim hoped that cavalry units would appreciate the Extra Light gun for "hit and run" raids, for its light weight. Indeed, the U.S. trials Board commented quite favorably on its portability. However, as the air-cooling mechanics was not very well understood at the time, the thick brass jacket that covered the barrel had only four cooling holes in its bottom, and the gun overheated very quickly. Maxim himself estimated that no more than 400 rounds could be fired from it at one time, before a pause for cooling had to be made.

=== Reception ===
However, despite an extensive promotional campaign conducted by Hiram Maxim himself, the 1895 Extra Light gun was a commercial failure and only 135 were built, many of these being sold out singly or in pairs for tests in various countries.

== Variants / Derivatives ==
=== Water-cooled guns ===
- Vickers machine gun: earlier Maxims had been chambered for earlier British service cartridges, but the Vickers was produced for export available in most of the different calibres and cartridges used by countries around the world, and including a large caliber (.50 inch) as used on Royal Navy warships. The machine gun was 20 pounds (9 kg) lighter and had been tested by the Army in 1909.
- Maschinengewehr 01, made by Deutsche Waffen und Munitionsfabriken (DWM)
- MG 08 derived from MG 01
  - Its export version DWM 1909 commercial, featuring the naval tripod mount of the MG 08 instead of the sled
  - German indigenous derivatives (e.g., MG 08/15)
  - Type 24 heavy machine gun, Chinese variant of DWM 1909

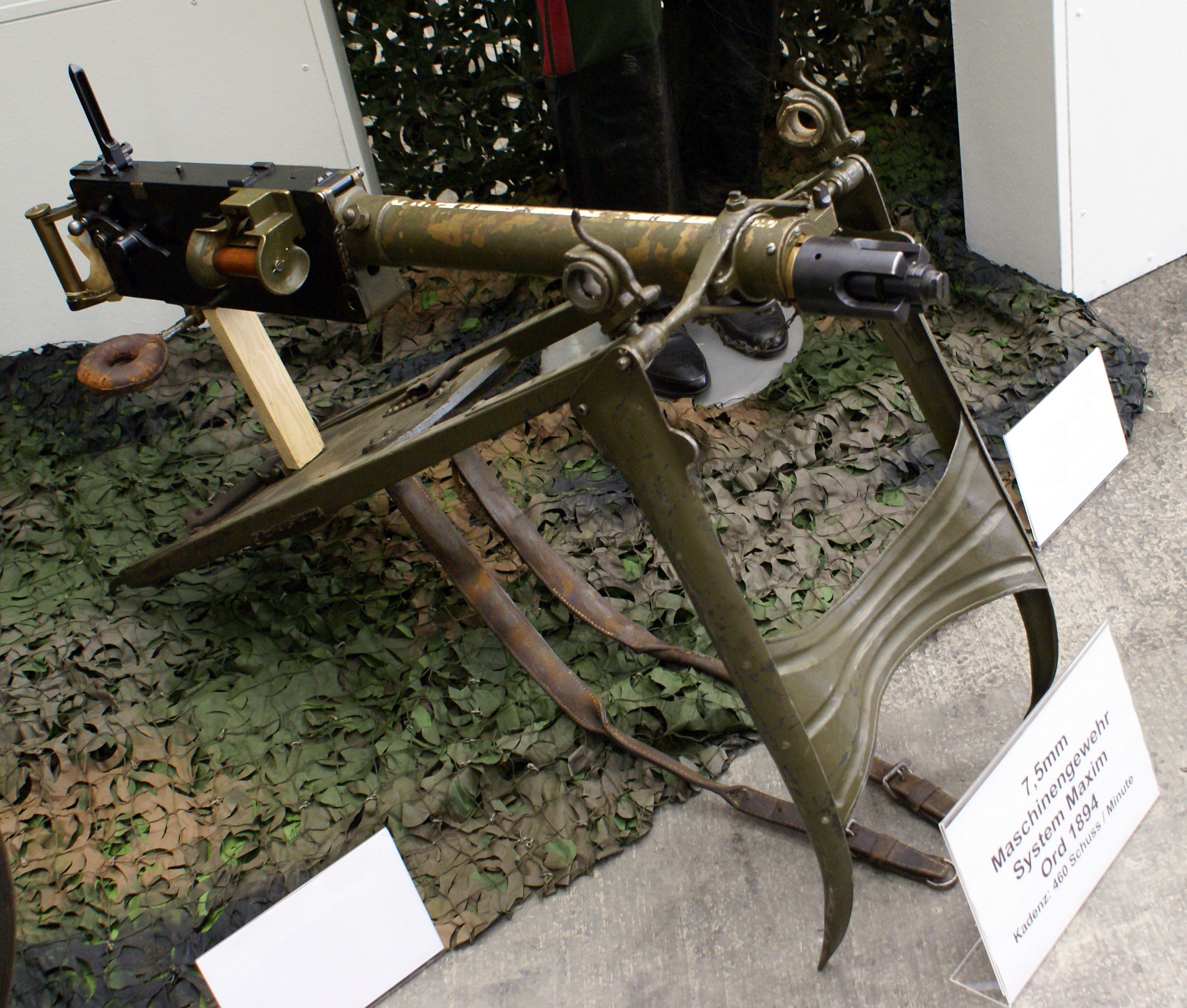
Swiss Maschinengewehr System Maxim Ord 1894 chambered in the 7.5 mm GP11 round

- Maschinengewehr Modell 1911, Swiss variant of the DWM 1909 made by Waffenfabrik Bern
- Russian/Soviet Pulemyot Maxima obr. 1910
- Finnish Maxim M09/21 and Maxim M/32-33
- American M1904
- Argentine Maxim Model 1895

=== Air-cooled guns ===
- Extra Light Rifle Calibre Maxim
- Maxim–Tokarev and PV-1 machine gun

=== Other guns ===
- Maxim five-barrel machine gun (Fed from overhead inserted magazines and later belt-fed).
- MG 18 TuF Anti-tank & Anti-aircraft gun
- QF 1-pounder pom-pom
- QF 2-pounder naval gun

== Manufacturers ==
Main manufacturers
Maxim Nordenfelt (1888–1897)
Vickers, Sons & Maxim (1897–1911)
Vickers Limited (1911–1927)
Vickers-Armstrongs (1927–1940s)
Other manufacturers
Deutsche Waffen und Munitionsfabriken (1896–1918)
Tula Arsenal
Tikkakoski (1924–1944)
Valtion Kivääritehdas (1933–1944)
Waffenfabrik Bern (1911–1946)

== Users ==
- Albania
- Argentina
- Belgium
  - Congo Free State – Used by Force Publique
- Bolivia
- Brazil
- Bulgaria
- Canada
- Costa Rica
- China (ROC)
- China (CSR)
- China (PRC)
- Chile – Adopted at some point in the early 20th century as part of the prusianization efforts of the Chilean army organized by Emil Körner. Historical photos suggest its use as early as 1904.
- Estonia

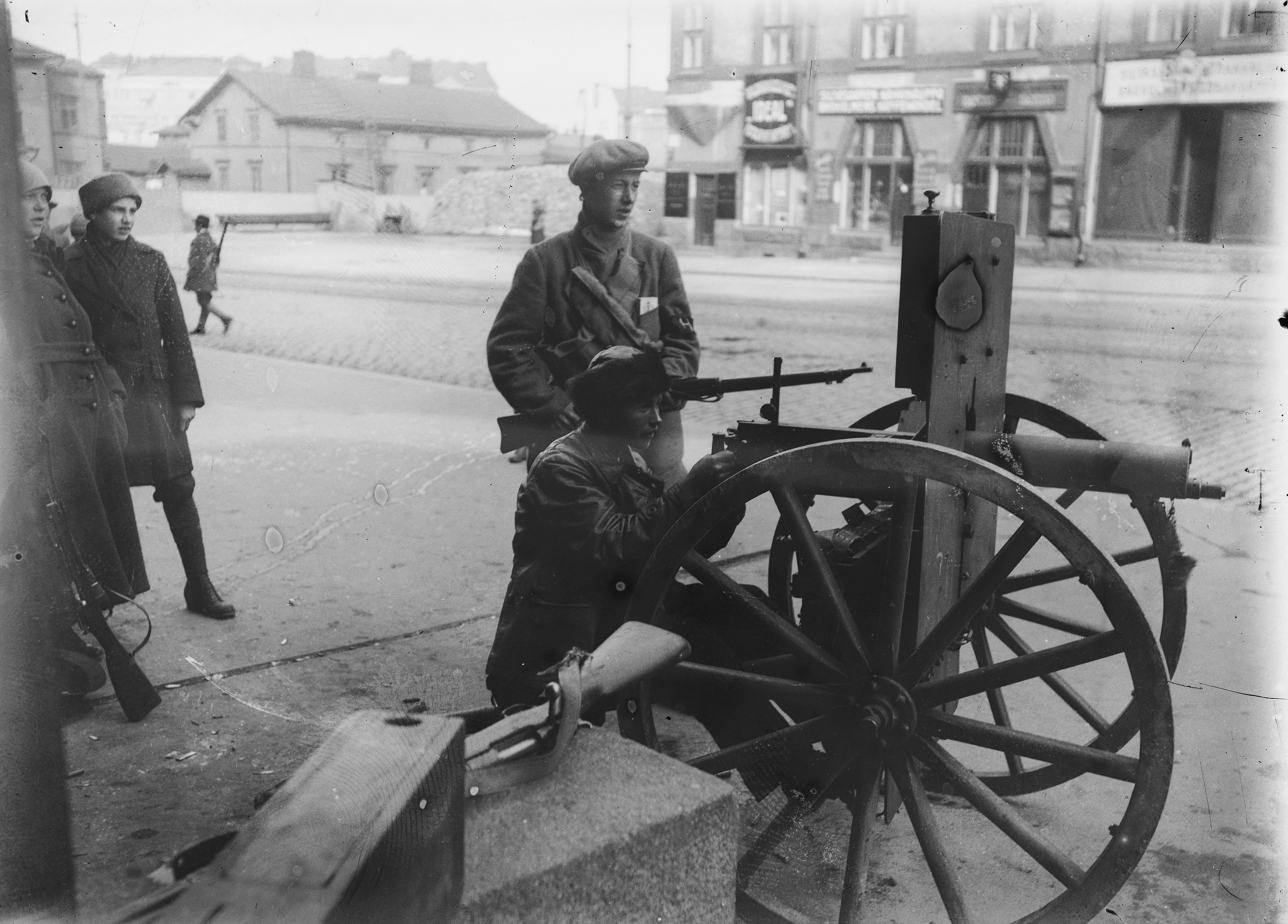
Red Guard fighters with Maxim machine gun during the Battle of Helsinki in the Finnish Civil War

- Finland – Small numbers were used by both sides in the Finnish Civil War. Maxim M/09-21 had a significant role as a substitute for artillery in the Winter War and the Continuation War.
- France
  - Vichy France
- German Empire
- Germany
- Iran
- Italy – The Italian Navy was the first to adopt the Maxim machine gun in Italy as Maxim Mod. 1888 chambered for the 10.35x47 mm R cartridge. In 1906 it was also officially adopted by the Italian Army chambered in 6.5 Carcano as Maxim Mod. 1906, followed by the Maxim Mod. 1908 and the Maxim Mod. 1909, the latter adopted by the Italian Navy.
- Japan — In 1895, the Imperial Japanese Army purchased a number of Maxims and tested them during the 1895 invasion of Taiwan but later decided to standardize on the Hotchkiss machine gun.
- Montenegro – By 1912, the army had 12 Maxims; 50 more were ordered during the Balkan wars but it is not known if they arrived in time.
- Romania
- Serbia, by the Royal Serbian Army.
- Korea
- Latvia (1918–1940, .303 and other versions)
- Mexico
- Nicaragua – Used in the Battle of Namasique against the forces of Honduran General Manuel Bonilla in 1907.
- New Zealand – Six .577/450 Maxim guns mounted on Field Carriages Mk I were purchased in 1896; they were converted to .303 British after 1899. Two of these took part in the Dog Tax War. 29 .303 caliber guns were purchased from Vickers Sons & Maxim in 1901 on Dundonald Galloping Carriages. In 1910, 36 guns were ordered on Mk IV tripods with pack saddlery and stores but only arrived in 1913. When the tripods arrived the carriages were scrapped. However initially due to the delay in converting the guns to tripod mounting only one gun was issued to each of the 29 regiments. The New Zealand Mounted Rifles formed a Maxim Gun Battery with British-supplied guns during the Boer War. New Zealand Forces entered WWI with older Maxim machineguns and 36 new ones.
- North Korea
- Ottoman Empire
- Persia
- Paraguay
- Philippines
- Poland
- Portugal – Metralhadora Pesada Maxim m/906; adopted by the Portuguese Army in 1906, chambered for the 6.5×58mm Vergueiro cartridge
- Qajar Dynasty – Had a battery of four guns in the 1890s. Also used during the Constitutional Revolution
- Qing Dynasty
- Romania – Romanian-made 6.5 mm version, at least 8–12 were produced and were used by the Romanian Danube Flotilla during World War I.
- Russia
- Soviet Union
- Spain – Adopted in 1893, using 7×57mm Mauser Spanish cartridge.
- Spain (2^{nd} Republic) – M1910 7.62×54mmR Maxim provided by the Soviet Union.
- Switzerland
- Ukraine – Maxim M1910 used during the Russo-Ukrainian War.
- United Kingdom
- United States

== Conflicts ==
19th century
Mahdist War (1881–1899) (Note: The Extra Light Rifle Calibre Maxim was also used in this conflict.)
Emin Pasha Relief Expedition (1887–1889)
Yoni Expedition (1887)
Samoan Civil War (1886–1894)
Abushiri Revolt
Jebu War
- Buganda Civil Wars (1800s)
  - Conflict between Protestants and Catholic Baganda (1892)
- Matabele Wars
  - 1^{st} Matabele War (1893–1894)
  - 2^{nd} Matabele War
1^{st} Sino-Japanese War (1894–1895)
Chitral Expedition
Japanese invasion of Taiwan (1895)
4^{th} Anglo-Ashanti War (1895–1896)
Jameson Raid
Philippine Revolution
Benin Expedition (1897)
Spanish–American War (1898)
Ashanti Uprising (1900)
19th–20th century
Bafut Wars (1889; 1891; 1901–1907)
Adamawa Wars (1899–1907)
Philippine–American War (1899–1902)
Dervish State (1899–1920)
2^{nd} Boer War (1899–1902)
Boxer Rebellion (1899–1901)
20th century

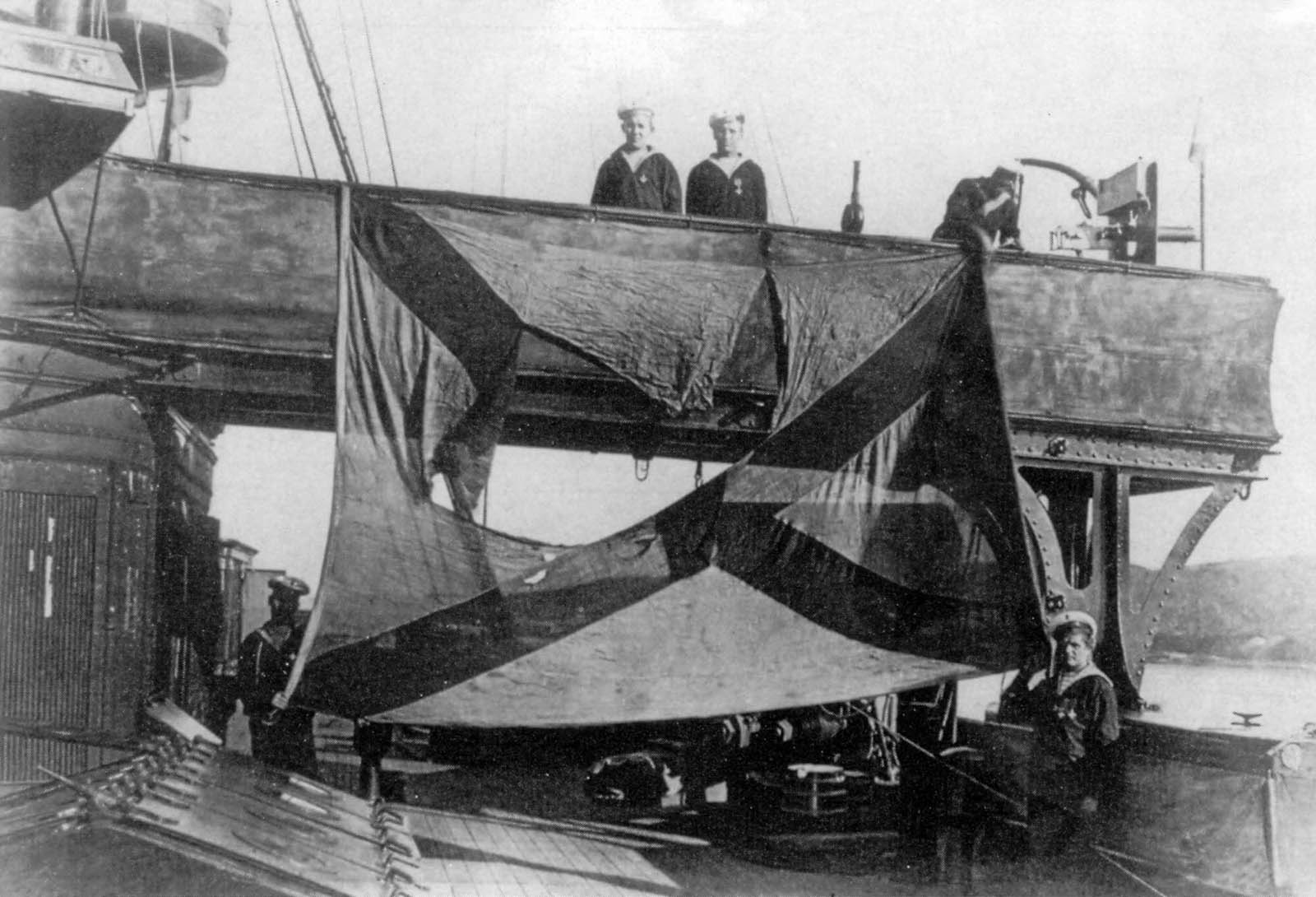
A naval Russian Maxim (on the top right) mounted on the Imperial Russian armoured cruiser Gromoboi after Battle off Ulsan, August 1904

Anglo-Aro War (1901–1902)
British expedition to Tibet (1903–1904)
Russo-Japanese War (1904–1905)
- German colonial conflicts
  - Herero Wars (1904–1908)
  - Maji Maji Rebellion (1905–1907)
  - Sokehs Rebellion (1910–1911)
Persian Constitutional Revolution (1905–1911)
- Spanish-Moroccan colonial conflicts
  - 2^{nd} Melillan campaign (1909)
  - Rif War (1921–1926)
- Honduran Conflicts (1907–1911)
  - Honduran Coup (1907) (Note: Coup forces were liberal Honduran exiles in Nicaragua, supported by Nicaragua's president José Santos Zelaya along with elements of the Nicaraguan army.)
    - Battle of Namasique
Mexican Revolution (1910–1920)
Italo-Turkish War (1911-1912)
Xinhai Revolution (1911–1912)
Balkan Wars (1912–1913)
Contestado War
World War I (1914–1918)
- Aftermath of World War I (1917–1923) (Note: Including the revolutions of 1917–1923)
  - Russian Civil War (1917–1922)
  - Finnish Civil War (1918)
  - German Revolution (1918–1919)
    - January Uprising (1919)
  - Estonian War of Independence (1918–1920)
  - Polish–Soviet War (1919–1921)
  - Turkish War of Independence (1919–1922)
Paraguayan Civil War (1922–1923)
Irish Civil War (1922–1923)
Brazilian Civil War (1932)
Chaco War (1932–1935)
- Chinese Civil War
  - 1^{st} Phase (1927–1936)
  - 2^{nd} Phase (1945–1949)
Spanish Civil War (1936–1939)
2^{nd} Sino-Japanese War (1937–1945)
- World War II (1939–1945)
  - Winter War (1939–1940)
  - Continuation War (1941–1944)
  - Lapland War (1944–1945)
Indonesian War of Independence (1945–1949)
Greek Civil War (1946–1949)
Costa Rican Civil War (1948)
- Indochina Wars
  - 1^{st} Indochina War (1946–1954)
  - 2^{nd} Indochina War (1955–1975)
Indo-Pakistani War (1947–1948)
Arab–Israeli War (1948–1949)
Malayan Emergency (1948–1960)
Korean War (1950–1953)
Algerian War (1954–1962)
Cypriot intercommunal violence (1955–1974)
Congo Crisis (1960–1965)
Aden Emergency (1963–1967)
South African Border War (1966–1990)
Bangladesh War of Independence (1971)
JVP Insurrection (1971)
21st century
Syrian Civil War
- Russo-Ukrainian War
  - War in Donbas

== Gallery ==
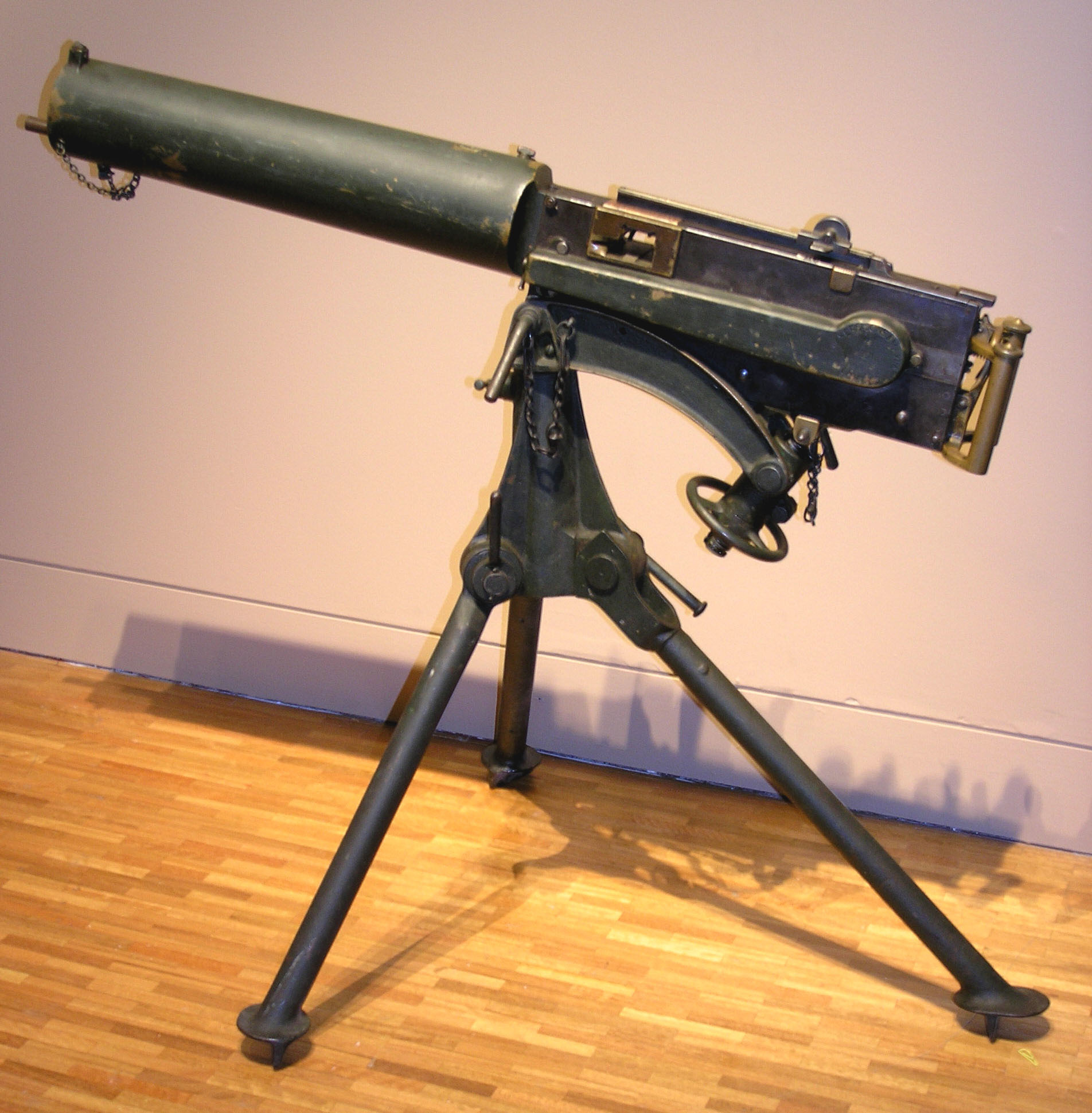
Vickers–Maxim Mk I (.303 inch calibre), used in Anglo–Boer War and World War I (c. 1901)

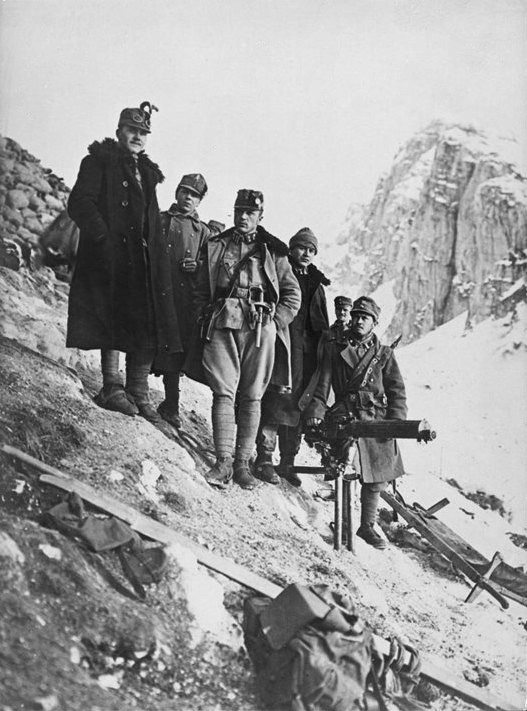
Austro-Hungarian soldiers with a trophy Maxim machine gun in the High Alps, c. 1916

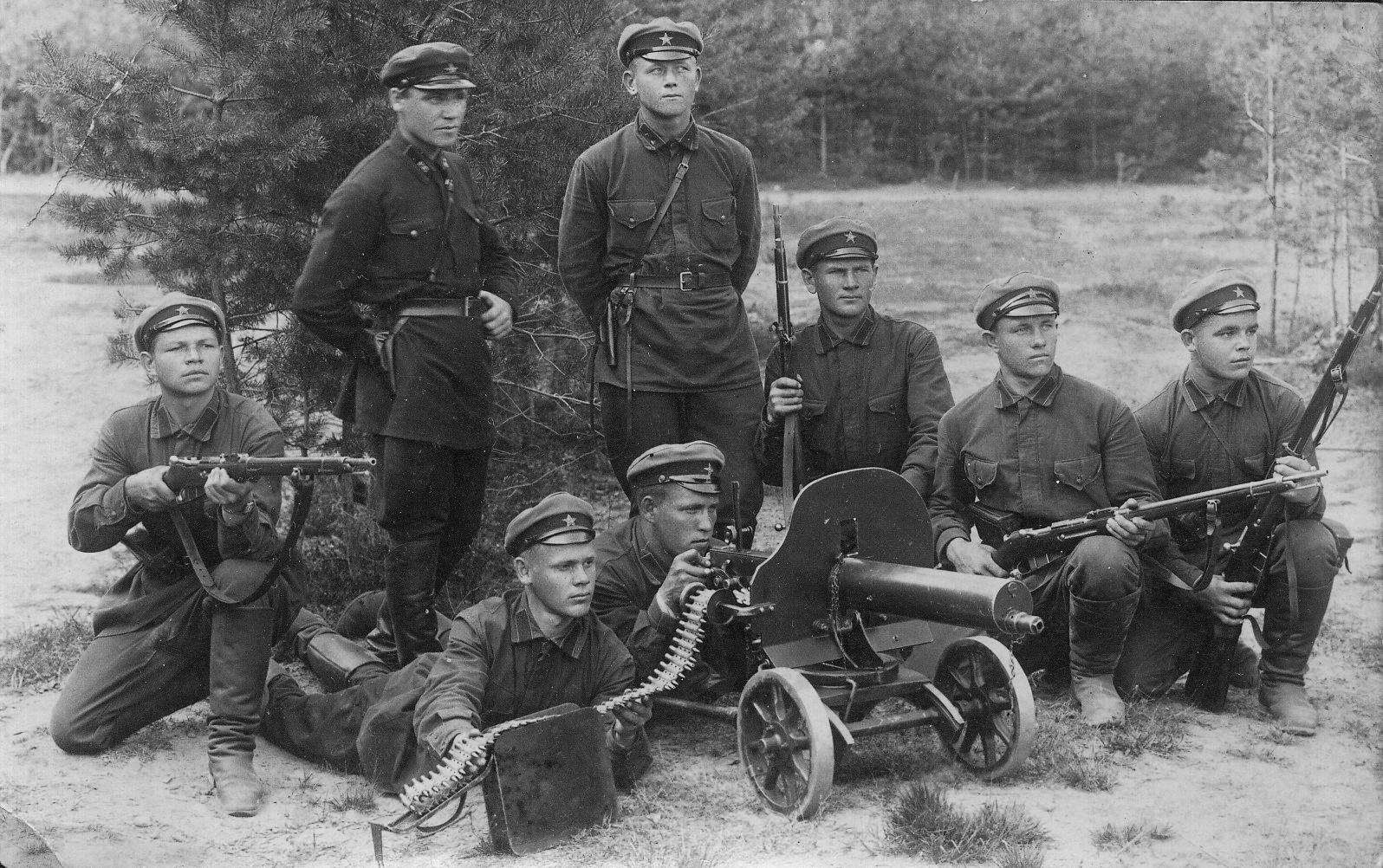
Red Army soldiers with a Maxim machine gun, c. 1930

== See also ==
=== Weapons of comparable role, performance and era ===
- Caldwell machine gun
- Fittipaldi machine gun
- Hotchkiss machine gun
- Kjellman machine gun
- M1917 Browning machine gun
- Nordenfelt gun
- Perino Model 1908
- QF 1-pounder pom-pom
- St. Étienne Mle 1907
