= 42-line fortress and siege gun Pattern of 1877 =

Russian siege gun

42-line siege gun M1877
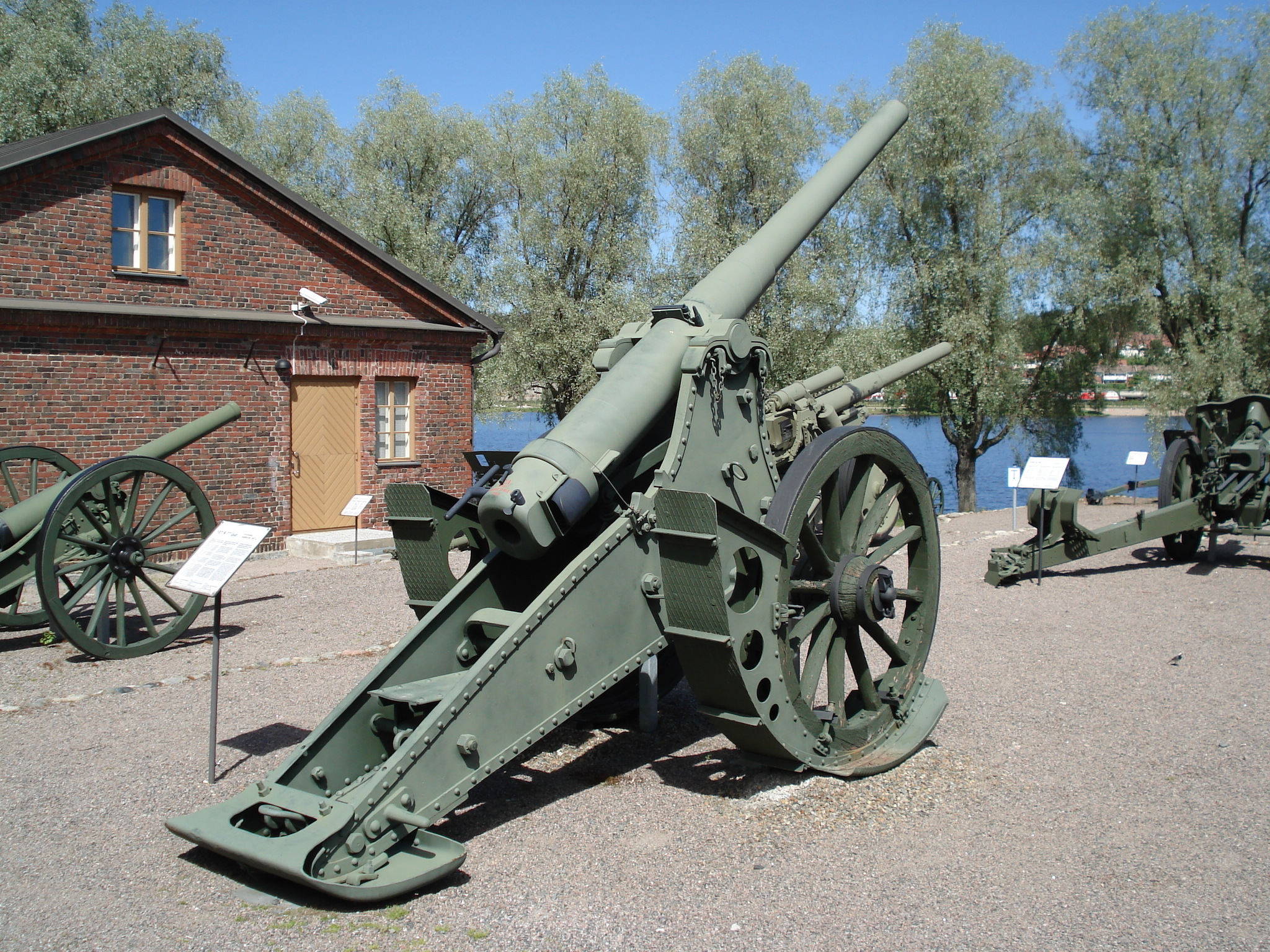
- M1877 in Hämeenlinna Artillery Museum.
- Type: siege gun
- Place of origin: German Empire; Russian Empire

Production history
- Designer: Krupp
- Produced: 1877–1903

Specifications
- Mass: 2,500 kg (5,500 lbs)
- Barrel length: L/35 : 35 calibres 12.30 ft (3.75 m)
- Caliber: 4.2 inch (106.7 mm)
- Breech: Horizontal sliding-block
- Carriage: wheeled siege carriage, box trail
- Muzzle velocity: 543 m/s (1,781 ft/s)
- Maximum firing range: 9,600 m (10,500 yds)

42-line fortress and siege gun M1877 (Russian: 42-линейная крепостная и осадная пушка образца 1877 года) was a siege gun used by the Russian Imperial Army in late 19th and early 20th centuries. The word "line" in the designation refers to a measurement unit which equals 0.1 inch. The "model year" was not the year when the weapon was designed or standardized, but the year when a new rifling system was adopted.

== History ==
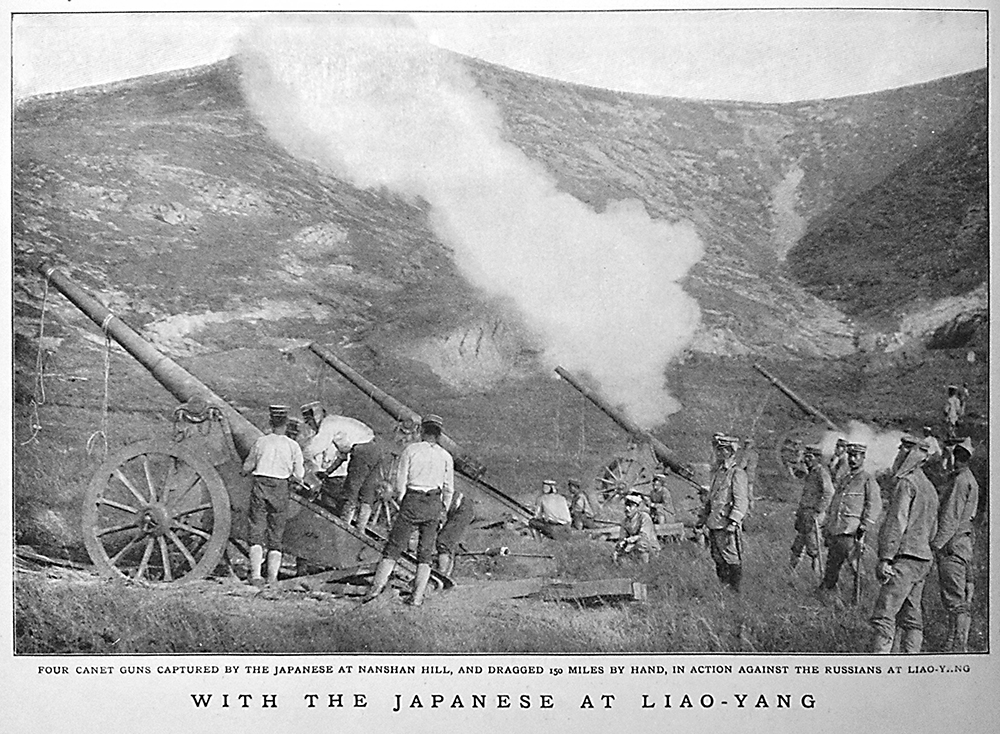
Captured 42-line siege guns, captured by the Japanese at the battle of Nanshan, in action against the Russians at the battle of Liaoyang, 1904.

The gun was initially developed by the German arms manufacturer Krupp and was based on an earlier 105 mm piece and would have a typical Krupp horizontal sliding-block breech block. The 105 mm weapon was demonstrated to a group of Russian Army officers along with a 120 mm design. The delegation liked the 105 mm weapon, but wanted Krupp to change the caliber to a traditional Russian caliber of "42 lines" (106.7 mm). Later the weapon entered production in Russia; it remained in production until 1903.

The 42-line siege gun M1877 could fire high explosive (HE) or shrapnel shells of 15.6 kg (34.3 lbs) weight at a distance of 9.6 km (6 miles).

Notice in the image on right top of page the equipment around wheels used to reduce recoil.

== Employment ==
The gun saw action in the Russo-Japanese War like in the defense of the Nanshan Hill during the battle of Nanshan. The Japanese Army successfully attacked the hill and captured several 42-line siege guns. Due to the lack of heavy artillery the Japanese took the guns in service during the rest of the conflict.

Montenegro used a few guns of this type up to World War I and Finland used weapons of this type until the World War II Era. Many of the 42-line siege guns were captured by the Imperial German Army and reissued to nine Landwehr Foot Artillery Battalions, equipping 22 Batteries.

The 42-line siege gun M1877 should not be confused with the 42-line field gun M1877, a field gun version which had a shorter barrel and lower muzzle velocity.

== Literature ==
- Shirokorad A. B. - Encyclopedia of the Soviet Artillery - Mn. Harvest, 2000 (Широкорад А. Б. Энциклопедия отечественной артиллерии. — Мн.: Харвест, 2000., ISBN 985-433-703-0)
