= PM M1910 =

Pulyemyot Maksima obr. 1910
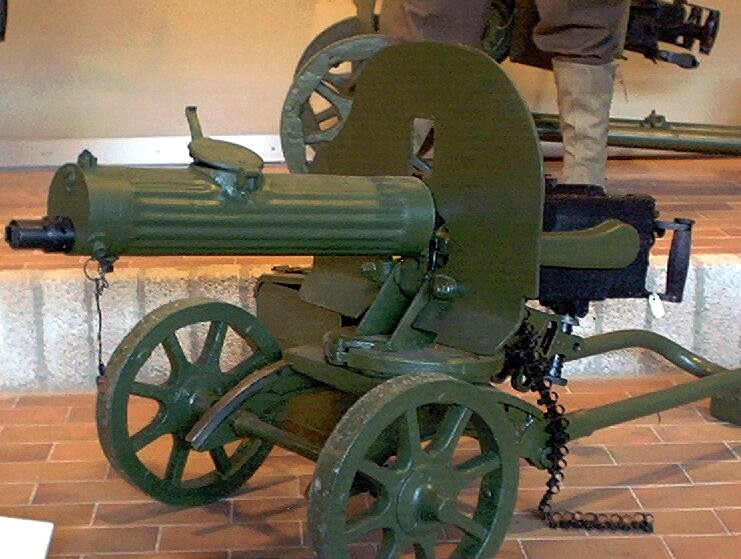
- PM M1910/30
- Type: Heavy machine gun
- Place of origin: Russian Empire

Service history
- In service: 1910–present
- Used by: See § Users
- Wars: See § Conflicts

Production history
- Designed: 1909–1910
- Manufacturer: Tula Arsenal
- Developed from: Maksima obr. 1905
- Produced: 1910–1939; 1941–1945
- No. built: At least 176,000; Up to 600,000
- Variants: See § Variants

Specifications
- Mass: Gun body: 23.8 kg (52.47 lb); On wheeled mount: 62.66 kg (138.14 lb)
- Length: 1,067 mm (42.01 in)
- Barrel length: 721 mm (28.39 in)
- Cartridge: 7.62×54mmR
- Caliber: 7.62 mm
- Action: Short recoil, toggle locked
- Rate of fire: 600 round/min
- Muzzle velocity: 740 m/s (2,400 ft/s)
- Effective firing range: 2,700 m (2,950 yd)
- Maximum firing range: 5,000 m (5,470 yd)
- Feed system: 250-round belt

The Pulyemyot Maksima M1910 (Russian: Пулемёт Максима образца 1910 года, romanized: Pulemyot Maksima obraztsa 1910 goda, lit. 'Maxim machine gun model 1910'), or PM M1910, is a heavy machine gun based on the Maxim gun, that was used by the Imperial Russian Army, Navy and Air Service during World War I, then by the Red, White and Green armies during the Russian Civil War, and later by the Soviet Armed Forces during World War II. Later the gun saw service in the Korean War, the Vietnam War and the Russo-Ukrainian war.

== Background ==
The Imperial Russian Army adopted machine guns in the late 19th century. They were initially treated as inferior artillery pieces (the Imperial Russian Army's Artillery Administration was the main buyer of weapons for the government), being relegated mostly on fortresses, however they quickly proved their worth during the Russo-Turkish War (1877–1878) and the Russo-Japanese War. In the latter, the Maxim gun (chosen by the Artillery Administration over the French Hotchkiss) inflicted heavy casualties on the Japanese. As result, the Russians would primarily use the PM M1910 during World War I.

== Description ==
=== Overview ===
The first Russian-produced Maxims (the PM M1905) were a direct copy of the Vickers 'New Light Model' of 1906. These were mounted on large-wheeled carriages, had a bronze water jacket, and weighted 35.5 kg (78 lb) with the water jacket filled. The PM M1910 was considerably lighter using a steel water jacket, reducing weight to 24.5 kg (54 lb). Other improvements included the addition of a muzzle brake, an improved locking mechanism and a smaller wheeled mounting. In 1930, the Soviets modified the design to improve performance and ease manufacturing. Improvements include a modified firing mechanism to allow the gunner to fire with one hand, a simplified and improved rear sight, and a drainage valve on the water jacket; an optical sight for indirect fire, allowing the use of a new heavy bullet version of the 7.62×54mmR cartridge was also added to the PM 1910/30, which remained largely unchanged until 1941, when the water jacket filler cap was enlarged, allowing soldiers to fill it up with handfuls of snow and ice during the winter months (a feature copied from the Finnish Maxim M/32-33 encountered during the Winter War), while the feeding mechanism was altered to accept either canvas or metallic ammunition belts, During WWII, the design was further simplified to speed up production, including the use of feed blocks made of silumin and the removal of the optical sights.

While the M1910 was a sound design, its manufacture was slow, requiring skilled workers and specialized machinery; another problem was that soldiers had to carry water to cool down the barrel in the battlefield, leading to demands for an air-cooled weapon. The weight of the Maxim and its mounting made difficult for machine gun squads to keep up with advancing friendly forces, though the water-cooled barrel allows gunners to provide prolonged fire support.

=== Action ===
This gun derives its operating energy from short recoil with an assist from a muzzle booster. After recoiling 1.9 cm (3/4 in), (Note: Ian V. Hogg uses the term "three-quarters of a turn" instead of 3/4 of an inch.) the bolt is unlocked; then the recoiling forces and remaining high residual pressure in the chamber accelerate the bolt assembly to the rear. The recoil movement causes a cam lever action that moves the entire feed block slide to the right. The feed pawls move over to engage the incoming round in the belt, which is being held in position by the bottom belt-holding pawl, and at the same time compress the barrel return spring. Counter-recoil movement of the barrel and its extension returns the feed block slide to the left, indexing the incoming round into position against the cartridge stops for engagement by the sliding T-slot. The backward movement of the bolt assembly is stopped by tension applied by the fusee spring. Charging is accomplished manually with a crank arrangement located on the right side of the piece.

=== Mounting ===
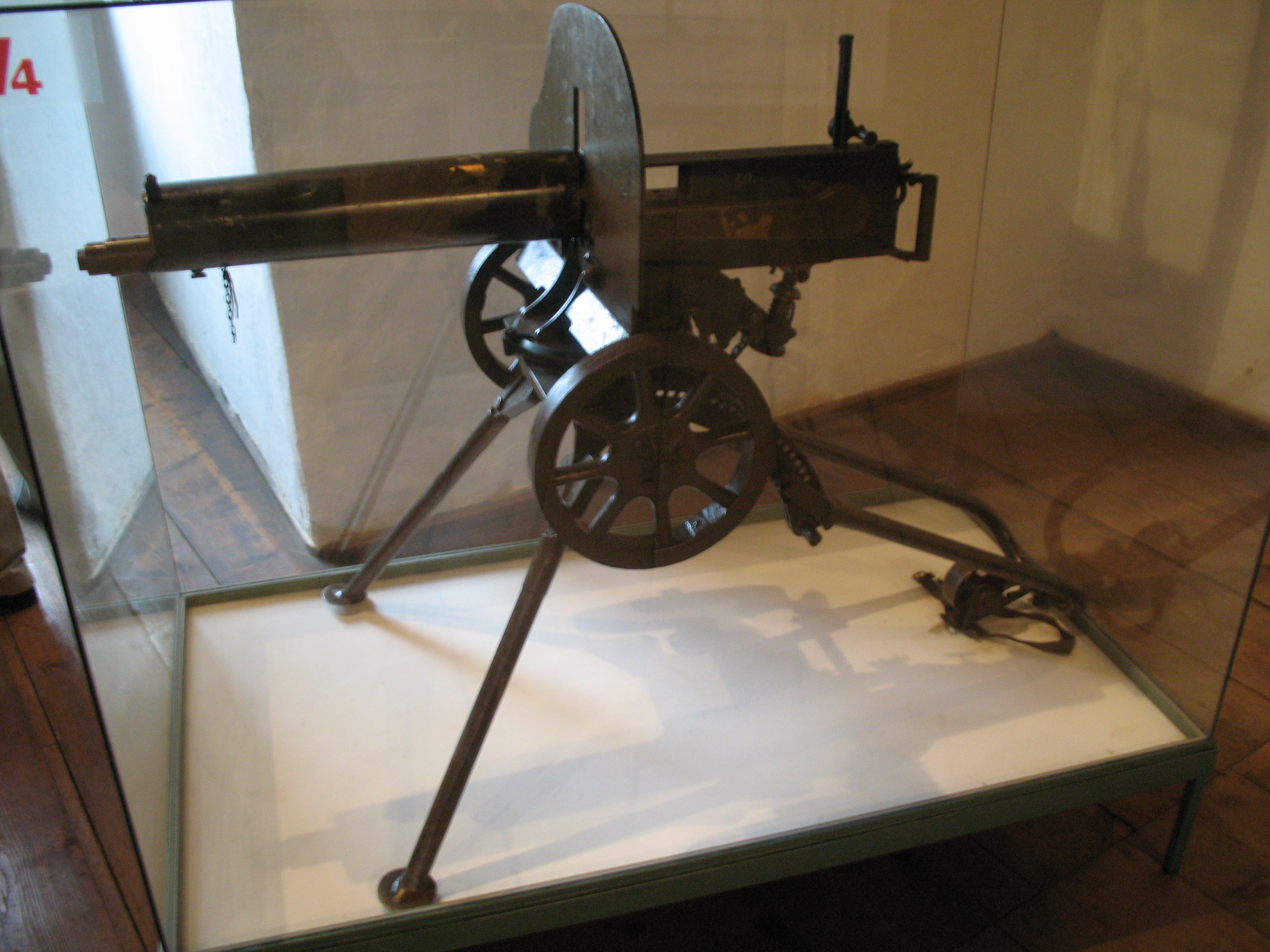
A M1910 with a raised Sokolov mounting

The PM M1910 initially used a wheeled mounting designed by Aleksandr Alekseevich Sokolov. It used a U-shaped drawbar and a pair of extra legs that could be raised for use against aircraft. A simplified version using a single vertical bar to raise the gun was later adopted. The Sokolov was heavy and complicated, but it was robust and functional, remaining in service even after other designs were introduced. In 1915, Ivan Nikolaevich Koleshnikov introduced a lighter and simpler design; it was also wheeled but used a single pole drawbar with a seat and elbow rests for the gunner.

In 1931, the Vladimirov mounting (introduced by Semyon Vladimirovich Vladimirov) was adopted; externally it resembled the Sokolov, but it used three tubular legs that could be quickly unfolded into a tripod mounting for the anti-aircraft role (with the wheels and gun shield removed). It had the drawback of being 8 kg (18 lb) heavier than the Sokolov, resulting in a total weight of 39 kg (86 lb), which made it unpopular with soldiers. (Note: According to McNab, the Vladimirov mounting was much more popular with DShK crews.) Dedicated anti-aircraft mountings included a 1928 tripod by M. N. Kondakov, and a quad mounting designed by Nikolai Fedorovich Tokarev, which was used either at fixed installations or fitted on trucks and trains, remaining in use from 1931 until 1945. Twin and triple anti-aircraft mountings were also developed and used by the Red Army.

For transport, the Maxim could be carried on four-wheeled (tachanka) or two-wheeled (dvukolka) horse carts. In snowy conditions it could be pulled on skis or sleds by hand or ponies.

== History ==
While the PM M1910 was one of the primary machine guns of the Imperial Russian Army during World War I, (Note: The Madsen machine gun was issued to Imperial cavalry units.) production could not meet demand, and as result, the Russians had to import foreign designs, such as the Vickers and the Marlin Rockwell M1917/M1918 converted to fire the standard 7.62×54mmR cartridge.

In 1918–1920, 21,000 new Maxim M1910 machine guns were manufactured in Revolutionary Russia for the Red Army. In 1930, a modernized version M1910/30 was adopted by the Red Army. M1910/30 can be equipped with optical sight. In 1941, the gun was modernized once again. In May 1942, an order was given to begin the development of a new machine gun to replace the Maxim M1910/30. On May 15, 1943, the SG-43 machine gun was adopted and since summer 1943 Maxim guns were replaced in Soviet service by the SG-43, which retained the wheeled and shielded carriage. However, production of the Maxim did not end until 1945.

In addition to the main infantry version, there were aircraft-mounted and naval variants. Some were fitted with a tractor radiator cap fitted on top of the water jacket to allow handfuls of snow to be packed in to melt while firing.

After World War II, the Maxim was phased out of service, but was still sent in some quantities to the Korean War and Vietnam War. In 2014 during the war in Donbas, some Maxims in stock were captured by the pro-Russian separatists while others were taken from storage to be used by the Ukrainian Armed Forces. A number were used by the Ukrainian military during the Russian invasion of Ukraine due to their reputation for accuracy and reliability. In November 2016, Chief of the General Staff of the Armed Forces of Ukraine Viktor Muzhenko stated that "on the stationary posts of resistance they perform perfectly. Moreover, we have over 30,000 of them in our stores".

== Variants ==
=== Russian Empire ===
- PM M1905 − Earliest Maxim adopted by the Imperial Russian Army, it can be distinguished by the smooth bronze water jacket. Guns made before 1905 were produced by the Vickers, Sons & Maxim company in England
- PM M1910 − Improved version with a smooth sheet steel water jacket and a slightly redesigned feed mechanism. Late production guns were fitted with corrugated water jackets

=== Soviet Union ===
- PM M1910/30 − Improved version with a slightly redesigned firing and safety mechanisms and a new optical sight for indirect fire using a new heavy-bullet cartridge. Later modifications included the replacement of the Sokolov mounting with the Vladimirov, a simplified sight, and the addition of a large flap-type filler cap on the water jacket, allowing it to be filled with snow or ice in winter conditions
- Maxim-Tokarev − Air-cooled light machine gun derivative of the M1910, also known as the MT
- Maxim-Koleshnikov − Similar to the MT, it can be distinguished by the eccentric pistol grip stock
- PV-1 − Air-cooled aircraft machine gun based on the M1910. During WWII, it was also used as a ground-based anti-aircraft gun. A second version making extensive use of light alloys was also produced, but it wasn't adopted for service
- Esiunin − Upscaled version firing a 13 mm (0.51 in) cartridge, inspired by the German MG 18 TuF. Only eight prototypes were completed before further development was halted

=== Finland ===
- Maxim M/09-21 − A modification on captured Russian guns. The wheeled Sokolov mount was replaced with a folding tripod
- Maxim M/32-33 − A modernized version made by Aimo Lahti

=== Poland ===
- Maxim wz. 1910/28 − 7.92 mm Mauser conversion

== Designations ==
Russian Empire

- Maxim M1910 MG on the Sokolov M1910 wheeled mount (Russian: Пулемёт Максима образца 1910 года на колёсном станке А. А. Соколова образца 1910 года, romanized: Pulemyot Maksima obraztsa 1910 goda na kolosnom stanke A. A. Sokolova obraztsa 1910 goda, lit. 'Maxim machine gun model 1910 on the A. A. Sokolov wheeled mount model 1910')
- Maxim M1910 MG on the Kolesnikov M1915 wheeled mount (Russian: Пулемёт Максима образца 1910 года на колёсном станке И. Н. Колесникова образца 1915 года, romanized: Pulemot Maksima obraztsa 1910 goda na kolosnom stanke I. N. Kolesnikova obraztsa 1915 goda, lit. 'Maxim machine gun model 1910 on the I. N. Kolesnikov wheeled mount model 1915')

Soviet Union

- Maxim M1910 MG on the Kondakov M1928 anti-aircraft tripod (Russian: Пулемёт Максима образца 1910 года на зенитной треноге М. Н. Кондакова образца 1928 года, romanized: Pulemyot Maksima obraztsa 1910 goda na zenitnoy trenoge M. N. Kondakova obraztsa 1928 goda, lit. 'Maxim machine gun model 1910 on the M. N. Kondakov anti-aircraft tripod model 1928')
- Maxim M1910/30 machine gun on the Vladimirov M1931 wheeled mount (Russian: Пулемёт Максима образца 1910/30 года на колёсном станке С. В. Владимирова образца 1931 года, romanized: Pulemot Maksima obraztsa 1910/30 goda na kolosnom stanke S. V. Vladimirova obraztsa 1931 goda, lit. 'Maxim machine gun model 1910/30 on the S. V. Vladimirov wheeled mount model 1931')
- M-4 quadruple anti-aircraft machine gun mount (Russian: Счетверённая зенитная пулемётная установка М-4 образца 1931 года)

== Users ==
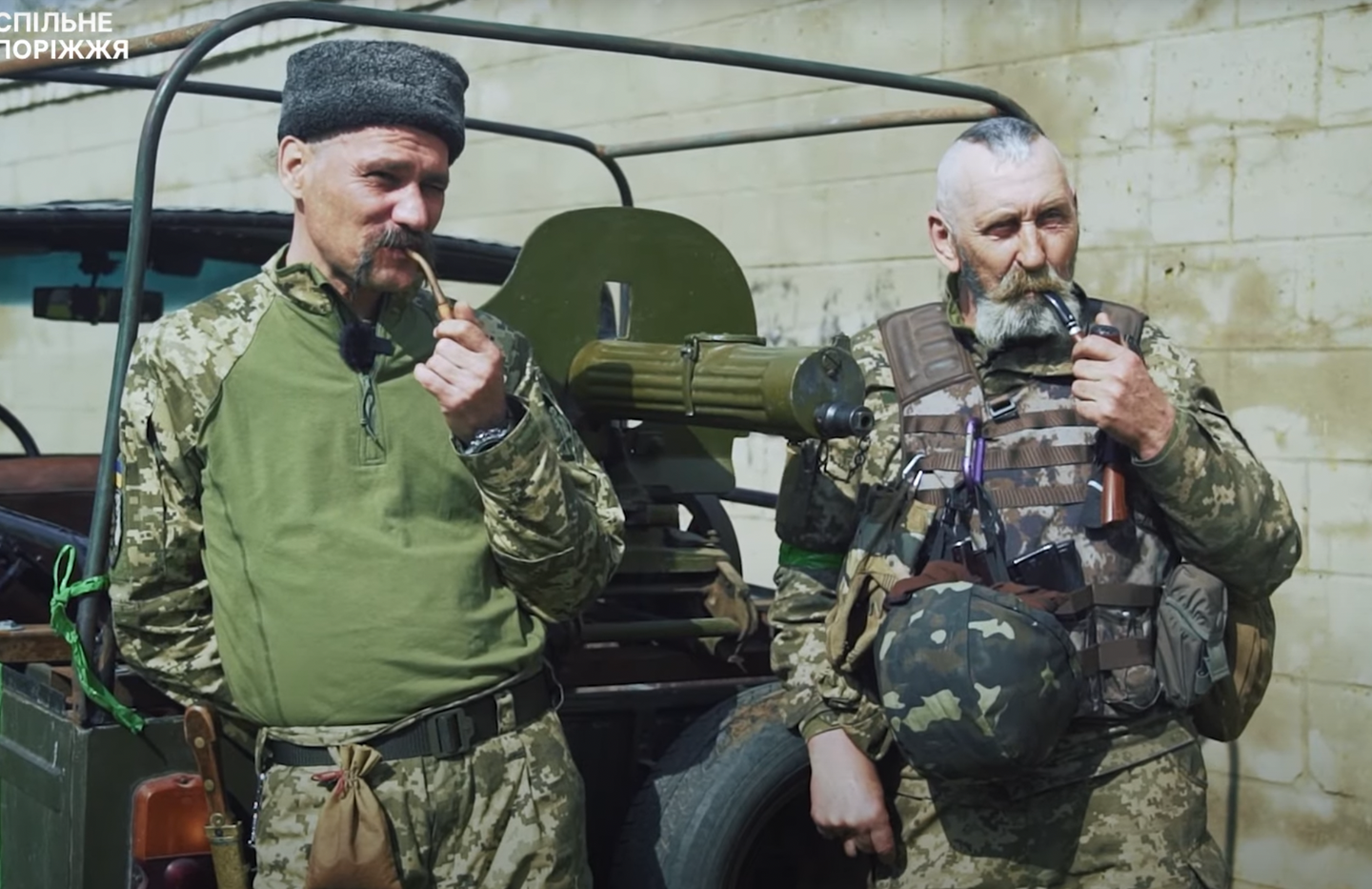
Two soldiers of the Ukrainian Territorial Defence Forces with a PM 1910/30 mounted on a technical, May 2022

=== Current ===
- Russia − Used in the Russo-Ukrainian War
- Ukraine − Over 30,000 were kept in strategic reserve prior to 2014. Used in the Russo-Ukrainian War, often modified with modern optics and suppressors

=== Former ===
- Albania − Remained in use as late as 1960
- Austria-Hungary − Seized during World War I.
- Bulgaria
- Czechoslovakia − In January 1942, the first twelve Soviet Maxim 1910/30 machine guns were given from USSR to 1st Czechoslovak Independent Infantry Battalion, later additional quantity was given to other units of the 1st Czechoslovak Army Corps.
- Finland
- German Empire − A quantity of machine guns was seized during World War I, with some converted to 7.92mm Mauser.
- Nazi Germany − In September 1939, a quantity of Polish wz. 1910 and wz. 1910/28 was seized by the Wehrmacht. After June 22, 1941, a large quantity of Soviet machine guns was seized by German troops during Axis invasion in USSR, they were designated as s.MG 216(r).
- Hungary − After June 22, 1941, a quantity of machine guns was seized by Hungarian troops during Axis invasion in USSR. Since 1945, Soviet Maxim 1910/30 machine guns were given from the Soviet Union to the People's Republic of Hungary.
- North Korea − Used during the Korean War. After the war, most were given to the Viet Minh during the 1950s and 60s
- People's Republic of China
- Poland − Designated as the Maxim wz. 1910. Some were converted to 7.92mm Mauser as the Maxim wz. 1910/28. After the war, the Polish People's Army used the wz. 1910
- Romania − At least several machine guns were captured during the Allied intervention in the Russian Civil War and disarmament of retreating armed anti-Soviet groups crossing the Romanian border in 1917 - 1920s. After June 22, 1941, an additional quantity was seized by Romanian troops during Axis invasion in USSR. In 1944, several Soviet Maxim 1910/30 machine guns were given from USSR to Romanian 1st Volunteer Infantry Division. After the 23 August 1944 coup d'état, additional Maxim 1910/30 machine guns were transferred from the Soviet Union to the Romanian Army.
- Republic of China
- Russian Empire
- Russian separatist forces in Donbas
- Soviet Union
- Spanish Republic
- Vietnam − Supplied by North Korea

== Conflicts ==
1900 – 1920s
World War I
Russian Revolution
Russian Civil War
Turkish War of Independence
Polish–Soviet War
Finnish Civil War
Estonian War of Independence
Warlord Era
Sino-Soviet conflict (1929)
1930s – 1990s
Mäntsälä Rebellion
Soviet–Japanese border conflicts
Spanish Civil War
- Chinese Civil War
  - 1^{st} Phase (1927–1936)
  - 2^{nd} Phase (1945–1949)
2^{nd} Sino-Japanese War
- World War II
  - Winter War
  - Eastern Front
  - Soviet–Japanese War
Korean War
Vietnam War
21st century
Syrian Civil War
- Russo-Ukrainian War
  - War in Donbas
  - 2022 Russian invasion of Ukraine

== Gallery ==
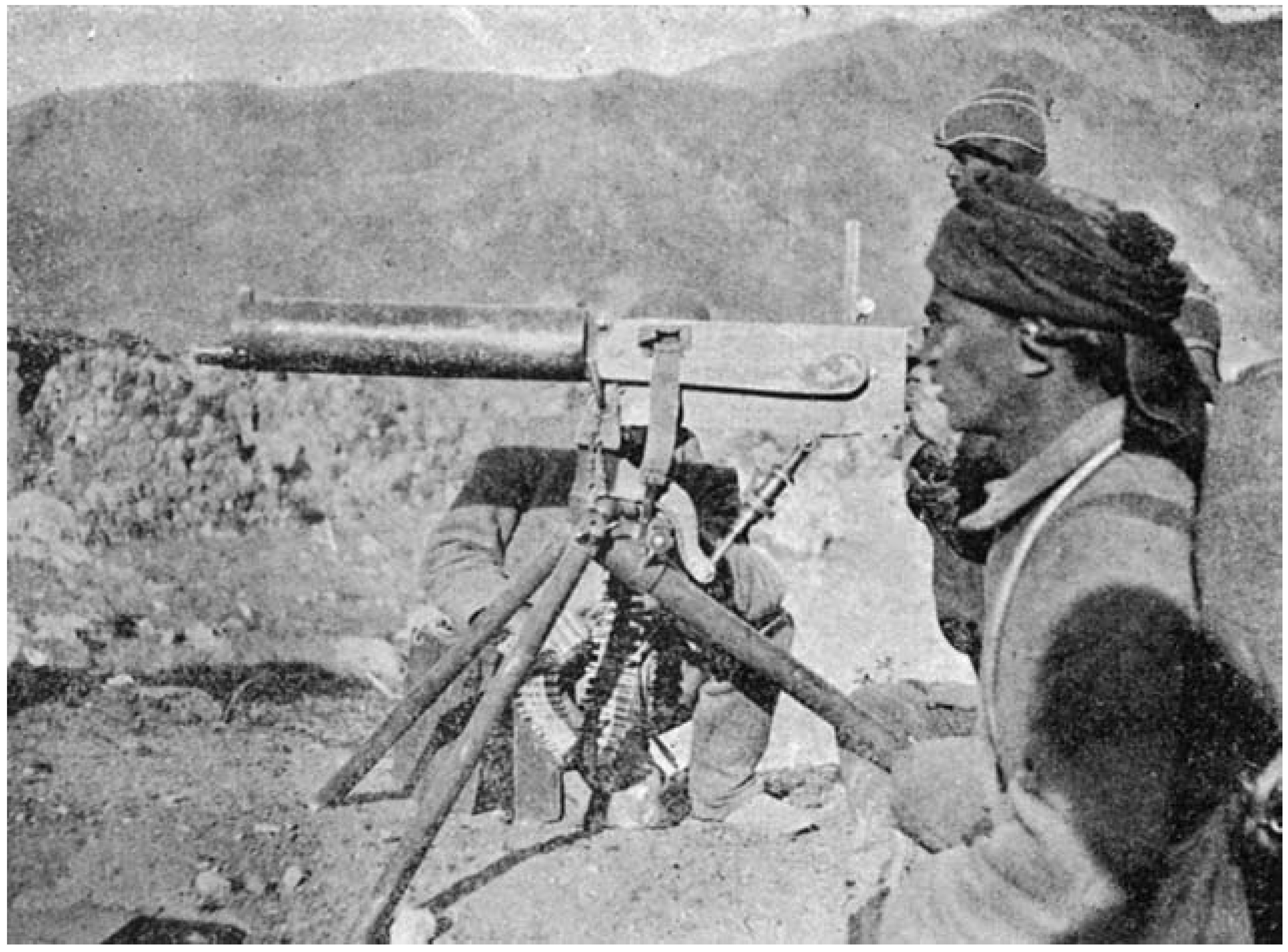
Ottoman soldiers with a captured Russian Maxim machine gun during WWI

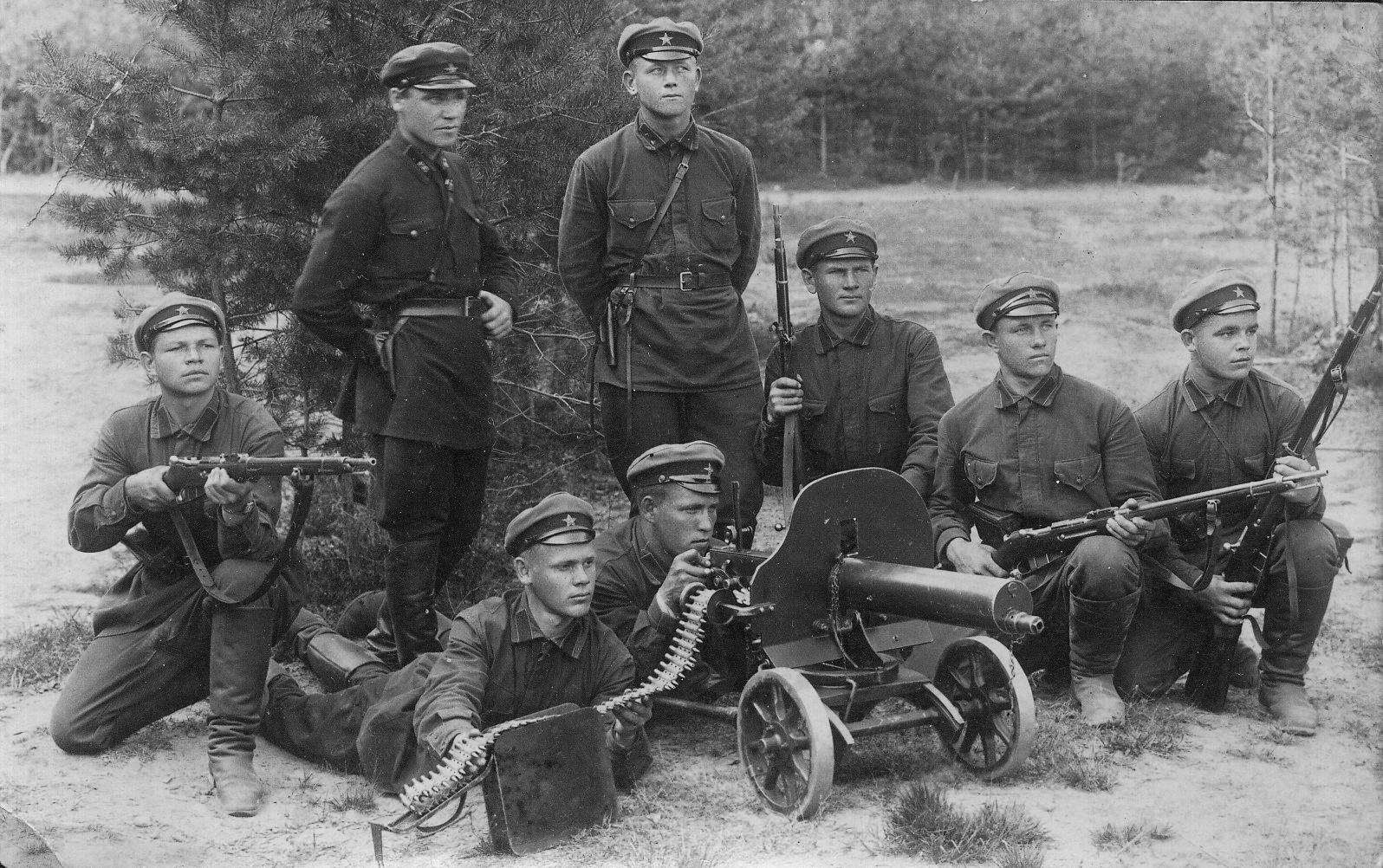
Soviet Red Army military personnel with a Maxim M1910 machine gun, late 1920s and early 1930s

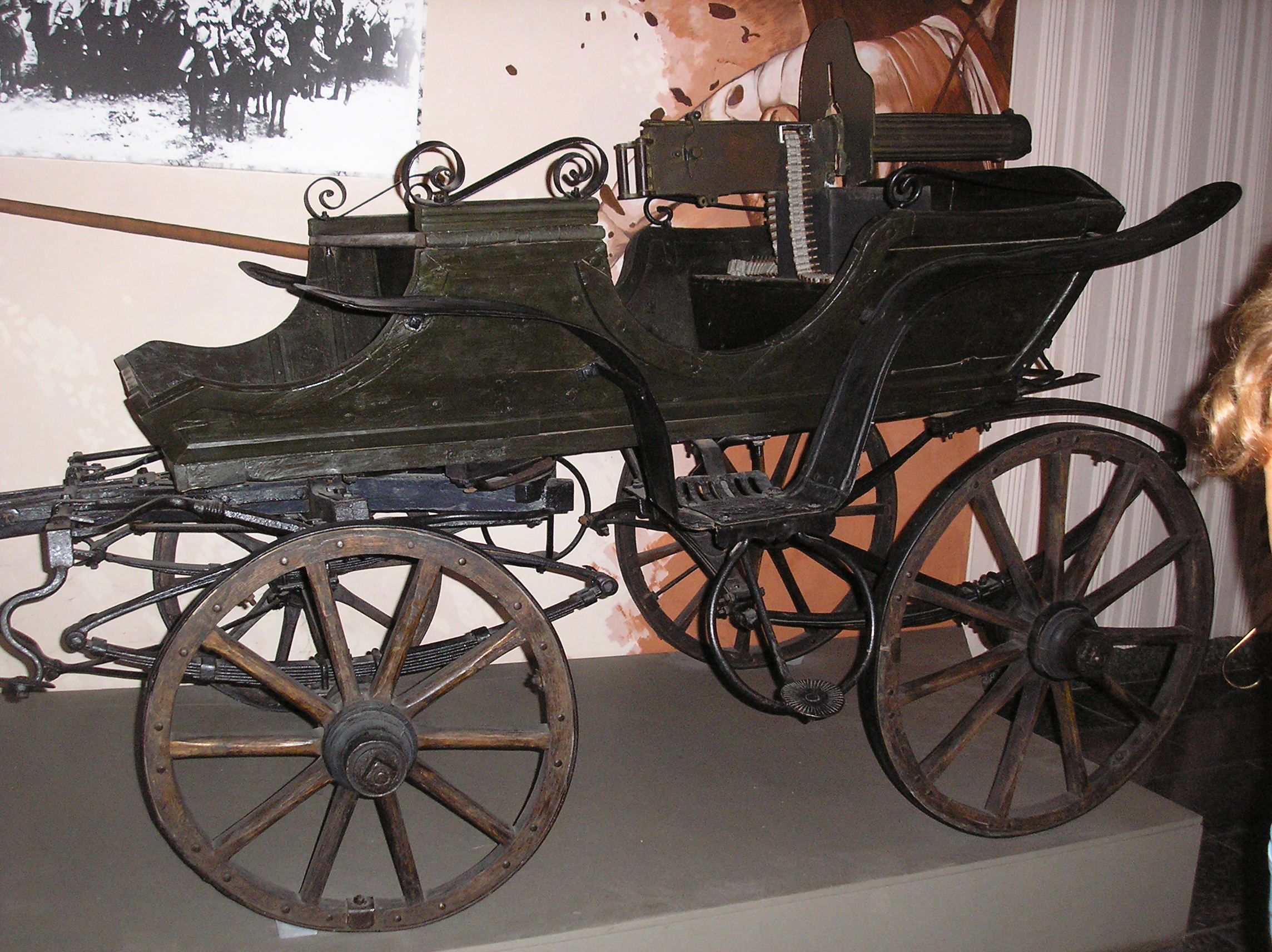
A Makhnovist tachanka on display in the Huliaipole museum; notice that it is mounted with the PM M1910/30

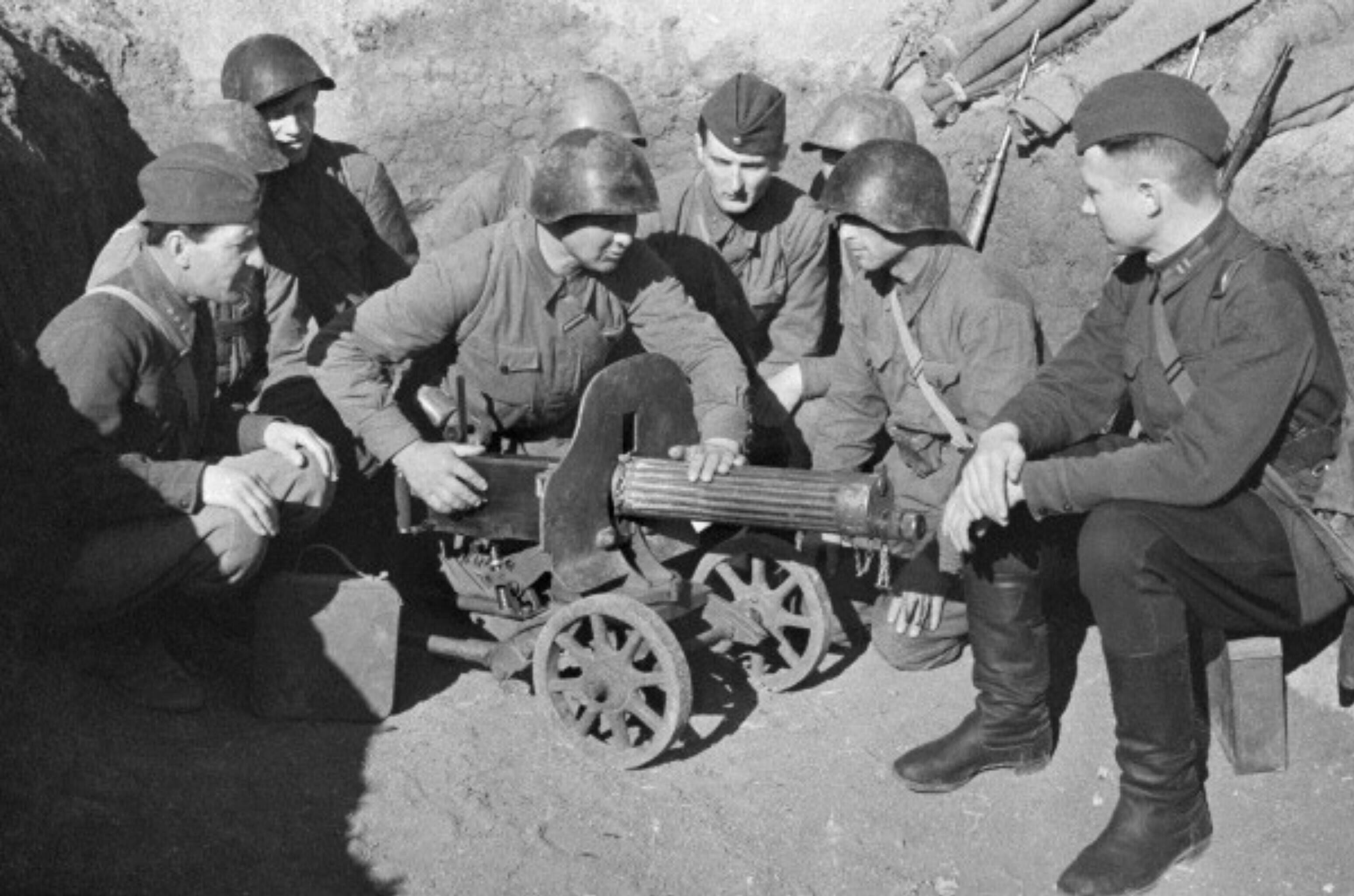
Soviet troops receiving instruction on the PM M1910/30

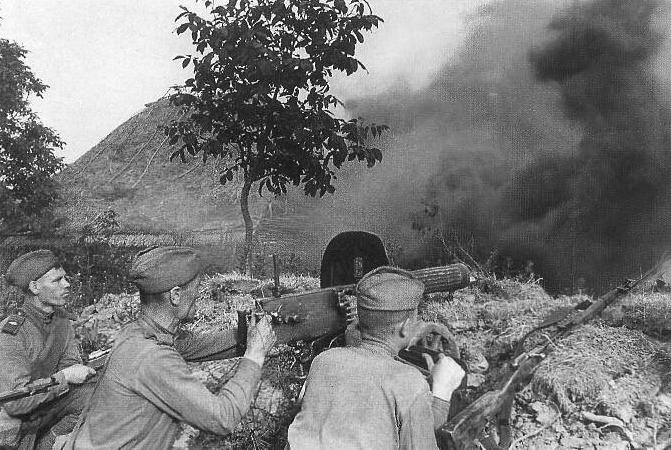
Soviet Red Army machinegunners with the PM M1910/30 in the Battle of Kursk

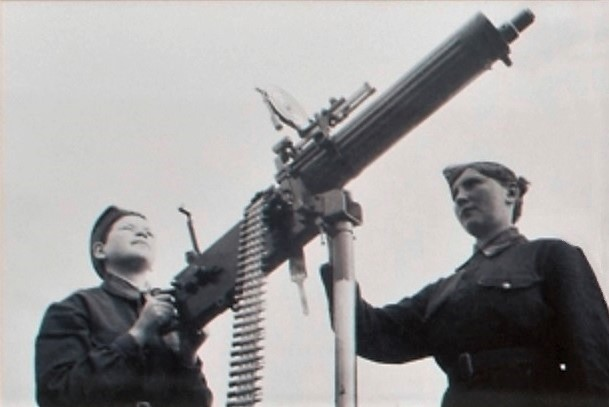
Soviet female military personnel with the Maxim M1910/30 machine gun on the Kondakov M1928 anti-aircraft tripod, 1941

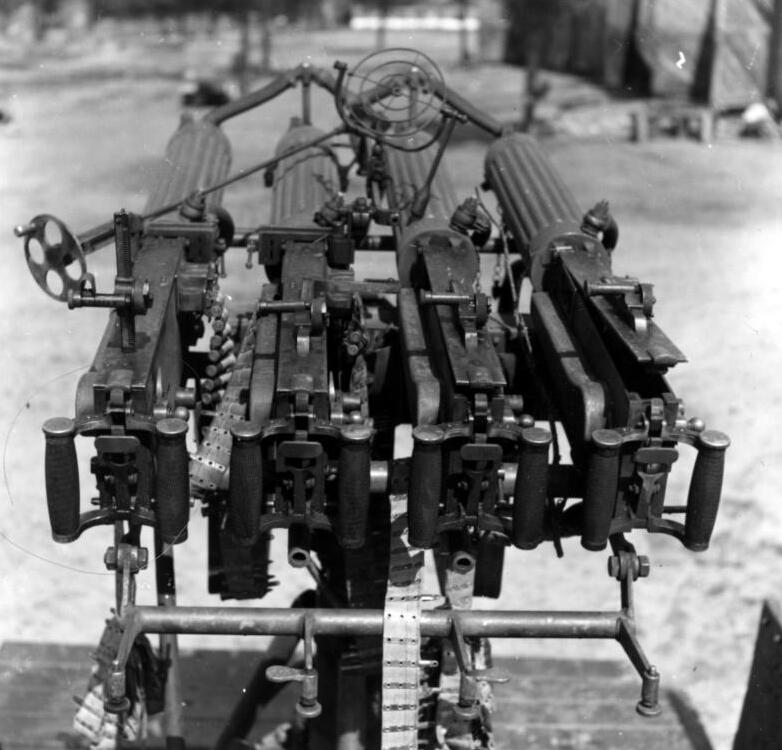
M-4 quadruple anti-aircraft machine gun mount (rear view)

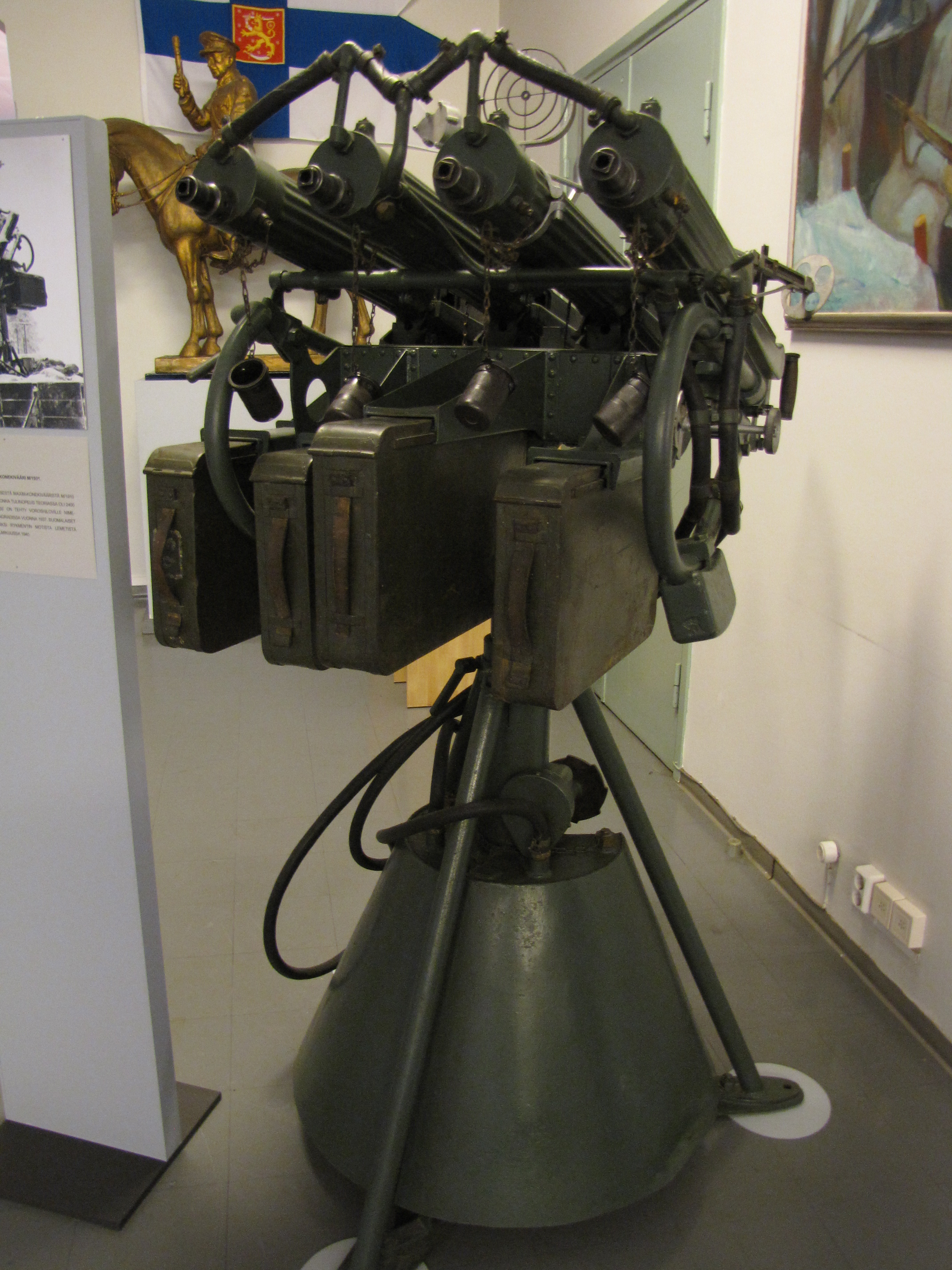
M-4 quadruple anti-aircraft machine gun mount (front view)

== See also ==
- List of Russian weaponry
- Maxim gun
- MG-08
- Vickers machine gun
