= Canon de 75 modèle 1922 Schneider =

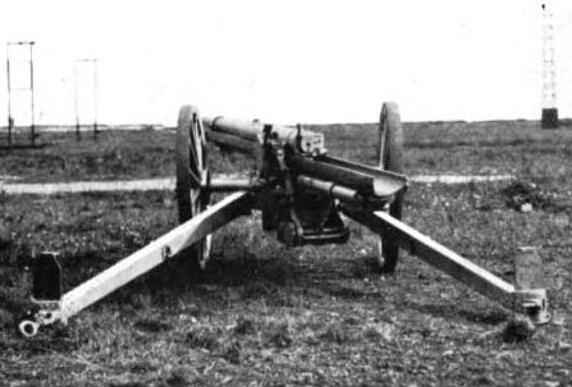
- Type: field gun
- Place of origin: France

Service history
- Used by: Finland
- Wars: World War II

Production history
- Designer: Schneider
- Manufacturer: Schneider

Specifications
- Mass: 1,320 kilograms (2,910 lb)
- Barrel length: 2.347 metres (7 ft 8 in) L/31.3
- Shell: 6.3 kilograms (14 lb)
- Caliber: 75 mm (2.95 in)
- Carriage: Split trail
- Elevation: -5° to +43°
- Traverse: 50°
- Muzzle velocity: 600 m/s (1,968 ft/s)
- Maximum firing range: 12,000 metres (13,000 yd)

The Canon de 75 modèle 1922 Schneider was a field gun designed by Schneider in the early 1920s. France didn't buy any as it had an enormous stock of surplus Canon de 75 modèle 1897 field guns on hand and it was offered for export. Chamberlain and Gander claim that Finland bought some and used them during the Winter War.
