= Maxim M/32-33 =

7,62 mm Maxim M/32-33
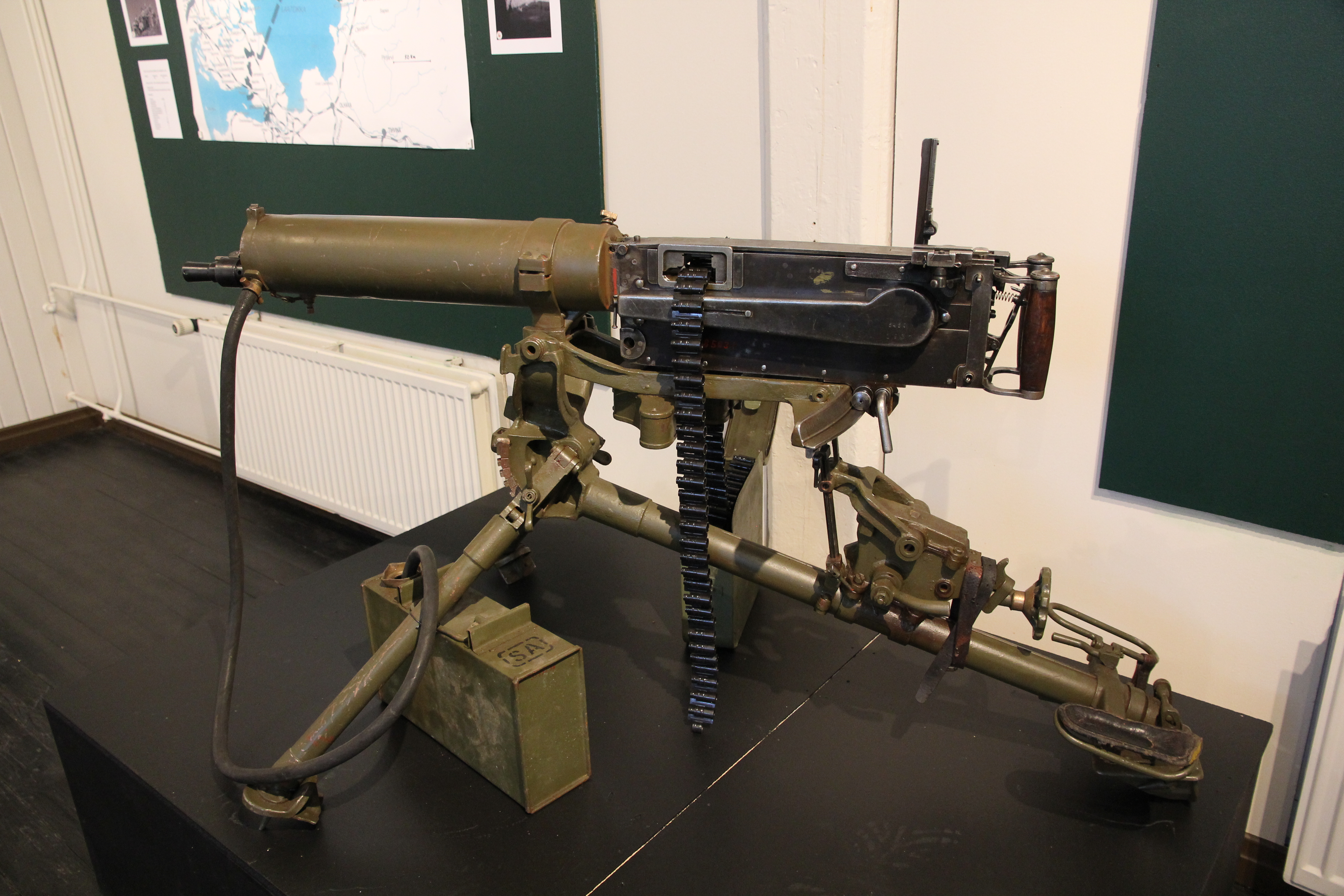
- Type: Heavy machine gun
- Place of origin: Finland

Service history
- In service: 1933–1950
- Used by: Finland
- Wars: World War II; Winter War; Continuation War

Production history
- Designed: 1931
- Produced: 1933–1944
- No. built: ~1200

Specifications
- Mass: 24 kg, M/33 tripod: 30 kg
- Length: 1180 mm
- Barrel length: 721 mm
- Cartridge: 7.62×53mmR
- Action: recoil
- Rate of fire: 650–850 rounds/min
- Effective firing range: 2000 m
- Feed system: 200-round metallic belt

The Maxim M/32-33 is a Finnish modification of the Russian M1910 Maxim, developed by Aimo Lahti in 1932. Lahti was ordered to adapt the Maxim so that it could be fed with more modern metallic ammunition belts as opposed to the original cloth belts. The resulting weapon was able to fire at a rate of 850 rounds/min, whereas the Russian M1910 and earlier Finnish M09-21 were only capable of 600 rounds/min. The increased rate of fire was achieved through improvements that included an accelerator mechanism and muzzle booster. Other changes included a redesign of the Maxim M/32-33's grips and rear sights, as well as an installation point for an optical sight.

Unlike all the other Finnish Maxims, the Maxim M/32-33 was designed from the outset to be suitable for anti-aircraft use. The new M/32 tripod was designed and issued with extra parts allowing it to be easily converted to an anti-aircraft mount, and accessories for anti-aircraft shooting were included as standard.

The last improvement to the M/32-33 was the addition of a snow-filling cap to the water jacket; this way snow could be used instead of water during winter, so there was no need to carry and take care of 3 liters of coolant water in snowy sub-zero conditions. This feature was also adopted on late World War II Russian Maxim variants.

A few hundred early M/09s were modified to the M/32 standard by Gun Depot 1 between 1933 and 1935. These weapons have also been called M/09-32s.
