= 42-line field gun M1877 =

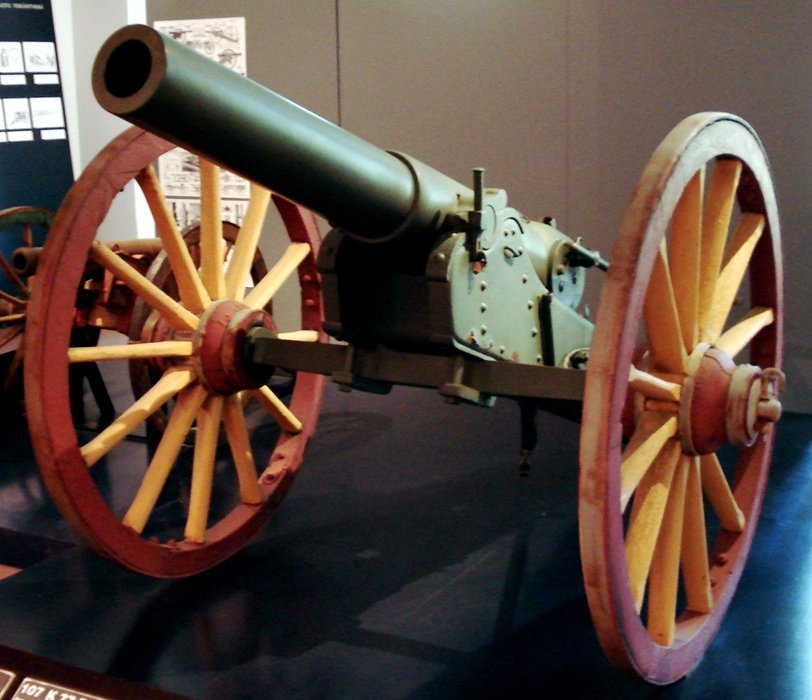
- 42-line field gun M1877 in Hämeenlinna Artillery Museum.
- Type: field gun
- Place of origin: German Empire; Russian Empire

Production history
- Designer: Krupp
- Designed: 1877

Specifications
- Mass: 1213 kg (2675 lbs)
- Barrel length: L/19 : 19 calibres 6.63 ft (2.02 m)
- Caliber: 4.2 inch (106.7 mm)
- Breech: Horizontal sliding-block
- Carriage: wheeled carriage
- Muzzle velocity: 411 m/s (1,348 ft/s)
- Maximum firing range: 5,300 m (5,800 yds)

42-line battery field gun M1877 (Russian: 42-линейная батарейная полевая пушка образца 1877 года) was a field gun used by the Russian Imperial Army in late 19th and early 20th centuries. The word "line" in the designation refers to a measurement unit which equals 0.1 inch.

== History ==
The 42-line field gun M1877 was designed by Krupp. Some of the guns were manufactured in Germany while most of them were manufactured in the Obuhov factory in Russia. Use of the guns were limited by lack of equipment needed for indirect fire - the Russian gun-sight used with them was suitable only to direct fire. Therefore, the gun saw use as fortress and coastal artillery for coastal defence which allowed the guns to shoot direct fire for defending harbours and beaches.

In 1918 the Finnish Army could capture some 102 42-line field guns and put them into service. Last shots being fired with the field gun were during the Winter War in March 1940.

The 42-line field gun M1877 could fire high explosive (HE) or shrapnel shells of 12.5 kg (27.6 lbs) weight at a distance of 5.3 km (3.3 miles).

The 42-line field gun M1877 should not be confused with the 42-line siege gun M1877, a siege gun version which had a longer barrel and higher muzzle velocity.

== Literature ==
- Shirokorad A. B. - Encyclopedia of the Soviet Artillery - Mn. Harvest, 2000 (Широкорад А. Б. Энциклопедия отечественной артиллерии. — Мн.: Харвест, 2000., ISBN 985-433-703-0)
