= Maxim M/09-21 =

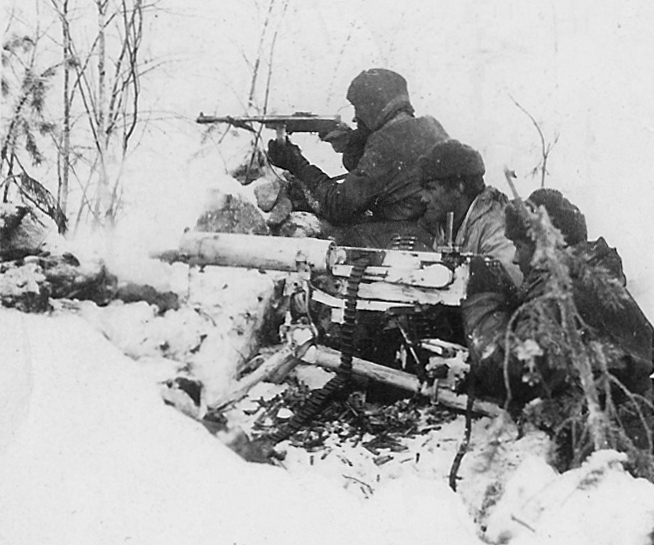
- A Maxim M/09-21 heavy machine gun in use during the Continuation War.
- Type: Heavy machine gun
- Place of origin: Russian Empire; Finland

Service history
- In service: 1921–1960s
- Used by: Finland
- Wars: World War II

Production history
- Produced: 1924–1933
- No. built: 1065 (June 1940)

Specifications
- Mass: 58.1 kg (Fully loaded): Gun body: 26.5 kg (58.42 lb); M/21 Tripod: 27.6 kg (60.85 lb); Water: 4 kg (8.82 lb)
- Length: 1,110 mm (43.70 in)
- Barrel length: 720 mm (28.35 in)
- Crew: 5
- Shell: 7.62×53mmR (Note: Most sources mentions the 7.62×54mmR but the Finnish military used both, and firearms that uses the 7.62×53mmR could use the 7.62×54mmR as well.); 7.62×54mmR
- Caliber: 7.62 mm (0.3 in)
- Action: Short recoil
- Carriage: Tri-pod
- Rate of fire: Cyclic: 600 rounds/min; Practical: 350 rounds/min
- Feed system: 250-round fabric belt; 200-round metallic belt
- Sights: Front Blade; Rear Leaf

The Maxim M/09-21 is a Maxim machine gun variant made by Finland and used by the Finnish army during World War II.

== History ==
The Finnish Civil War in 1918 led to Finland becoming an independent democratic republic. The new Finnish army needed a machine gun to distribute to its troops. The most easily accessible machine guns were Russian PM M1910 Maxim machine guns captured during the civil war, but the wheeled mounts the machine guns used were unsuited to Finnish terrain which was mainly forests. Finland decided to make their own Maxim variant, more suited to the Finnish terrain, by developing a tripod and then mounting a Russian Maxim machine gun on it. The tripod, which would be ready for production in 1921, was derived from the one on the DWM's MG 09 machine gun (the export version of the MG 08 machine gun) which Finland had used successfully during the civil war.

The Maxim M/09-21 machine guns were mainly issued to Finnish front-line infantry and saw very hard combat use, resulted in heavy losses and lots of worn-out guns and tripods. In June 1940, 1065 guns still existed in Finnish inventory. By June 1st in 1944, their total number had dropped to 964. Despite extensive repairs and maintenance programs started in 1950s, less than half of the produced guns remained. By the mid 1980s, there were less than 400 guns surviving. They remained mothballed for possible further use until being sold off or scrapped in the mid 1990s.

== Design ==
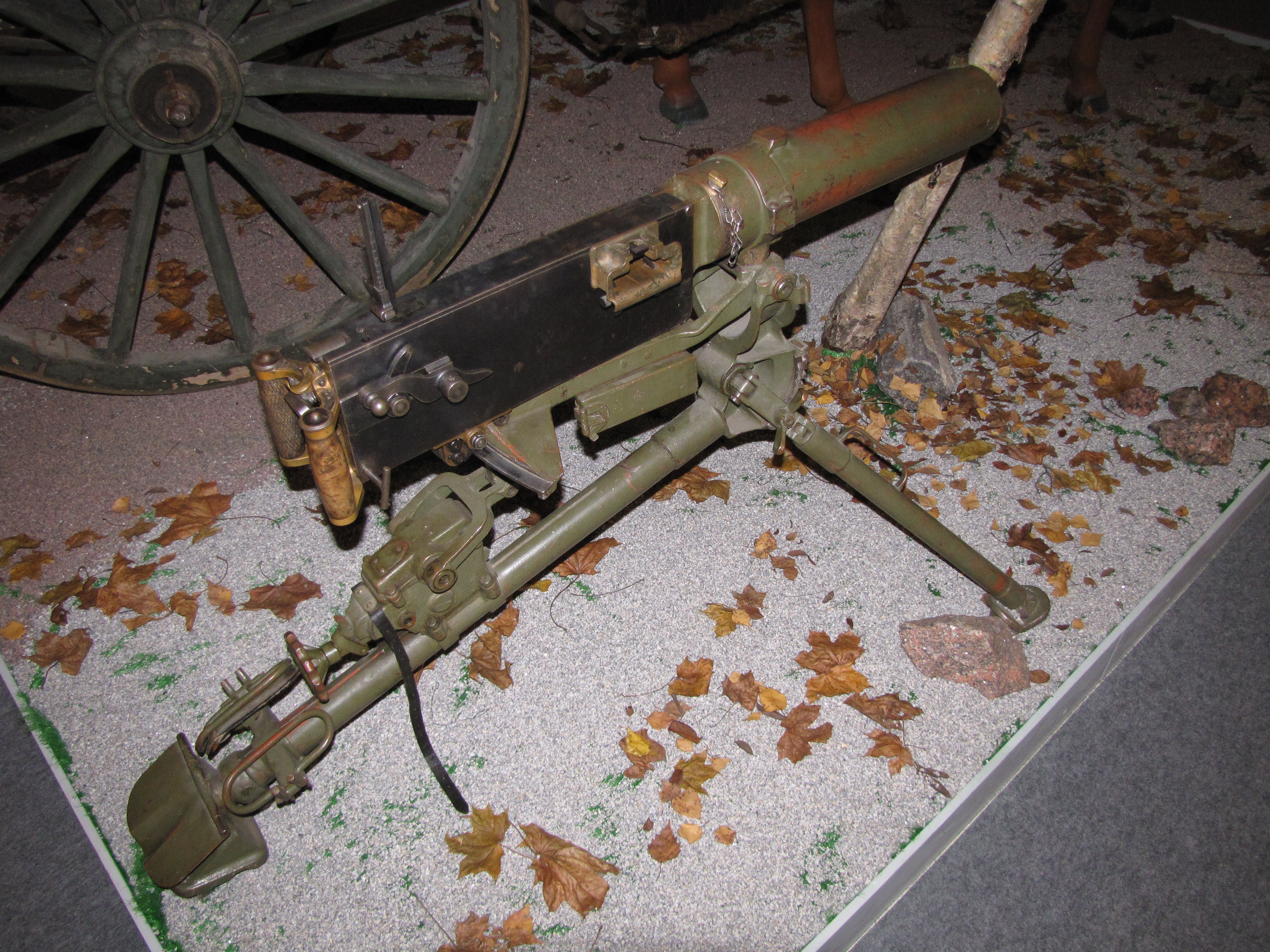
Rear of Maxim M/09-21 machine gun

Finnish changes to the original Russian Maxim included manufacturing modifications and a simplified gunsight which changed the sight measurements to the metric system.

The tripod mount could fold for easier carrying and had metal carrying handles on each of the two front legs.

In 1943, the Finnish Army normally issued each M/09-21 machine guns with either twenty 200-round fabric belts or twenty-five 200-round steel belts, along with spare barrels, tools and other equipment.
