= List of former equipment of the Finnish Army =

This is an (incomplete) list of former equipment used by the Finnish Army. For current equipment, see here.

== Tanks (and tank-based armoured vehicles) ==
=== Cold War era tanks ===
| Model | Origin | Type | Quantity | Image | Details |
|---|---|---|---|---|---|
| PT-76 PT-A | Soviet Union | Amphibious light tank Driver training tank | 12 units 8 units | | In use between 1963 and 1994. Some PT-76s were converted into the PT-A training tanks (for the BTR-50) after they stopped being used as light tanks. |
| T-72M1 T-72M1K T-72M1K1 | Soviet Union | Main battle tank Command tank Command tank | 157 units 3 units 2 units | | In use between 1984 and 2006, 63 T-72M1 and T-72M1K from the Soviet Union in 1984–86, and 97 from ex-East Germany in 1992 (of these 66 were made in Czechoslovakia, and 33 were made in Poland). 162 units total. |
| T-55, after modernization T-55M T-55K, after modernization T-55MK | Soviet Union | Main battle tank Command tank | 64 units 10 units | | In use since 1966, modernized in 1989, total 74 units, 9 still in use 2021. |
| T-54 | Soviet Union | Main battle tank | 43 units | | The variant is the T-54-3, also known as M1951. It was in use between 1959 and 1969 (and removed from storage in 2005), 43 units. |
| Comet Mk I Model B | United Kingdom | Cruiser tank | 41 units | | In use between 1960 and 1971. |
| Charioteer Mk VII Model B | United Kingdom | Medium tank | 38 units | | In use between 1958 and 1980. |
| MTU-20 | Soviet Union | Bridge laying tank | 4 units | | |

=== World War II tanks ===
| Model | Origin | Type | Quantity | Image | Details |
|---|---|---|---|---|---|
| ISU-152 ISU-152V | Soviet Union | Self-propelled gun Armoured recovery vehicle | 1 unit 1 unit | | The standard ISU-152 was captured, operated and abandoned in 1944. Another was captured in 1944 and rebuilt into an armoured recovery vehicle and was used between 1944 and 1959. |
| Panzerkampfwagen IV Ausf. J | Germany | Medium tank | 15 units | | In use between 1944 and 1962. |
| Sturmgeschütz 40G (Stu-40) Sturmgeschütz III Ausf. G (StuG III) | Germany | Assault gun | 30 units 29 units | | In use between 1943 and 1966. In use between 1944 and 1966. |
| KV-1E m 1941 KV-1 m 1942 | Soviet Union | Heavy tank | 1 unit 1 unit | | In use between 1943 and 1954. In use between 1942 and 1954. |
| T-50 | Soviet Union | Light infantry tank | 1 unit | | Modified in Finland with additional armour. In use between 1942 and 1954. |
| T-34-76 T-34-85 | Soviet Union | Medium tank | 9 units 9 units | | The short-barreled tanks were m 1941, m 1942 and m 1943 models. These were captured vehicles that were in use between 1941 and 1961. The T34-85 were in use between 1944 and 1961. Two units were registered in the inventory, but were never in operational use. |
| BT-42 | Finland | Assault gun | 18 units | | Modified Soviet BT-7 tank. In use between 1943 – 1944. |
| BT-43 | Finland | Armoured personnel carrier | 1 unit | | Modified Soviet BT-7 tank. In use between 1944 and 1945. |
| BT-2 BT-5 BT-7 | Soviet Union | Cavalry tank | 15 units 62 units 53 units | | Several captured in the Winter War and in 1941. The tank was in use only during 1941 and was soon replaced by the T-26 due to its poor reliability. The remaining tanks were either stored, rebuilt, dismantled (turrets being included into permanent casements), or scrapped. |
| T-28, later modified to T-28E standard T-28E T-28V | Soviet Union | Medium tank Medium tank Armoured recovery vehicle | 6 units 1 unit 1 unit | | Two m 1938 were captured in the Winter War and the remainder in 1941. In use from 1939 to 1950. The T-28V was a modified T-28E and was used from 1945 to 1950. |
| T-20 m 1937, T-20 m 1938, 1939 | Soviet Union | Artillery tractor | 33 units 184 units | | In use from 1939 to 1959. |
| T-38 and T-38M-2 T-38-34 T-38-KV | Soviet Union | Amphibious light tank | 19 units 11 units 4 units | | The -34 and -KV were driver training tanks for the T-34 and KV-series of tanks. In use 1939 to 1945. In use 1944 to 1959. In use 1944 to 1959. |
| T-37A tank | Soviet Union | Amphibious light tank | 29 units | | In use 1939 to 1942. |
| T-26 m 1931 T-26 m 1933 T-26 m 1937 and T-26 m 1939 OT-26 OT-130 OT-133 T-26E T-26T | Soviet Union | Light tank Light tank Light tank Flamethrower tank Flamethrower tank Flamethrower tank Light tank Artillery tractor | 12 units 63 units 36 units 2 units 4 units 3 units 63 units 6 units | | In use 1939 to 1945. In use 1939 to 1959. In use 1939 to 1959. In use 1939 to 1945. In use 1941 to 1942. In use 1942 In use 1939 to 1959. In use 1942 to 1959. |

=== Pre-war tanks ===
| Model | Origin | Type | Quantity | Image | Details |
|---|---|---|---|---|---|
| Vickers 6-Ton | United Kingdom | Light tank | 32 units | | In use 1933 to 1959. |
| Vickers-Carden-Lloyd Model 1933 Vickers-Carden-Lloyd Mk VI | United Kingdom | Tankette | 1 unit 1 unit | | Only in use in 1933. |
| Saint-Charmond modèle 1921 | France | Light tank | 1 unit | | In use 1923 to 1937. |
| Renault FT-17 | France | Light tank | 34 units | | In use 1919 to 1942. |

== Other armoured vehicles ==
=== IFVs and APCs ===
| Model | Origin | Type | Quantity | Image | Details |
Infantry fighting vehicles
| BMP-1 BMP-1TJ BMP-K1 BMP-PS BMP-1K | Soviet Union | Infantry fighting vehicle Forward observation post vehicle Command vehicle _ Command vehicle | 195 units | | In use between 1982 and 2004. Bought in two batches (85 in 1981 from the Soviet Union and 110 from ex-East German stocks in the beginning of the 1990s). |
Armoured personnel carriers (tracked)
| BTR-50 BTR-50PK BTR-50PU after modernization: BTR-50YVI BTR-50YVI-EK BTR-50PUM BTR-50PUM1 BTR-50PUM2 | Soviet Union | Armoured personnel carrier Armoured Personnel Carrier Command vehicle _ Command vehicle HQ vehicle Armoured Personnel Carrier Armoured Personnel Carrier Armoured Personnel Carrier | 118 units 110 units 8 units _ 40 units _ _ _ Few | | In use between 1980s–2010s. The YVI came in 5 different versions. |
Armoured personnel carriers (wheeled)
| BTR-60 BTR-60PA BTR-60PB BTR-60PUM BTR-60 R-145BM BTR-60PBK | Soviet Union | Armoured personnel carrier | ? 1 unit 83 units Few Few Few | | In use between 1980s–2000s. Total 112 units. |
| BTR-80 | Soviet Union | Armoured personnel carrier | 2 units | | Test vehicles, later converted to command vehicles in BTR-60 units. |
| Valmet 1912-6 | Finland | Armoured Personnel Carrier | 1 unit | | 1 prototype unit (lost competition to Sisu XA-180) |
| VK | Finland | Armoured Personnel Carrier | 1 unit | | 1 prototype unit (lost competition to Sisu XA-180) |

=== Armoured cars ===
| Model | Origin | Type | Quantity | Image | Details |
|---|---|---|---|---|---|
| BA-10 BA-10N | Soviet Union | Armoured car | 24 units | | In use between 1939 and 1959. |
| BA-6 BA-3 | Soviet Union | Armoured car | 10 units 1 unit | | In use between 1944 and 1956 In use between 1944 and 1954. |
| FAI-M BA-20 BA-20M | Soviet Union | Armoured car | 18 units | | In use between 1939 and 1956. |
| FAI | Soviet Union | Armoured car | 3 units | | In use between 1943 and 1950. |
| D-8 | Soviet Union | Armoured car | 1 unit | | In use between 1941 and 1942. |
| Landsverk 182 | Sweden | Armoured car | 1 unit | | In use between 1936 and 1941. |
| Fiat armored car | Italy | Armoured car | 1 unit | | In use between 1918–early 1920s. |
| Austin Model 1917 | United Kingdom | Armoured car | ? units | | In use between 1918–early 1920s. |
| Peerless | United Kingdom | Armoured car | ? units | | |

== Various vehicles ==
| Model | Origin | Type | Quantity | Image | Details |
|---|---|---|---|---|---|
| DAF YAD 4442 DAF YAS 4442 | Netherlands | 4×4 All-terrain truck | ? | | |
| Sisu Nasu | Finland | Tracked articulated vehicle | | | In use between 1980s–2017. 27 NA-122 self-propelled mortars and 12 NA-123 ammunition supply vehicles are still in use. |
| Bandvagn 202 | Sweden | Tracked articulated vehicle | 15 units | | |
| Lynx GLX 5900 | Finland; Canada | Snowmobile | ? | | |
| MAZ-537G | Soviet Union | Tank transporter | 6 units | | Pulling the ChMZAP-5247G semi-trailer. |
| GT-SM | Soviet Union | Tracked transport vehicle | | | |
| ATS-59 | Soviet Union | Artillery tractor | 28 units | | In use between 1965 and 2002. |
| AT-S | Soviet Union | Artillery tractor | 50 units | | In use between 1960 and 2002. |
| Raupenschlepper Ost | Germany | Artillery tractor | 20 units | | In use between 1943–. |
| Sisu KB-45 | Finland | Off-road lorry | 83 units | | In use between 1965 and 2008. |
| Sisu A-45 | Finland | Off-road lorry | About 500 units | | In use between 1970 and 2008. |
| Sisu Karhu | Finland | 4×2 trucks | ? | | |
| Sisu Kontio | Finland | 6×2 heavy truck | ? | | |
| Sisu SA-110 Sammakko | Finland | 4×4 armoured truck manufactured between A-45 and Sisu SA-151 | 6 units | | Only some 6 produced and used in UN missions. |
| Sisu SA-130 Masi | Finland | 4×4 All-terrain trucks | ? | | |
| Sisu SK-250 | Finland | 6×2 heavy truck | ? | | |
| Sisu SL171 | Finland | 4×4 All-terrain trucks | ? | | |
| Vanaja VAKS | Finland | Military truck | 155 units | | In use between 1960–. |
| Vanaja NS-47 | Finland | Military truck | 38 units | | In use between 1962–. |
| Sd.Kfz. 9 | Germany | Half-track | 2 units | | In use between 1943–. Recovery vehicle, arrived with the purchase of the StuG III assault guns. |
| Büssing-Nag 4500 A | Germany | Lorry | | | In use between 1943 and 1945. |
| M2 half-track car | United States | Half-track | 213 units | | In use between 1948 and 1964. |
| McCormick TD-14 | United States | Artillery tractor | | | In use between 1940 until the 1950s. |
| Ford Thames | United Kingdom | Military truck | 115 units | | |
| ZIL-157 | Soviet Union | Military truck | 86 units | | In use between 1962 until the 1990s. |
| KrAZ-255B | Soviet Union | Military truck | | | In use between 1962 until the 2010s. |
| ZIL-131 | Soviet Union | Military truck | About 400 units | | In use between 1973 until the 2010s. |
| UAZ-452 | Soviet Union | Off-road van | | | In use between 1973 until the 2010s. |
| UAZ-469 UAZ-315126 | Soviet Union | Off-road military light utility vehicle | 250+ units | | In use between 1976 until the 2000s. |
| GAZ-51 | Soviet Union | Military truck | 100 units | | In use between 1962 until 1970s. |
| GAZ-66 | Soviet Union | Off-road lorry | 440 units | | In use between 1972 until the 2000s. |
| GAZ-69 | Soviet Union | Off-road military light utility vehicle | | | |
| Unimog D | Germany | Military truck | 99 units | | In use between 1955 until ?. |
| Unimog G | Germany | Military truck | 69 units | | In use between 1955 until ?. |
| Valmet 702 | Finland | Tractor | | | |
| Fabrique Nationale AS 24 | Belgium | Motorized tricycle | | | |
| Armored train | Russian Empire | Armored train | | | In use 1918–. |

== Artillery ==
=== Field guns ===
==== Light field guns (63–84 mm) ====
| Model | Origin | Type | Quantity | Image | Details |
|---|---|---|---|---|---|
| 84 K 18 | United Kingdom | Field gun | 30 units | | In use between 1940 and 1960 |
| 77 K 96 | German Empire | Field gun | 8 units | | In use between 1918 and 1926 |
| 76 K 42 | Soviet Union | Field gun | 12 units | | In use between 1944–. |
| 76 K 39 | Soviet Union | Field gun | 9 units | | In use between 1939–. |
| 76 VK 38 | Soviet Union | Field gun | 9 units | | In use between 1939 and 1951. |
| 76 K 36 | Soviet Union | Field gun | 76 units | | In use between 1939 and 1994. |
| 76 RekK 35 or 76 K/DRP | | Field gun | 2 units | | In use between 1939 and 1941 |
| 76 K 23 | France | Field gun | 4 units | | In use between 1924 and 1945. |
| 76 VK 09 | Soviet Union | Mountain gun | 18 units | | In use between 1918 and 1946. |
| 76 VK 04 | Soviet Union | Mountain gun | 11 units | | In use between 19 and 19 |
| 76 K 02-38 | | Field gun | | | |
| 76 K 02 | Soviet Union | Field gun | 249 units | | In use between 1918 and 1994. |
| 76 K 02-30 | Soviet Union | Field gun | 93 units | | In use between 1941 and 1994. |
| 76 K 02-30/40 | Soviet Union | Field gun | 14 units | | In use between 1941 and 1994. |
| 76 K 02-34 | Soviet Union | Field gun | 1 unit | | In use between 1934 and 1941. |
| 76 K 02-38 | Soviet Union | Field gun | 2 units | | In use between 1938 and 1942. |
| 76 K 00 | Soviet Union | Field gun | 34 units | | In use between 1918–. |
| 75 K 40 A, later 76 K 37 | Sweden | Field gun | 8 units | | In use between 1940–. |
| 75 K 36 | | Field gun | 1 unit | | In use between 1939–. |
| 75 K 17 | United States | Field gun | 200 units | | In use between 1940–1990s. |
| 75 VK L14 | German Empire | Mountain gun | 12 units | | In use between 1918 and 1931. |
| 75 K 11 | Italy | Field gun | 1 unit | | In use between 1929–. |
| 75 K 02 | Sweden | Field gun | 36 units | | In use between 1929–. |
| 75 K 01 | Norway (German Empire) | Field gun | 12 units | | In use between 1940 and 1944. |
| 75 VK 98 | Japan | Mountain gun | 44 units | | In use between 1918 and 1937. |
| 75 K 97 | France | Field gun | 48 units | | In use between 1940 and 1962. |
| 63 K 84 | | Field gun | 4 units | | In use between 1918–. |

==== Medium field guns (105–122 mm) ====
| Model | Origin | Type | Quantity | Image | Details |
|---|---|---|---|---|---|
| 122 K 60 | Finland | Field gun | 15 units | | Later modernized into 130 K 90–60. In use between 1960 and 1990. |
| 122 K 31 | Soviet Union | Field gun | 29 units | | In use between 1941 and the 1970s. |
| 120 K 78-31 | Poland | Field gun | 24 units | | In use between 1940 and the 1960s. |
| 120 K 78-16 | France | Field gun | 72 units | | In use between 1940 and the 1960s. |
| 107 K 13 | France | Field gun | 2 units | | In use between 1940 and the 1960s. |
| 107 K 10 | Russian Empire | Field gun | 9 units | | In use between 1940 and the 1960s. |
| 105 KH 36 | Sweden | Field gun | 1 unit | | Equipped with a replacement barrel. In use between 1940 and the 1960s. |
| 105 K 34 | Sweden | Field gun | 12 units | | In use between 1940 and the 1960s. |
| 105 K 29 | Poland | Field gun | 54 units | | In use between 1941–. |
| 105 K 13 | France | Field gun | 22 units | | In use between 1940–. |
| 105 K 10 | Russian Empire | Field gun | 4 units | | In use between 1943–. Modified 107 K 10 guns. |

==== Heavy field guns (130–155 mm) ====
| Model | Origin | Type | Quantity | Image | Details |
|---|---|---|---|---|---|
| 155 K (93) | Finland | Field gun | 1 unit | | In use between 1993– |
| 155 K (91) | Finland | Field gun | 1 unit | | In use between 1991– |
| 155 K (88) | Finland | Field gun | 1 unit | | In use between 1988– |
| 155 K 74 | Finland | Field gun | | | In use between 1981– |
| 155 K 68 | Finland | Field gun | 13 units | | In use between 1970s–. |
| 155 K 17 | France | Field gun | 12 units | | In use between 1941 and 1944 |
| 152 KH X 67 | Finland | Field gun | 2 units | | In use between 1967– |
| 130 K 90-60 | Finland | Field gun | 15 units | | Modernized 122 K 60. In use between 1990–. |
| 130 K 54 | Soviet Union | Field gun | 322 units | | 156 from the Soviet Union 1965–1973, and another 166 in 1993 from Germany after the unification. In use between 1965 and 2019. |

=== Howitzers ===
==== Medium howitzers (105–122 mm) ====
| Model | Origin | Type | Quantity | Image | Details |
|---|---|---|---|---|---|
| 122 H 38 | Soviet Union | Howitzer | 41 units | | In use between 1942 and 1975 |
| 122 H 10-30 | Soviet Union (Germany) | Howitzer | 247 units | | In use between 1939–. |
| 122 H 10 later modernized to 122 H 10-40 | (Soviet Union) | Howitzer | 39 units | | In use between 1918–. |
| 122 H 09-30 | Finland (Soviet Union) | Howitzer | 25 units | | In use between 1939–. |
| 122 H 09 later modernized to 122 H 09-40 | Soviet Union | Howitzer | 31 units | | In use between 1918–. |
| 120 H 13 | Belgium | Howitzer | 13 units | | In use between 1940–. |
| 120 H 05 | | Howitzer | | | In use between 1918 and 1944. |
| 120 MH 01 | German Empire | Howitzer | 2 units | | In use between 1918–. |
| 114 H 18 | United Kingdom | Howitzer | 54 units | | In use between 1939–. Later used in the BT-42 assault gun. |
| 105 H 41-18 | Czechoslovakia | Howitzer | 1 unit | | In use between 1941 and the 1960s. |
| 105 H 41 | Czechoslovakia | Howitzer | 27 units | | In use between 1941 and the 1960s. |
| 105 H 37 | Sweden | Howitzer | 134 units | | License manufactured Swedish 10,5 cm fälthaubits L/22, 134 units, all modified into 105 H 37-40 in the 1960s, and into 105 H 61-37 in 1961. 40 were given to Estonia. In use between 1942–1990s. |
| 105 H 33-40 | Germany | Howitzer | 8 units | | In use between 1944–. |
| 105 H 33 | Germany | Howitzer | 53 units | | In use between 1944–. |
| 105 H 36-09 | | Howitzer | | | |
| 105 VH 10 | Sweden | Mountain howitzer | 4 units | | In use between 1940 and 1944. |

==== Heavy howitzers (150–155 mm) ====
| Model | Origin | Type | Quantity | Image | Details |
|---|---|---|---|---|---|
| 155 H 17, 12 units later modified to 152 H 15-17 | France | Howitzer | 151 units | | Canon de 155 C modèle 1917 Schneider. 12 were rebarreled to 152mm in 1944 and thereafter known as 152 H 15-17. In use between 1920s–1980s |
| 155 H 15 | France | Howitzer | 24 units | | In use between 1939–1960s |
| 152 H 88-40 | Finland (Germany) | Howitzer | 42 units | | A modernized German 15 cm sFH 18 howitzer fitted with a new 152 mm barrel. Original Finnish designation 150 H 40. In use between 1988 and 2007 |
| 152 H 88-37 | Finland (Soviet Union) | Howitzer | 64 units | | A modernized Soviet 152 mm ML-20 howitzer fitted with a new barrel. Original Finnish designation 152 H 37. In use between 1988 and 2007 |
| 152 H 88-31 | Finland (Soviet Union) | Howitzer | 21 units | | A modernized Soviet 122mm A-19 gun converted to a howitzer by fitting a new 152 mm L/32 barrel. Finnish Army designation for the original A-19 version was 122 K 31. In use between 1988 and 2007 |
| 152 H 55 | Soviet Union | Howitzer | 126 units | | Soviet 152 mm towed D-20 howitzer bought from ex-East German stocks. In use between 1991 and 2017. |
| 152 H 38 | Soviet Union | Howitzer | 102 units | | Four were later modified into the 152 H 38M. In use between 1941–. |
| 152 H 37-31<<check>> | Soviet Union | Howitzer | | | Modernized 122 K 31 guns. |
| 152 H 37 | Soviet Union | Howitzer | 66 units | | Later modernized into the 152 H 37 A and 152 H 88-37A. In use between 1942 and 1988. |
| 152 H 30 | Soviet Union | Howitzer | 1 unit | | Experimental gun, captured in the Continuation War. In use between 1941 and 1944. |
| 152 H 17 | Soviet Union | Howitzer | 8 units | | In use between 1924–. |
| 152 H 15 | Soviet Union | Howitzer | 4 units | | In use between 1924–. |
| 152 H 09-30 | Soviet Union | Howitzer | 109 units | | In use between 1939–1980s. |
| 152 H 10 | Russian Empire | Howitzer | 9 units | | In use between 1918 and 1966. |
| 150 H 40 | Germany | Howitzer | 48 units | | 42 units were later modernized into the 152 H 88-40. In use between 1940 and 1988. |
| 150 H 15 | Germany | Howitzer | 20 units | | In use between 1940 and 1962. |
| 155 H 15 and 155 H 10-30<<check>> | Soviet Union | Howitzer | About 232 units | | In use between 1939–1960s |
| 150 H 14 J | Japan | Howitzer | 12 units | | In use between 1918 and 1939. |
| 150 H 06 | Sweden | Howitzer | 12 units | | In use between 1940 and 1944. |

==== Super-heavy howitzers (203–210 mm) ====
| Model | Origin | Quantity | Image | Details |
|---|---|---|---|---|
| 203 H/17 | United States (British design) | 32 units | | 8-in. Howitzer Mk 7 (Vickers Mk 6).; In use between 1940–1960s. |
| 210 H/17 | Sweden (German design) | 4 units | | 21 cm Mörser 16.; In use between 1939–1960s. |

=== Infantry guns ===
| Model | Origin | Type | Quantity | Image | Details |
|---|---|---|---|---|---|
| 37 K 14 37 K 15 | Russian Empire | Trench gun | 40 units | | Russian trench gun |
| 76 LK/10/13 | Soviet Union | Mountain gun | 72 units | | In use between 1918–. |
| 76 RK/27 76 RK/27-39 | Soviet Union | Field gun | 235 units | | In use between 1939–. Also used as an anti-tank gun. |
| 76 K/27-k | Soviet Union | Field gun | 13 units | | In use between 19 and 19 |
| 76 RK/27-38 | Soviet Union | Field gun | 1 units | | In use between 1941–. |

=== Mortars ===
==== Super-heavy mortars (160–300 mm) ====
| Model | Origin | Type | Quantity | Image | Details |
|---|---|---|---|---|---|
| 300 KRH 42 | Finland | Mortar | 6 units | | In use between 1942 and 1945. |
| 160 KRH 58C | Finland | Mortar | 60 units | | In use between 1985–. |

==== Heavy mortars (120 mm) ====
| Model | Origin | Type | Quantity | Image | Details |
|---|---|---|---|---|---|
| 120 KRH 85 | Finland | Mortar | 60 units | | In use between 1985 and 2015. |
| 120 KRH 73 | Finland | Mortar | | | In use between 1973–. |
| 120 KRH 65 Y 120 KRH 65-73 | Finland | Mortar | 15 units | | The 120 KRH 65-73 was in use from 1974. It was developed into the 120 KRH 85, which is still in use today. |
| 120 KRH 62A-H | Finland | Mortar | | | In use between 1965–. Developed into the Israeli K6, US M120 and M121. |
| 120 KRH 40 | Finland | Mortar | 377 units | | In use between 1940 until about 2000. Modernized units are known as 120 KRH 40-76 |
| 120 KRH 38 | Soviet Union | Mortar | About 250 units | | In use between 1938 and 2004. Modernized units are known as 120 KRH 38-42, 120 KRH 38-77 and 120 KRH 38-42-77. These have also been retired. |

==== Medium mortars (81–107 mm) ====
| Model | Origin | Type | Quantity | Image | Details |
|---|---|---|---|---|---|
| 107mm M1938 mortar | Soviet Union | Mortar | 1 unit | | Several were captured during WW2 but only one in working condition. Only studied, never in operational use. |
| 82 KRH 41 | Soviet Union | Mortar | 478 units | | In use between 1941–. |
| 82 KRH 38 | Soviet Union | Mortar | | | |
| 82 KRH 37 | Soviet Union | Mortar | | | In use between 1937–. |
| 82 KRH 36 | Soviet Union | Mortar | | | |
| 81 KRH 97 | Finland | Mortar | 4 units | | In test use between 1997–2000s. Also known as 81 COM 97. Currently on display in museums. |
| 81 KRH 90 | Finland | Mortar | | | In use between 1990–. |
| 81 KRH 71 RT | Finland | Mortar | 14 units (81 KRH 71 RT) | | There were a coastal fortress variant called 81 KRH 71 RT, which is no longer in service, while infantry variant 81 KRH 71 Y is still in use alongside its modernised counterpart 81 KRH 71 96. The 81 KRH 71 Y mortar is also installed on Bv 206 vehicles. In use between 1971–. |
| 81 KRH 64 Y | Finland | Mortar | 10 units | | In use between 1964 and 1985. |
| 81 KRH 56 Y 81 KRH 58P | Finland | Mortar | 20 units | | First Finnish 81 mm mortar with a circular baseplate. The 58P was a long-barreled version. In use between 1956 and 1985. |
| 81 KRH 53 | | Mortar | | | |
| 81 KRH 42 | Finland | Mortar | 24 units | | Finnish short-barreled 81 mm mortar model 1942. In use between 1942–. |
| 81 KRH 39 | United Kingdom | Mortar | 10 units | | 10 units and 10,000 shells were given to Finland by the UK in 1940 but due to its different operation and small numbers it was never taken into use. They were sold in the 1960s. |
| 81 KRH 38 | Finland | Mortar | 231 units | | The 81 kranaatinheitin m/38 is a Finnish mortar designed and manufactured by Oy Tampella Ab. Introduced in 1938, it did not see combat until the Lapland War, where it was used in small numbers. It was later modernized during the Cold War under the designation 81 Krh 38 Y, remaining in service until 2007. |
| 81 KRH 36 | Poland | Mortar | 9 units (m/30) 6 units (m/36) | | Polish Brandt-type mortar. Later modernized and renamed 81 KRH 36 T 71 Y. In use between 1940 and 2015. |
| 81 KRH 36 | France | Mortar | 227 units | | Later modernized and renamed 81 KRH 36 Y. In use between 1936–. |
| 81 KRH 36 | Italy | Mortar | 109 units | | Later modernized and renamed 81 KRH 36 Y. In use between 1936–. |
| 81 KRH 35 | Finland | Mortar | 68 units | | Short-barreled 81 mm mortar model 1935. In use between 1935–. |
| 81 KRH 35 | Finland | Mortar | 187 units | | Long-barreled 81 mm mortar model 1935. In use between 1935 and 2015. It was modified several times, with new base plates, e.g. 81 KRH 35-60 and 81 KRH 35 T 71 |
| 81 KRH 34 | Sweden | Mortar | 25 units | | In use between 1939 and 1986. After WW2 they were altered to fire around the entire plate, and were given a "Y" designation (81 KRH 34Y) |
| 81 KRH 33 | Finland | Mortar | 104 units | | In use between 1933 and 1986. |
| 81 KRH 32 | Finland | Mortar | 70 units | | In use between 1932 and 1986. |
| 81 KRH 31 | France | Mortar | 100 units | | In use between 1940–. |
| 81 KRH 30 | Poland | Mortar | 16 units | | In use between 1930–. |
| 81 KRH 26 | United Kingdom | Mortar | 90 units | | In use from 1926 until 1936. |

==== Light mortars (47–60 mm) ====
| Model | Origin | Type | Quantity | Image | Details |
|---|---|---|---|---|---|
| 60 KRH 97 | Finland | Mortar | 5 units | | In test use between 1997–2000s. Also known as 60 COM 97. Currently on display in museums. |
| 60 TAM 18 | Finland | Mortar | Few units | | Some sold for testing to Sweden. |
| 60 TAM 15 | Finland | Mortar | 4 units | | In test use between 1970s–1980s. |
| 60 KRH 39 | Finland | Mortar | Only a few units | | In use between 1939–. |
| 50 KRH ss-I 50 KRH ss-IV | Soviet Union | Mortar | 50 units 30 units | | |
| 50 KRH 40 50 KRH 39 50 KRH 38 | Soviet Union | Mortar | 1,268 units | | In use between 1939 and 1959. |
| 47 KRH 41 | Finland | Mortar | 50 units | | In use between 1941 and 1948. |
| 47 KRH 40 | Sweden | Mortar | Only a few units | | In use between 1940–. |
| 47 KRH 39 | Finland | Mortar | 6 units | | In use between 1939 and 1960. |

=== Multiple rocket launchers ===
| Model | Origin | Quantity | Image | Details |
|---|---|---|---|---|
| 122 Rkh/76 | Soviet Union | 34 units | | BM-21 Grad. In use between 1976–2000s. |
| 150 Rkh/41 | Germany | 15 units | | 15 cm Nebelwerfer 41. Delivered in 1944, but never used operationally. |
| 280 Rkh/43 | Finland | 2 prototypes | | Tested, but cancelled in October 1944. |

=== Railroad artillery ===
| Model | Origin | Quantity | Image | Details |
|---|---|---|---|---|
| 305/52 ORaut | Soviet Union | 3 units | | Soviet TM-3-12 railroad guns. In use 1943–1944. |
| 180/57 NRaut | Soviet Union | 4 units | | Soviet TM-1-180 guns. In use 1941–1944. |
| 152/45 ORaut | Soviet Union | 4 units | | In use 1924–1964. |
| 130/50 ORaut | Soviet Union | units | | In use 1964–1972. |

=== Self-propelled artillery ===
| Model | Origin | Quantity | Image | Details |
|---|---|---|---|---|
| 152 TELAK 91 | Soviet Union | 18 units | | 2S5 Giatsint-S. In use between 1991 and 2015. |

=== Siege artillery ===
==== Siege guns ====
| Model | Origin | Type | Quantity | Image | Details |
|---|---|---|---|---|---|
| 279 M 77 | Russian Empire | Coastal mortar | 5 units | | 11-inch siege mortar, model 1877. In use between 1918 and 1951. |
| 229 M 77 | Russian Empire | Coastal mortar | 6 units | | 9-inch siege mortar, model 1877. In use between 1919 and 1944. |
| 155 K 77 | France | Siege artillery | 48 units | | In use between 1940 and 1944. |
| 152 K 04-200 p | Russian Empire | Siege artillery | 4 units | | In use between 1918 and 1944. |
| 152 K 77-190 p | Russian Empire | Siege artillery | 81 units | | In storage only. In use between 1918–. |
| 152 K 77-120 p | Russian Empire | Siege artillery | 102 units | | In use between 1918 and 1944. |
| 120 K 78 | France | Siege artillery | 102 units | | In use between 1940 and 1944. |
| 107 K 77-piirk | Russian Empire | Siege artillery | 57 units | | In use between 1918–1940s. |
| 107 K 77-ptrik | Russian Empire | Field gun | 102 units | | In use between 1918–. |
| 90 K 77 | France | Field gun | 100 units | | In use between 1940 and 1944. |
| 87 K 95 and 87 K 95-R | Russian Empire | Field gun | 87 units | | In use between 1918 and 1941. |
| 87 K 77 | Russian Empire | Field gun | 144 units | | In use between 1918–1930s. |
| 80 K 77 | France | Field gun | 12 units | | In use between 1940 and 1951. |

==== Siege mortars ====
| Model | Origin | Type | Quantity | Image | Details |
|---|---|---|---|---|---|
| 25 cm schwerer Minenwerfer | German Empire | Trench mortar | 2 units | | Sold in 1937 |
| 170 MH 12 | German Empire | Trench mortar | 6 units | | In use between 1918 and 1937. |
| 91 MH 16 | Russian Empire | Trench mortar | 26 units | | In use between 1918 and 1937. |
| 76 MH 16 | German Empire | Trench mortar | 26 units | | In use between 1918 and 1937. |

== Infantry weapons ==
=== Handguns ===
| Model | Origin | Type | Quantity | Image | Details |
|---|---|---|---|---|---|
| 7.63 PIST SOV | Soviet Union | Semi-automatic pistol | | | |
| 11,5 mm Colt | United States | Semi-automatic pistol | 134 units | | |
| 7.65 PIST m/23 9.00 PIST m/08 | Germany | Semi-automatic pistol | 8,000 units | | |
| 9.00 PIST 35 | Finland | Semi-automatic pistol | 9,000 units | | |
| Mauser C96 | German Empire | Semi-automatic pistol | 1,000+ units | | |
| Dreyse M/15 | German Empire | Semi-automatic pistol | 55 | | |
| Mauser M1914 | German Empire | Semi-automatic pistol | 500 units | | |
| 7.62 REV Nagant | Russian Empire | Revolver | 1,400 units | | |
| Ruby pistol | Spanish State | Semi-automatic pistol | 10,000 units | | |
| 7.65 M/Walther 4 | Germany | Semi-automatic pistol | 326 units | | |
| 7.65 mm M/Beholla | German Empire | Semi-automatic pistol | 100 units | | |
| 7.65 mm M/Sauer | German Empire | Semi-automatic pistol | Units | | The image is of a M1919 6.35 mm while the M1914 was in 7.65 mm. The external resemblance is similar. |
| Astra 400 | Spanish State | Semi-automatic pistol | 100 units | | |
| 7.65 mm Browning m/1900 | Belgium | Semi-automatic pistol | 1,000 units | | |
| Pistols M/03 FN | Belgium | Semi-automatic pistol | 860+ units | | 860 left behind by Swedish volunteers. A few FN 1903s were captured from Russia after independence |
| Pistol M/07 Husqvarna | Sweden | Semi-automatic pistol | 860+ units | | 860 left behind by Swedish volunteers. A few FN 1903s were captured from Russia after independence |
| 7.65 PIST 10 FN 7.65 PIST 22 FN | Belgium | Semi-automatic pistol | 2,500 units 2,500 units | | |
| 9.00 PIST FN | Belgium | Semi-automatic pistol | 2,400 units | | |
| 7.65 PIST 15 Beretta | Italy | Semi-automatic pistol | 1,500 units | | |
| 7.65 PIST 19 Beretta | Italy | Semi-automatic pistol | See above | | |
| 9.00 PIST 34 Beretta | Italy | Semi-automatic pistol | 1,500 units | | |
| 7.65 PIST 35 Beretta | Italy | Semi-automatic pistol | 4,090 units | | |
| 9.00 PIST 23 | Czechoslovakia | Semi-automatic pistol | 3,285 units | | |
| 7.65 PIST 39 | Czechoslovakia | Semi-automatic pistol | | | |
| 9.00 PIST 39 | Czechoslovakia | Semi-automatic pistol | 1,700 units | | |
| 7.65 Bayard M/1908 | Belgium | Semi-automatic pistol | | | |
| Ortgies Semi-Automatic Pistol | Germany | Semi-automatic pistol | Several hundred units | | |

=== Submachine guns ===
| Weapon | | Origin | Quantity (units) | Image | Service | Details |
| Designation | Model | Origin | Quantity (units) | Image | Service | Details |
Submachine guns
| | Neuhausen MKMS | Switzerland | 282 | | | |
| 7.63 KP 38 | PPD-34 PPD-34/38 | Soviet Union | | | | Captured from Soviet troops, issued to Finnish coastal troops and troops stationed in home front during Continuation War. |
| 7.63 KP 40 | PPD-40 | Soviet Union | 150 | | | Captured from Soviet troops, issued to Finnish coastal troops and troops stationed in home front during Continuation War. |
| 7.63 KP 41 | PPSh-41 | Soviet Union | 2,500 | | 1942 – 1944 | Captured from Soviet troop, only used by Finnish frontline-troops until running out of ammo and only small amount were used by Finnish home front troops. |
| 7.63 KP 43 | PPS-42 | Soviet Union | A few hundred | | | |
| 7.63 KP 43 | PPS-43 | Soviet Union | A few hundred | | | |
| 7.65 KP Bergmann | Bergmann M/20 | Switzerland | 1,523 | | | Finnish Civil Guard (Suojeluskunta) acquired these submachine guns and used them in between 1922 – 1939. During the Winter War, the great majority of Suojeluskunta weaponry was transferred to Finnish Army, among them these submachine guns were issued to Finnish Army front-line troops. During the Continuation War, coastal troops and home-front troops used them. |
| 9.00 KP Schmeisser | MP 28 | Nazi Germany | 171 | | | Acquired from Belgium in the spring of 1940. Issued to Finnish troops located in Lapland, home-front troops and supplies units during the Continuation War. |
| 9.00 KP 40 | MP 38 | Germany | 150–160 | | | Delivered alongside German vehicles during the Continuation War. Saw some combat use with the vehicle crews of the vehicles they had been delivered with. |
| 9.00 KP 40 | MP 40 | Germany | 150–160 | | | Delivered alongside German vehicles during the Continuation War. Saw some combat use with the vehicle crews of the vehicles they had been delivered with. |
| | Suomi KP/31 | Finland | 80,000 | | | |
| | KP m/44 | Finland | 10,400 | | | |
| 9.00 KP Sten II | Sten Mk II | United Kingdom | 76,115 | | | |
| 9.00 KP Sten III | Sten Mk III | United Kingdom | 76,115 | | | |

=== Assault rifles ===
| Model | Origin | Type | Quantity | Image | Details |
|---|---|---|---|---|---|
| 7.62 RK 54 TP 7.62 RK 54 | Soviet Union | Assault rifle | 26.000 units | | |
| 7.62 RK 72 | East Germany | Assault rifle | Units | | |

=== Service rifles ===
| Model | Origin | Type | Quantity | Image | Details |
|---|---|---|---|---|---|
| Berdan M1870 | Soviet Union | Service rifle | 3,100 units | | |
| Carcano M91/38 | Italy | Bolt action rifle | 74,000 units | | In use 1940–1950s. |
| Type 30 rifle | Japan | Bolt action rifle | 10,500 units | | |
| Type 35 rifle Type 38 rifle | Japan | Bolt action rifle | 7,000+ units | | |
| Mannlicher M1895 | Austria-Hungary | Bolt action rifle | 2,300 units | | |
| Mannlicher M1888 | Austria-Hungary | Bolt action rifle | Units | | |
| AVS-36 | Soviet Union | Automatic rifle | Hundreds of units | | |
| SVT-38 SVT-40 | Soviet Union | Semi-automatic rifle | 20,000 units | | |
| 7.62 KIV M/91 7.62 KIV M/91 RV 7.62 KIV M/07 Karab. 7.62 KIV M/91-24 7.62 KIV M/27 7.62 KIV M/27 RV 7.62 KIV M/28 7.62 KIV M/28-30 7.62 KIV M/39 7.62 KIV M/91-30 7.62 KIV M/38 7.62 KIV M/44 | Russian Empire Russian Empire Russian Empire Finland Finland Finland Finland Finland Finland Soviet Union Soviet Union Soviet Union | Bolt action rifle | 210,000 units Few units Few units 26,000 units 56,000 units 2,200 units 33,000 units 40,000 units 100,000 units 100,000+ units 2,291 units see above | | |
| Winchester Model 1895 | United States | Lever-action rifle | | | |
| 7.92 KIV/98 rv | German Empire | Bolt action rifle | 8,000 units | | |
| 7.92 KIV SAKSAL | Germany | Bolt action rifle | 600 units | | |
| 6.50 KIV/96 | Sweden | Bolt action rifle | 77,000 units | | |

=== Heavy automatic weapons ===
| Weapon | | Origin | Qty.^{(units)} | Image | Service | Details |
| Designation | Model | Origin | Qty.^{(units)} | Image | Service | Details |
Light machine guns
| 6.50 PK 21 | Kg m/21 | Sweden | ~220 (Note: During the Continuation War (1941 – 1944).) | | 1940 – 1958 | During the Winter War, these were used by Finnish troops defending Lapland and the Swedish Volunteer Corps (SFK). After Germany occupied Denmark and Norway in 1940, 105 guns were returned to Sweden due to worries of a possible German invasion of Sweden. During the Continuation War, they mainly saw use with Coastal Troops. In 1958, the remaining guns were sold to Interarmco and exported. |
| 7.50 PK 24-29 (Note: Unofficial designation for the FM 24/29 based on Finnish name schemes for machine guns, such as the 7.92 PK 08-15 (Maxim MG 08/15).) | Chatellerault M/24-29 | France | 100 | | 1940 – 1960 | Donated by France during Winter War, arriving too late to actually see any action. During the Continuation War, they were issued to home front troops, who used them as training weapons. 60 guns were scrapped in 1944, while the remaining ones were sold to Interarmco and exported. |
| 7.62 KVKK 54 RPD | RPD M/54 | Soviet Union | 1,000 | | | |
| 7.62 PK 20 | Madsen M/20 | Denmark | 729 (Note: Peak number of Madsen M/20 guns in late 1928.) | | 1921 – 1936 | Small number of guns saw use in the Finnish Civil War. After the war, the Finnish Army issued the guns to cavalry and bicycle units, but later also to infantry. The Finnish military sold almost all remaining guns to Estonia in 1937. (Note: 612 Madsen M/20 LMGs were sold, and presumably had been modified to .303 British cartridge for Estonian service. A small number remained in Finnish inventory saw no service in World War II, with the last 60 guns were sold to Interarmco between 1959–1960.) |
| 7.62 PK 26 | Lahti-Saloranta M/26 | Finland | 6,200 | | | |
| 7.62 PK D | Degtyaryov M/27 | Soviet Union | 9,000 | | | |
| 7.62 PK D PSV | Degtyaryov M/27 PSV | Soviet Union | 650+ | | | |
| 7.62 PK Lewis | Lewis Mk I | Soviet Union | 60 | | | |
| 7.70 PK Lewis | Lewis Mk I | United Kingdom | 60 | | | |
| 7.92 PK FN | FN Model D | Belgium | 700 | | | |
| 8.00 PK 15 | Chauchat M/15 | France | 5,000 | | 1941 – 1955 | Donated by France during the Winter War, only issued in the Continuation War. |
Machine guns
| 6.5 KK 14 | Schwarzlose M/14 (Note: Swedish Kulspruta m/1914 in 6.5×55mm.) | Sweden | 70 | | | Used by Swedish Volunteer Corps (SFK) during Winter War and some Finnish units until early 1944 during Continuation War. |
| 7.62 KK 95-14 (Note: The Finnish designation was the 7.62 KK 1895 (or more informally as the Colt-Browning M/1895).) | Colt-Browning M/95-14 | United States | 184 (Note: The number of Colt-Browning M/95-14 remaining in the Finnish military's inventory in 1936, originally 200 guns were captured.) | | | Saw use with both sides during Finnish Civil War. Briefly used by Finnish Army in 1918 – 1919, then transferred to Finnish Civil Guard (Suojeluskunta). They remained in Civil Guard use until sold and exported in 1936. |
| 7.62 KK 09-09 | Maxim M/09-09 (Maxim M1905) | Russian Empire | ~4,000 (Note: Recorded on June 1st 1944.) | | 1918 – 1960s (Note: Put in storage until the 1990s.) | Small amount used by both sides in Finnish Civil War of 1918. Typically were in secondary use between the wars. During World War II they were mostly issued to stationary roles (fortifications, anti-aircraft weapons,...). |
| 7.62 KK 09-09 | Maxim M/09-09 (Maxim M1910) | Russian Empire; USSR | ~4,000 | | 1918 – 1960s | Many were obtained as war booty during WW2. In use from 1918 until the 1960s, mothballed until the 1990s. |
| 7.62 KK 09-21 | Maxim M/09-21 | Finland | >1,000 | | 1921 – 1960s | |
| 7.62 KK 32-33 | Maxim M/32-33 | Finland | ~1,200 | | 1933 – 1960s | |
| 7.62 KK 39 | DS-39 | Soviet Union | ~200 | | 1941 – 1944 | Captured by Finnish troops (mostly in 1941). During Continuation War issued to Finnish frontline troops. |
| 7.62 KK L-41 | Sampo L-41 | Finland | 35 | | | Prototypes were manufactured in 1940 – 1942. Small series of guns were issued for field tests to frontline infantry units in 1942, remaining in combat use with those units until end of Continuation War. Never issued to military use in large scale and no mass-production. |
| 7.62 KK 42 | MG 42 | Germany | 6 | | | Plans were made to build 4,000 units but machining complications and the end of the war put an end to this. |
| 7.62 KK Vickers | Vickers Mk I | Soviet Union | 100+ | | | Vickers from various sources (chambered in 7.62×54mmR and .303 British) were acquired from 1920 and 100 were also delivered by United Kingdom during Winter war. |
| 7.70 KK Vickers | Vickers Mk I | United Kingdom | 100+ | | | Vickers from various sources (chambered in 7.62×54mmR and .303 British) were acquired from 1920 and 100 were also delivered by United Kingdom during Winter war. |
| 7.92 KK 08 | Maxim M/08 | Germany | 1,098 | | | |
| 7.92 PK 08-15 (Note: In the Finnish Army, despite being a light machine gun, these were used more like a regular machine gun.) | Maxim M/08-15 | Germany | 340 (Note: Finnish military's inventory in 1929.) | | | Used by German Baltic Sea Division (Ostsee Division) in Finnish Civil War, with few dozen remained after. Finland bought additional 350 guns from France in 1919. All were sold abroad around 1931 – 1933 and no longer in Finnish use during World War II. |
| 7.92 PK 08-18 | Maxim M/08-18 | Germany | 112 | | | Used by German Baltic Sea Division (Ostsee Division) in Finnish Civil War, with few dozen remained after. Finland bought additional 350 guns from France in 1919. All were sold abroad around 1931 – 1933 and no longer in Finnish use during World War II. |
| 8.00 KK 14 | Hotchkiss M/14 | France | 34 | | | Used with Renault FT tanks. In 1937, the Finnish Army replaced the Hotchkiss MGs with the Maxim M/09-31, with the last remaining 20 Hotchkiss machine guns were sold to Transbaltic Oy and exported in the same year. |
Automatic grenade launchers
| 30 KRKK AGS-17 | AGS-17 | Soviet Union | 140 | | 1990s – 2005 | |

== Anti-aircraft weapons ==
=== Anti-aircraft guns ===
| Weapon | | Origin | Mount | Qty.^{(units)} | Image | Service | Details |
| Designation | Model | Origin | Mount | Qty.^{(units)} | Image | Service | Details |
Anti-aircraft machine guns
| 7.62 ItKK/09-09 | Maxim M/09-09 | Soviet Union | | ~4,000 | | 1925 – 1944 | |
| 7.62 ItKK/09-21 | Maxim M/09-21 | Finland | | | | 1925 – 1944 | |
| 7.62 ItKK/32-33 | Maxim M/32-33 | Finland | | | | 1925 – 1944 | |
| 7.62 ItKK/09-31 | Maxim M/09-31 | Soviet Union | | 80+ | | | Soviet quadruple 7.62 mm Maxim machinegun M1931 |
| 7.62 ItKK/31 VKT | Maxim M/31 VKT | Finland | | 135 | | | |
| 7.62 ItKK/31-40 VKT | Maxim M/31-40 VKT | Finland | | 475 | | | |
| 7.62 ITPK DA-2 | DA-28 | Soviet Union | | | | | Aircraft variant of the Soviet Degtyaryov machine gun. Many were taken into use as AA-rifles. |
| 7.62 ItKK L-33/36 | | Finland | | 130 | | | Mainly used on small craft in the Finnish Navy |
| 8.00 ItKK/36 | Ksp m/36 | Sweden | | 4 | | | |
Light anti-aircraft guns (20 – 30 mm)
| 20 ItK/23 | 20 mm Oerlikon M/23 | Switzerland | Fixed | 4 | | 1924 – 1941 | |
| 20 ItK/30 M | 20 mm Madsen M/30 | Denmark | Fixed | 6 | | 1930 – 1980s | In total there were 362 cannons in use. |
| 20 ItK/36 M | 20 mm Madsen M/36 | Denmark | | 32 | | 1930 – 1980s | In total there were 362 cannons in use. |
| 20 ItK/36-44 M | 20 mm Madsen M/36-44 | Denmark | | 32 | | 1930 – 1980s | In total there were 362 cannons in use. |
| 20 ItK/36 M2 | 20 mm Madsen M/36 | Denmark | Fixed | 1 | | 1930 – 1980s | In total there were 362 cannons in use. |
| 20 ItK/39 M | 20 mm Madsen M/39 | Denmark | | 56 | | 1930 – 1980s | In total there were 362 cannons in use. |
| 20 ItK/39-44 M | 20 mm Madsen M/39-44 | Denmark | | 56 | | 1930 – 1980s | In total there were 362 cannons in use. |
| 20 ItK/40 M | 20 mm Madsen M/40 | Denmark | | 146 | | 1930 – 1980s | In total there were 362 cannons in use. |
| 20 ItK/42 M | 20 mm Madsen M/42 | Denmark | | 50 | | 1930 – 1980s | In total there were 362 cannons in use. |
| 20 ItK/43 M | 20 mm Madsen M/43 | Denmark | | 71 | | 1930 – 1980s | In total there were 362 cannons in use. |
| 20 ItK/30 BSW | 20 mm FlaK 30 | Germany | Mobile | 50 | | 1939 – 1960s | In storage until the 1990s. |
| 20 ItK/38 BSW | 20 mm FlaK 38 | Germany | Mobile | 113 | | 1939 – 1960s | In storage until the 1990s. |
| 20 ItK/35 | 20 mm Breda M/35 | Italy | | 88 | | | |
| 20 ItK/40 VKT | 20 mm VKT M/40 | Finland | | 180 | | 1943 – 1980s | |
| 20 TorKK MG-151 | 20 mm MG-151/20 | Germany | | | | | |
| 20 ItK/OE | 20 mm Oerlikon | Switzerland | Mobile | 2 | | | Swiss Oerlikon 20 mm anti-aircraft gun bought in 1963 and used until 1975 for testing purposes. The name used during the testing was 20 ItK/Oe / 10 ILa / 5 TG. |
| 20 ItK/HS | 20 mm Hispano HS.820 | Switzerland | Mobile | 2 | | | Swiss Hispano-Suiza 20 mm anti-aircraft gun bought in 1963 and used until 1972 for testing purposes. The name used during the testing was 20 ItK/HS / HS 669 / HS 820 L 85. |
| 30 ItK/61 HS | 30 mm Hispano M/61 | Switzerland | Mobile | 3 | | | Swiss Hispano-Suiza 30 mm anti-aircraft gun bought in 1962. |
| 30 ItK/62 | 30 mm Hispano M/62 | Switzerland | Mobile | 27 | | | Swiss Hispano-Suiza 30 mm anti-aircraft gun bought in 1962. |
Medium anti-aircraft guns (35 – 57 mm)
| 35 ItK/58 | 35 mm Oerlikon M/58 (GDF-001) | Switzerland | Mobile | 16 | | | Finnish Army purchased 16 GDF-001 guns in 1958. The guns were modernized to the GDF-005 standard in 1988. |
| 35 ItK/88 | 35 mm Oerlikon M/88 (GDF-005) | Switzerland | Mobile | 16 | | | Finnish Army purchased 16 GDF-001 guns in 1958. The guns were modernized to the GDF-005 standard in 1988. |
| 37 ItK/Ma (Note: Finnish Navy designation is the 37/30 Ma.) | QF 1-pdr "Pom-Pom" | United Kingdom | | 16 | | 1918 – 1944 | |
| 37 ItK/37 | 3.7 cm FlaK 37 | Germany | Fixed (Note: AA Guns Part 2 (jaegerplatoon.net), p. 37 ItK/37) | 4 | | | Finnish military acquired four guns and 3,200 37 mm shells (37×263mmB) for them in September of 1944. The guns were in very poor shape they required repairs before they could be issued, but the war ended before completion of repairs. |
| 37 ItK/39 ss | 37 mm AZP obr. 1939 g. | Soviet Union | | 1 | | | Several Soviet 61-K 37 mm anti-aircraft gun were captured but only little ammunition, so only one gun was operational for a short time. In use in 1941. |
| 40 ItK/15 | 40 mm Vickers M/15 | United Kingdom | | 9 | | | 40 mm Pom-Pom gun |
| 40 ItK/35 B (Note: 40 mm Bofors guns recovered from the Netherlands (with either Swedish and/or Polish origins). It could be assumed that these guns were either the Swedish-made 40 mm Bofors Model 1936 and/or Polish-made 40 mm Bofors wz.36, both built to Dutch specifications.) | 40 mm Bofors M/36 | Netherlands (Note: While the 40 ItK/35 B were considered Dutch guns, they were either made in Poland or Sweden.) | Mobile | ~300 (Note: AA Guns Part 2 (jaegerplatoon.net), p. 40 ItK/35-39 B) | | 1938 – 1980s | Used by Finnish Army and Navy during World War II. |
| 40 ItK/36 B (Note: Swedish-made 40 mm Bofors Model 1934.) | 40 mm Bofors M/34 | Sweden | Mobile | ~300 | | 1938 – 1980s | Used by Finnish Army and Navy during World War II. |
| 40 ItK/36 BK2 (Note: Swedish 40 mm Bofors Model 1936 mounted in a twin-gun mounting for naval use.) | 40 mm Bofors M/36 (Naval use) | Sweden | Fixed | ~300 | | 1938 – 1980s | Used by Finnish Army and Navy during World War II. |
| 40 ItK/37 BK (Note: Swedish 40 mm Bofors Model 1936 mounted in a single-gun mounting for naval use.) | 40 mm Bofors M/36 (Naval use) | Sweden | Fixed | ~300 | | 1938 – 1980s | Used by Finnish Army and Navy during World War II. |
| 40 ItK/38 B (Note: Swedish 40 mm Bofors Model 1936 built under license by VTT in Finland.) | 40 mm Bofors M/36 | Finland | Mobile | ~300 | | 1938 – 1980s | Used by Finnish Army and Navy during World War II. |
| 40 ItK/38 U (Note: Swedish 40 mm Bofors Model 1936 built under license by built under licence by MÁVAG in Hungary as the 40 mm Bofors 36M.) | 40 mm Bofors M/36 | Hungary | Mobile | ~300 | | 1938 – 1980s | Used by Finnish Army and Navy during World War II. |
| 40 ItK/38 S | 40 mm Bofors M/36 | Germany | Mobile | ~300 | | 1938 – 1980s | Used by Finnish Army and Navy during World War II. |
| 40 ItK/39 B | 40 mm Bofors M/36 | Sweden | Mobile | ~300 | | 1938 – 1980s | Used by Finnish Army and Navy during World War II. |
| 57 ItK S-60 | 57 mm AZP S-60 | Soviet Union | | 24 | | 1960 – 2000 | Nicknamed "Nikolai". |
Heavy anti-aircraft guns (75 – 88 mm)
| 75 ItK/97-14 P | 75 mm Puteaux M/97-14 | France | Mobile | 24 | | 1941 – 1945 | |
| 75 ItK/30 BK | 75 mm Bofors M/30 | Sweden | Fixed | 9 | | | Swedish 75mm Bofors anti-aircraft gun originally manufactured for Siam. |
| 75 ItK/37 SK | 75 mm Skoda M/37 | Czechoslovakia | Mobile | 20 | | | In use from 1940 – 1945. |
| 76 ItK/14 | 76 mm Putilov M/14 | Russian Empire | Fixed | 2 | | | In use from 1918 – 1945. |
| 76 ItK 02/34 OH | 76 mm Obuhov M/02/34 | Russian Empire (Finnish Mod.) | Fixed | 8 | | 1930s – 1967 | |
| 76 ItK/27 BK | 76 mm Bofors M/27 | Sweden | Fixed | 8 | | 1927 – 1945 | |
| 76 ItK/28 B | 76 mm Bofors M/28 | Sweden | Mobile | 4 | | 1928 – 1945 | |
| 76 ItK/29 B | 76 mm Bofors M/29 | Sweden | Mobile | 4 | | 1929 – 1945 | |
| 76 ItK/34 V | 76 mm Vickers M/34 | United Kingdom | Mobile | 12 | | 1936 – 1945 | |
| 76 ItK/16-35 Br | 76 mm Breda M/16-35 | Italy | Fixed | 24 | | 1934 – 1972 | The guns were bought from Italy during the Winter War, arriving in February 1940. After that, they saw use with the Finnish Army during rest of Winter War and Continuation War. They were used to equip four fixed anti-aircraft gun batteries (Note: Each fixed anti-aircraft gun battery has 3 guns.) in home front. Starting from 1944, the guns were transferred to Coastal Artillery. |
| 76 ItK/16 V | 76 mm Vickers M/16 | United Kingdom | Fixed (Note: AA Guns Part 3 (jaegerplatoon.net), p. 76 mm ItK/16 V, Vickers) | 24 | | 1941 – 1945 | Donated by Great Britain during Winter War, but as the guns arrived not earlier than March of 1940 they were not issued. In the Continuation War, they were used by 7 heavy AA-batteries serving in home front. Even after the Finnish military stop using them as anti-aircraft guns, they were used as coastal artillery until the late 1980s. |
| 76 ItK/31 ss | 76 mm ZP obr. 1931 | Soviet Union | Mobile (Note: AA Guns Part 3 (jaegerplatoon.net), p. 76 ItK/31 ss and 76 ItK/31-40 ss) | 118 | | 1941 – 1970s | 46 guns were captured in the second half of 1941, an additional 72 guns were bought from Germany in 1944 for Coastal Artillery. The ones captured in 1941 used by Finnish Army and the ones bought used by Coastal Artillery during Continuation War. The ItK/31 was the more numerous one of the two in Finnish use. |
| 76 ItK/31-40 ss | 76 mm ZP obr. 1938 | Soviet Union | Mobile | 118 | | 1941 – 1970s | 46 guns were captured in the second half of 1941, an additional 72 guns were bought from Germany in 1944 for Coastal Artillery. The ones captured in 1941 used by Finnish Army and the ones bought used by Coastal Artillery during Continuation War. The ItK/31 was the more numerous one of the two in Finnish use. |
| 88 ItK/37 RMB | 8.8 cm FlaK 37 | Germany | Mobile (Note: AA Guns Part 3 (jaegerplatoon.net), p. 88 ItK/37 RMB and 88 ItK/37 RMBK "Rämäpää") | 18 | | 1943 – 1980 | 18 mobile guns bought in the spring of 1943, 72 fixed guns bought in summer of 1944. All of the guns were used in air-defense of Finland's most important cities. Unlike the Germans, the Finn did not use the 88mm anti-aircraft guns as anti-tank weapons, even if some APHE-ammunition had been acquired for them. Nicknamed "Rämäpää" (Daredevil) after abbreviation of its manufacturer RMB (Rheinmetall-Borsig). |
| 88 ItK/37 RMBK | 8.8 cm FlaK 37 | Germany | Fixed | 72 | | 1943 – 1980 | 18 mobile guns bought in the spring of 1943, 72 fixed guns bought in summer of 1944. All of the guns were used in air-defense of Finland's most important cities. Unlike the Germans, the Finn did not use the 88mm anti-aircraft guns as anti-tank weapons, even if some APHE-ammunition had been acquired for them. Nicknamed "Rämäpää" (Daredevil) after abbreviation of its manufacturer RMB (Rheinmetall-Borsig). |
| 88 ItK/39/43 ss | 8.5/8.8 cm FlaK 39(r) | Soviet Union; Germany | Mobile | 18 (Note: AA Guns Part 3 (jaegerplatoon.net), p. 88 ItK/39/43 ss) | | 1941 – 1977 | The 8.5/8.8 cm FlaK 39(r) was a German conversion of the Soviet 85mm anti-aircraft gun M1939 to use 88 mm ammunition by Germans, by re-boring the gun barrels and gun chamber. These guns were bought in 1944 for home front air-defense. |

=== Self-propelled anti-aircraft guns ===
Self-propelled anti-aircraft guns
| Model | Origin | Qty.^{(units)} | Image | Service | Details |
|---|---|---|---|---|---|
| ItPsv 41 | Sweden | 6 | | 1942 – 1966 | During the battles in the summer of 1944, the Finnish tanks downed eleven Soviet aircraft and thus prevented attacks against the tank brigade. All vehicles survived the Continuation War. |
| ItPsv 90 | United Kingdom | 7 | | 1990 – 2010 | British Marksman turret using two Oerlikon 35 mm autocannons mounted on a Polish T-55AM chassis. The turrets were moved to Leopard 2 chassis. |
| 57 ItPsv SU 57-2 | Soviet Union | 12 | | 1961 – 2006 | The Hungarian vehicles were modernized to the T-55A standard in and were given registration numbers starting with Ps 462, while the older Soviet ones had numbers starting with Ps 461.; 9 additional units were obtained from Hungary in the 1990s for upgrade purposes of the older chassis, but the entire programme was scrapped in 1999, when it was decided to end the modernization programmes of old Soviet equipment. |
| 57 ItPsv SU 57-2 | Hungary | 9 | | 1961 – 2006 | The Hungarian vehicles were modernized to the T-55A standard in and were given registration numbers starting with Ps 462, while the older Soviet ones had numbers starting with Ps 461.; 9 additional units were obtained from Hungary in the 1990s for upgrade purposes of the older chassis, but the entire programme was scrapped in 1999, when it was decided to end the modernization programmes of old Soviet equipment. |

=== Surface-to-air missile systems ===
| Model | Origin | Quantity | Image | Details |
Man-portable infrared homing surface-to-air missile
| ITO 78 | Soviet Union | ~122 launchers 1091 missiles | | Soviet SA-7b Grail (9K32 Strela-2) man-portable SAM missiles, in use between 1978 until 2000. |
| ITO 86 | Soviet Union | ~160 launchers 1558 missiles | | Soviet SA-16 Gimlet (9K310 Igla-1) man-portable SAM missiles, in use between 1986 and 2005. |
| ITO 86 M | Soviet Union | ~80 to 100 launchers 912 missiles | | Soviet SA-18 Grouse (9K38 Igla) man-portable SAM missiles, in use between 1994 and 2005. |
Medium range surface-to-air missiles
| Thunderbird | United Kingdom | 1 missile | | British surface-to-air missile obtained for familiarization and training purposes. |
| ITO 79 | Soviet Union | 3 batteries 400 missiles | | Soviet SA-3 Goa (S-125 Pechora) |
| ITO 96 | Soviet Union | 3 batteries totalling: 9 TELAR (9A310M1); 9 TEL reload vehicles (9M38M1); 3 TAR (9S18M1); 3 Command vehicles (9S470); 115 missiles (9M38M1) | | Soviet SA-11 Gadfly (9K37 BUK-M1) |

== Anti-tank weapons ==
=== Anti-tank rockets and missiles ===
| Weapon | | Origin | Qty. 1^{(units)} | Qty. 2^{(units)} | Image | Service | Details |
| Designation | Model | Origin | Qty. 1^{(units)} | Qty. 2^{(units)} | Image | Service | Details |
Anti-tank guided missiles
| PstOhj 62 | Vickers Vigilant | United Kingdom | 10 | 250 (Note: 100 missiles bought for training use.) | | 1962 – 1995 | The Finnish army's first missile. |
| PstOhj 82 | 9K111 Fagot (AT-4 Spigot) | Soviet Union | | | | 1982 - 2004 | |
| PstOhj 82M | 9M113 Konkurs (AT-5 Spandrel) | Soviet Union | | | | 1982 - 2004 | |
| PstOhj 83 | BGM-71C I-TOW | United States | | | | | |
| PstOhj 83M | BGM-71 TOW 2 | United States | | | | | |
| PstOhj 83MA | BGM-71E (TOW 2A) | United States | | 120 | | | |
| PstOhj 83MB | BGM-71F (TOW 2B) | United States | | 535 | | | |
Unguided anti-tank launchers
| 55 S 55 | | Finland | 10,000+ | | | 1955 – 1990s | Kept in storage until 2005. |
| 88 rakh/B 54 | Panzerschreck | Germany | 1,854 | | | 1944 – 1959 | |
Unguided anti-tank disposable launchers (Note: For disposable launchers, both the launcher and the projectile inside are counted as a single unit.)
| 66 KES 75 | M72A2 LAW | United States | 77,000+ | | | 1975 – 2014 | |
| 66 KES 88 | M72A5 LAW | United States | 77,000+ | | | 1988 – 2020 | |
| 68 KES | SARPAC | France | | | | | |
| 74 KES 68 | 74 mm Miniman M/68 | Sweden | | | | | |
| 100 pshp/F1 | Faustpatrone 30 | Germany | 25,812 | | | 1944 – 1959 | |
| 142 pshp/F2 | Panzerfaust 30 | Germany | 25,812 | | | 1944 – 1959 | |

=== Anti-tank guns ===
| Weapon | | Origin | Qty.^{(units)} | Image | Service | Details |
| Designation | Model | Origin | Qty.^{(units)} | Image | Service | Details |
Anti-tank rifles
| 8 pst kiv/38 | Kb ppanc wz. 35 | Poland | 30 | | | |
| 14 pst kiv/37 | Boys AT Rifle Mk I | United Kingdom | 300 | | | |
| 20 pst kiv/18-S | Solothurn S-18/154 | Switzerland | 12 | | 1941 – 1959 | Small number were used by Finnish front-line troops from 1941 to early 1944. After that few were issued to coastal troops. |
| 20 pst kiv/39 | Lahti L-39 | Finland | ~1,850 | | | |
| 20 it kiv/39-44 | Lahti L-39/44 | Finland | 325 | | 1944 – 1950s | Fully-automatic version of the Lahti L-39 anti-tank rifle. Mostly used as an anti-aircraft gun. |
| 20 pst kiv/41-D ss | PTRD-41 | Soviet Union | | | | |
| 20 pst kiv/41-S ss | PTRS-41 | Soviet Union | | | | |
Light anti-tank guns (20 – 37 mm)
| 20 PstK/40 Madsen | 20 mm Madsen M/40 | Denmark | 12–20 (Note: The 12 guns could have been the ones used on improvised sledge mounts, and the 20 guns were the dedicated anti-tank gun version mounted on a one-axle wheeled carriage.) | | 1940 – 1986 | During the Winter War, a few were used as antitank-guns with improvised sledge mounts. During the early part of the Continuation War, a small number with antitank / ground support gun carriages (one-axle wheeled mount) guns were used as antitank-guns. By March 1942, all anti-tank guns had been transferred to coastal troops. |
| 25 PstK/34 | 25 mm SA-L M^{le} 34 | France | 133 (Note: 133 m/34 guns and 104 m/37 guns) | | 1940 – 1943 | Nicknamed "Marianne" by Finnish troops. Less than 40 guns were used by Finnish frontline troops during last few weeks of Winter War. Another 200 bought during Interim Peace and used on the frontline during the early part of the Continuation War, until being replaced by more effective anti-tank guns in 1942 – 1943. After the war they were mothballed for possible further use until being declared obsolete in year 1959. The remaining 225 guns were sold to Interarmco that year and exported in year 1960. |
| 25 PstK/37 | 25 mm SA-L M^{le} 37 | France | 104 | | 1940 – 1943 | |
| 28 PstK/41 | 2.8 cm s.Pz.B 41 | Germany | 2 | | | In use in 1944. Sold in 1959. |
| 37 PstK/36 Bofors | | Finland | 355 | | | The Swedish Bofors 37mm anti-tank gun were procured both from Sweden, Finland and Poland. It was in use between 1938 until 1944. Sold in 1986. |
| 37 PstK/36 Bofors | | Poland | 42 | | | The Swedish Bofors 37mm anti-tank gun were procured both from Sweden, Finland and Poland. It was in use between 1938 until 1944. Sold in 1986. |
| 37 PstK/36 Bofors | | Sweden | 114 | | | The Swedish Bofors 37mm anti-tank gun were procured both from Sweden, Finland and Poland. It was in use between 1938 until 1944. Sold in 1986. |
| 37 PstK/37 | | Germany | 178 | | | The German PaK 36 was in use from 1940 until 1944. Sold in 1979. |
| 37 PstK/40 | | Germany | 178 | | | The German PaK 36 was in use from 1940 until 1944. Sold in 1979. |
Medium anti-tank guns (45 – 75 mm)
| 45 PstK/32 | | Soviet Union | 203 (Note: The number of 45 mm AT guns still in Finnish inventory in 1948.) | | | The Soviet 45 mm anti-tank gun 19-K, in use 1939 – 1944. Sold in 1993. |
| 45 PstK/37 | | Soviet Union | 79 | | | The Soviet 45 mm anti-tank gun 53-K, in use 1939–1944. Sold in 1993. |
| 45 PstK/38 | | Soviet Union | 133 | | | The Soviet 45 mm anti-tank gun 53-K, in use 1939–1944. Sold in 1993. |
| 45 PstK/38-41 | | Soviet Union | 54 | | | The Soviet 45 mm anti-tank gun 53-K, in use 1939–1944. Sold in 1993. |
| 45 PstK/41 | | Soviet Union | 4 | | | The Soviet 45 mm anti-tank gun M1938 (20-K). |
| 45 PstK/42 | | Soviet Union | 2 | | | The Soviet 45 mm anti-tank gun M-42, in use 1939–1944. Sold in 1993. |
| 47 PstK/35 47 PstK/39 | | Italy | 22 | | | Italian Cannone de 47/32. In use 1940–1942. Sold in 1959. |
| 47 PstK/40 | | France | 12 | | 1940 – 1942 | French 47mm APX anti-tank gun. Sold in 1959. |
| 50 PstK/38 | | Germany | 27 | | | German 5 cm PaK 38 anti-tank gun. In operation from 1942 to 1944, sold in 1986. |
| 75 PstK/97-38 | | Germany | 46 | | | Bought in 1940 and upgraded in 1943 to 7.5 cm PaK 97/38 standard. In service until 1986. |
| 75 K/40 | | Germany | 210 | | | German 7.5 cm PaK 40 anti-tank gun. In operation from 1943 to 1986. |
| 75 K/44 | | Finland | 1 | | | Finnish prototype gun. |
Recoilless rifles
| 95 S 58-61 | | Finland | <1,000 | | | 95 mm recoilless gun. Colloquially known as musti ("Blackie"); the weapon makes a loud, distinctly dog bark-like sound when fired. In reserve. |

== Anti-ship missiles ==
| Model | Origin | Quantity | Image | Details |
|---|---|---|---|---|
| RO-63 | France | 200 missiles, (100 training, 52 anti-tank, 48 anti-ship), ? launchers. | | French SS.11 anti-tank missiles used in coastal defense, obtained in 1963. In operation from 1964 until 1995. |
| MTO 66 | Soviet Union | | | Soviet P-15 Termit, used as an anti-ship missile by the Finns.; It could be fired both from a separate missile carriage, but it was also transported on a rebuilt Comet tank. |
| MTO 85 | Sweden | Four batteries: Gulf of Finland: 3; Archipelago Sea: 1 | | The first version taken into use (1987 – 1991), the RBS-15SF (known in Finland as MTO-85 (Meritorjuntaohjus 1985)) was a variant of the Swedish RSB-15 Mk.II.; It was later modified into RBS-15SF-3 (a modernized Mk.II, known in Finland as MTO-85M).; It was replaced by the Pintatorjuntaohjus 2020 system. |

== Radars ==
| Model | Origin | Type | Quantity | Image | Details |
|---|---|---|---|---|---|
| Radioluotain (RL) m/40 Raija; GEMA FuMG 40 G Freya LZ-Stand (Freya radar) | Germany | Early warning radar | 4 units | | Two in use from 30 March 1943, and two more 20–23 June 1944. Range approx. 100 km. |
| Radioluotain (RL) m/39 Würzburg T Irja; Telefunken FuSE 62 Würzburg T/D ("Dora") | Germany | Gun laying radar | 8 units | | Mobile radar units. Range: 20–30 km. In operation 1943–1950s. |
| Radioluotain (RL) m/4? Riitta; Telefunken FuSE 65 Würzburg-Riese | Germany | Gun laying and tracking radar | 4 units | | In use 1944-03-10 |
| Liisa; FuG 202 Lichtenstein | Germany | Airborne radar | 8 units | | Arrived on 1944-03-10 but were not taken into use during the war. |
| m/45 Maija; FuMO 1 Seetakt | Germany | Maritime surveillance radar | 4 units | | 3 arrived in December 1943, and 1 in January 1944. |
| Vesa; Seeburg-Tisch | Germany | Mechanical Plotting table | | | |
| AN/TPS-1E | United States | Early warning radar | | | Bought as a gap-filler in 1954. Used until ca. 1988. |
| VRTTI VII | Finland | Early warning radar | 6 units | | In use between 1954–1970s. |
| Decca radar | United Kingdom | Counter-battery radar | | | In use from 1951 to ?. |
| Severi | United Kingdom | Counter-battery radar | | | In use from 1955 to 1976. Some were modified to airport radars, and were called Faarao. |
| Cymbeline FA 15 MKL | United Kingdom | Mortar locating radar | | | In use from 1976 to ca. 2000 |
