= Škoda 105 mm Model 1939 =

Škoda 105 mm Model 1939 (D9)
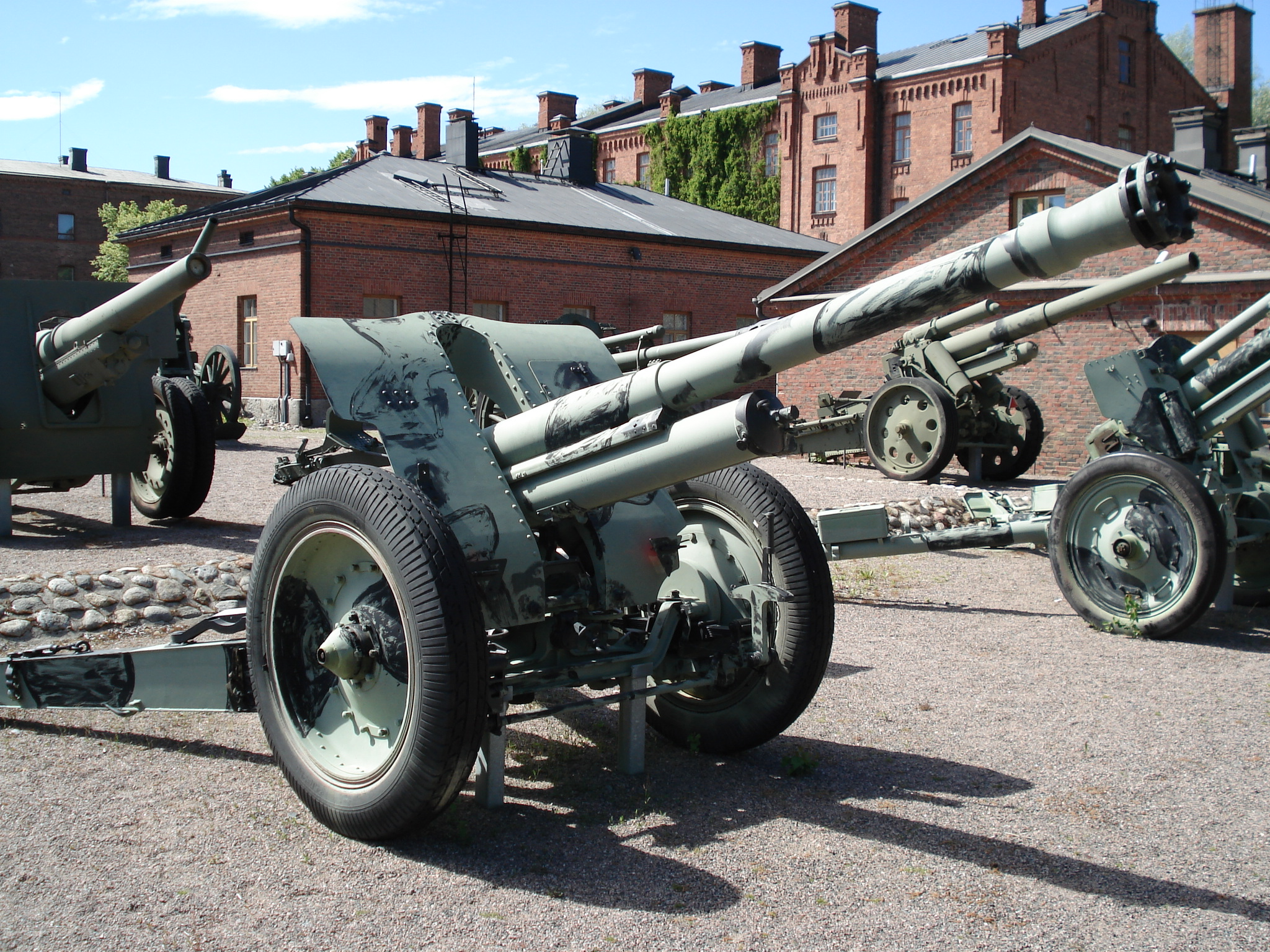
- Gun in Finnish service
- Type: Mountain gun
- Place of origin: Czechoslovakia

Service history
- In service: 1939–1945?
- Used by: Romania; Afghanistan
- Wars: World War II

Production history
- Designer: Škoda
- Manufacturer: Škoda

Specifications
- Mass: 1,400 kg (3,100 lb)
- Barrel length: 2.51 m (8 ft 3 in) L/23.9
- Shell: 15 kilograms (33 lb)
- Caliber: 105 mm (4.13 in)
- Carriage: Box trail
- Elevation: -7° 30' to +70°
- Traverse: 6°
- Muzzle velocity: 450 m/s (1,476 ft)
- Maximum firing range: 11,000 m (12,000 yd)

The Škoda 105 mm Model 1939 (105 mm M.39) was a mountain gun, manufactured by Škoda Works as a companion piece for the 75 mm M.39. This was a revised version of the 100 mm M.16 and 100 mm M.16/19. Like them it was broken down into three loads, each towed by a pair of horses, for transport.
