= Škoda 100 mm Model 16/19 =

Czechoslovak mountain howitzer

10 cm horská houfnice vz. 16/19
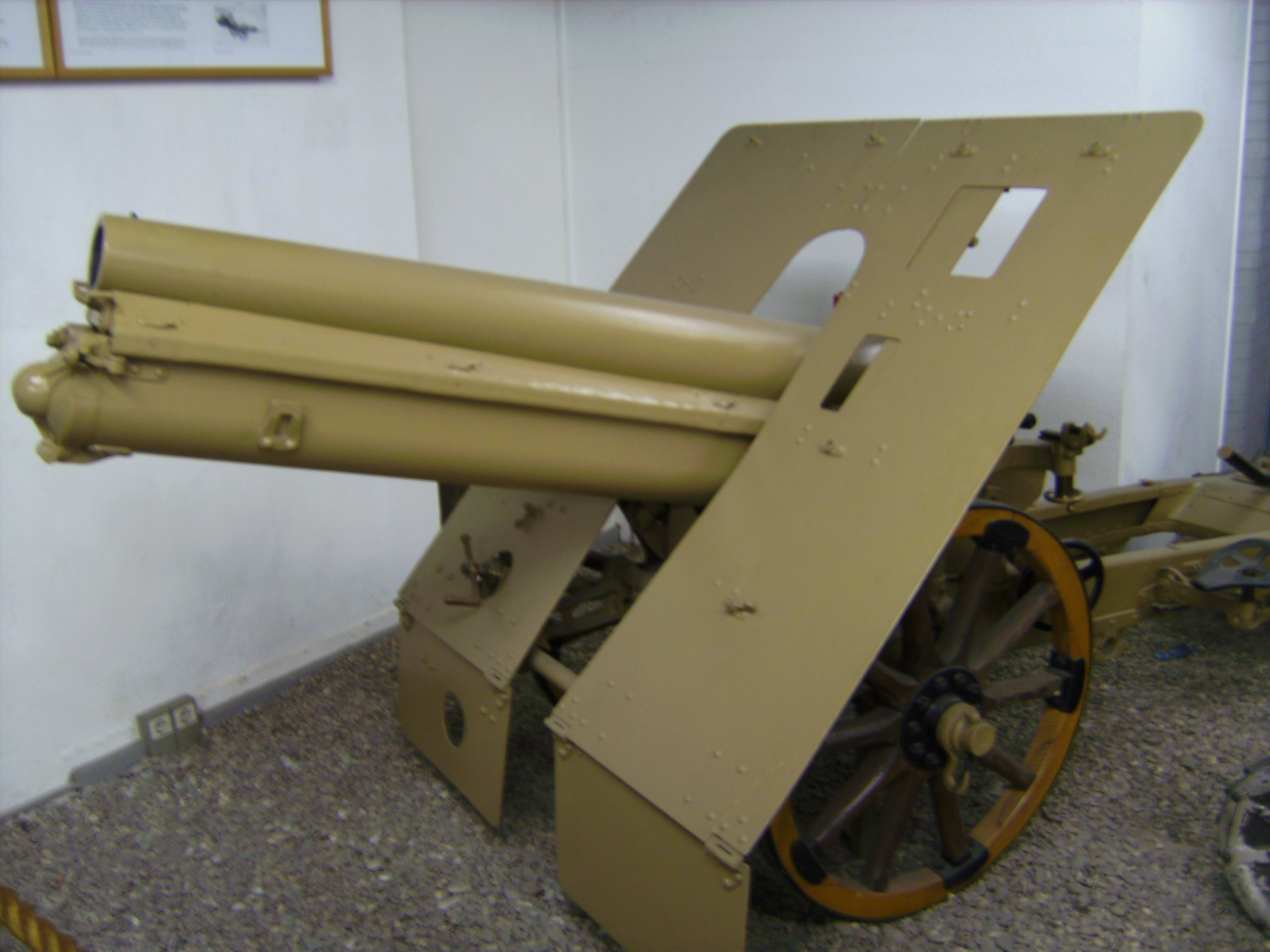
- Type: mountain howitzer
- Place of origin: Czechoslovakia

Service history
- In service: 1919–1945
- Used by: See users
- Wars: World War II

Production history
- Designer: Škoda
- Manufacturer: Škoda

Specifications
- Mass: 1,350 kg (2,980 lb)
- Barrel length: 2.4 m (7 ft 10 in) L/24
- Shell: 100 x 183 mm R
- Shell weight: 16 kg (35 lb)
- Caliber: 100 mm (3.9 in)
- Breech: Horizontal sliding-wedge
- Recoil: Hydro-pneumatic
- Carriage: Box trail
- Elevation: -7° 30' to +70°
- Traverse: 5° 30'
- Rate of fire: 5 rpm
- Muzzle velocity: 395 m/s (1,300 ft/s)
- Maximum firing range: 9.8 km (6.1 mi)

The Škoda 100 mm Model 16/19 (officially 10 cm horská houfnice vz. 16/19) was a mountain howitzer modified by Škoda Works from the design of the M.16, and its most notable difference was the longer barrel. It is unclear if they were newly built, or rebuilt from older howitzers. The Czechoslovak Army used this gun in both its 100 mm and 105 mm variants. After 1938, the guns were used by the Wehrmacht as 10 cm GebH 16/19(t) and 10.5 cm GebH(t). In addition, some of these guns were also used by Italy and Turkey, although this needs confirmation. The gun broke down into 3 loads for transport. The gun crew was protected by an armoured shield.

== Users ==
- Czechoslovakia
- Nazi Germany
- Greece
- Hungary
- Italy
- Poland
- Yugoslavia
