= 152 H 88 =

152 H 88 series
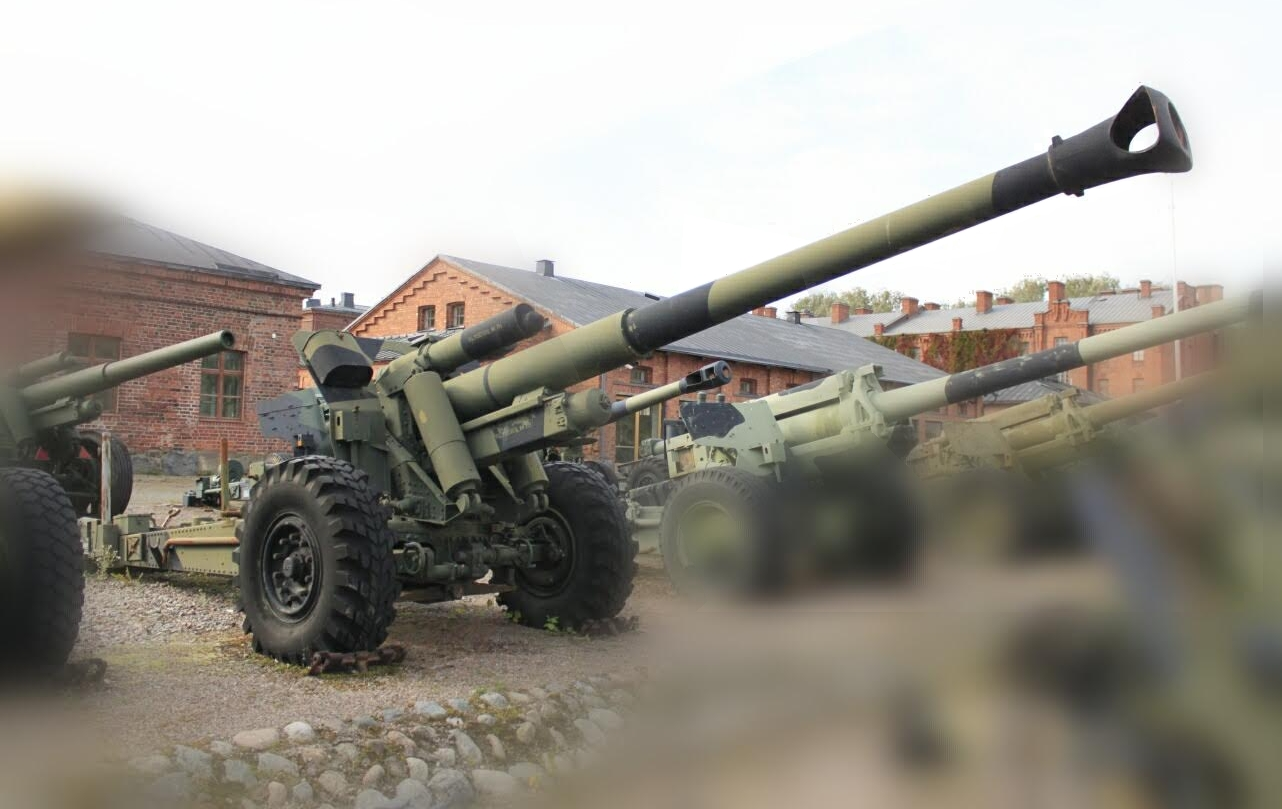
- 152 H 88-40 in Hämeenlinna, Finland
- Type: gun-howitzer
- Place of origin: Finland

Service history
- In service: 1988 - 2007
- Used by: Finland
- Wars: none

Production history
- Designer: Vammas Oy (modernization)
- Designed: 1988
- Manufacturer: Vammas Oy (modernization)
- Produced: Modernized in 1988
- No. built: 152 H 88-31: 21 units 152 H 88-37: 64 units 152 H 88-40: 47 units

Specifications
- Mass: 152 H 88-31: 8,340 kg 152 H 88-37: 8,100 kg 152 H 88-40: 6,800 kg
- Barrel length: 32 calibers
- Caliber: 152 mm
- Breech: interrupted screw or sliding block (152 H 88-40)
- Recoil: hydropneumatic
- Carriage: split trail
- Rate of fire: 4 shots/min
- Effective firing range: 16 km

152 H 88 is the name of a series of modernized 152 mm towed heavy howitzers with 32 caliber barrels. The guns of the series share the same barrel as well as other similar qualities, but differ slightly in appearance, since they consist of three different, older (modernized) versions. The modernization was carried out by Vammas Oy from 1988 to mid-1990s. The modernization project consisted of numerous modifications to the guns, some of which had already undergone earlier smaller modifications. The most important change was the replacement of the original barrels by a Finnish-made 152 mm barrel. Also the gun carriages were subjected to various modifications. After the modernization, increased towing speeds were made possible. The breech mechanism is manually operated in all the guns. All the 152 H 88 series artillery pieces are being withdrawn from service and scrapped (as of 2007).

== Versions ==
There are three different main versions of the gun:

152 H 88-31
A modernized Soviet 122mm A-19 gun converted to a howitzer by fitting a new 152 mm L/32 barrel. Finnish Army designation for the original A-19 version was 122 K 31. 21 units converted.
152 H 88-37
A modernized Soviet 152 mm ML-20 howitzer fitted with a new barrel. Original Finnish designation 152 H 37. 64 units modernized.
152 H 88-40
A modernized German 15 cm sFH 18 howitzer fitted with a new 152 mm barrel. Original Finnish designation 150 H 40. 42 units modernized.

The two Soviet models were either taken as war booty during the Continuation War or bought from the Germans. The German 15 cm sFH 18 guns were bought during the Interim Peace and saw service during the Continuation War.

== Ammunition ==
The howitzers use a cased variable charge separate-loading propellant system. The Soviet type ammunition is usually transported as complete in a wooden box. The weight of the projectile is 43 kg (with a 6 kg explosive charge), and the weight of the largest propellant charge is 8 kg. The guns can fire high-explosive fragmentation shells, which have a muzzle velocity of about 650 m/s and an effective radius of 50–150 meters.

The Soviet-made 152 mm D-20 howitzer (152 H 55) uses the same ammunition as the 152 H 88 series guns.

== See also ==
- Artillery
- Howitzer
- 152 H 55
- Former equipment of the Finnish Army
