= Saint-Chamond modèle 1921 =

French military vehicle

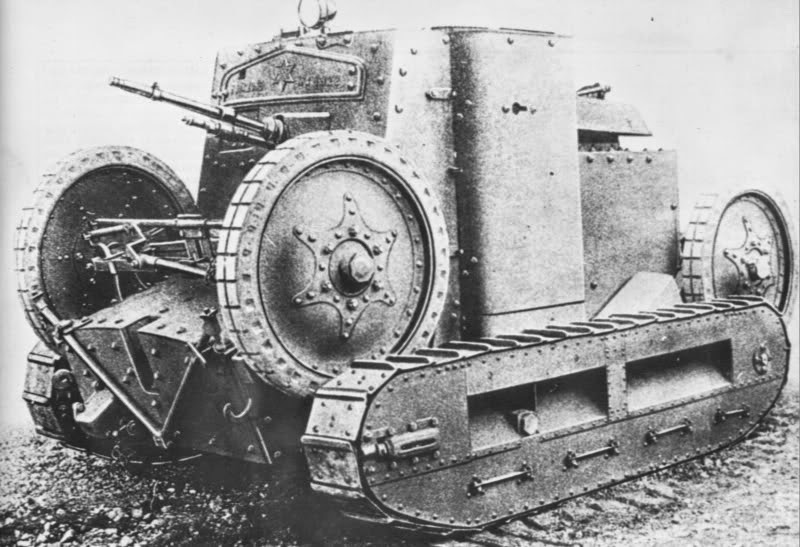
- Place of origin: France

Service history
- In service: 1921–1937

Production history
- Designer: Saint-Chamond
- Designed: 1919
- Manufacturer: CFAMH (Compagnie des Forges et Acieries of Marine et d'Homecourt)
- Produced: 1921–1924
- No. built: 12

Specifications
- Mass: 3 t (3.3 short tons)
- Length: 3.60 m (11 ft 10 in)
- Width: 1.86 m (6 ft 1 in)
- Height: 1.75 m (5 ft 9 in)
- Crew: 2 (driver and gunner)
- Armor: 6 mm (0.24 in)
- Main armament: 1 × 8 mm Hotchkiss Mle 1914 machine gun
- Engine: 6-cylinder, gasoline, 8 liters 15 hp (11 kW)
- Suspension: wheels at front and back tracks in the center
- Maximum speed: 28 km/h (17 mph) on wheels 6 km/h (3.7 mph) on tracks

The Saint-Chamond modèle 1921 was a prototype wheel-cum-track military vehicle made in France during the interwar period. The type was known as autochenilles.

== Design ==
This vehicle could move either on tracks in difficult terrain, or on its two sets of retractable wheels on roads. A small 2-cylinder, 2 hp (1.5 kW) auxiliary engine, installed on the rear axle generated the necessary force to lift the front axle completely, and the rear axle partially. The transition from wheel to track-drive took 10 minutes.

The initial model, the Model 1920, was a one-man vehicle; the driver, also acting as gunner, was seated inside the 6 mm armoured superstructure. The Model 1920 was armed with an 8mm Hotchkiss Mle 1914 machine gun, mounted on the superstructure front plate, slightly offset to the right. The first prototype was completed in 1920.

In tests, the M1920 showed good performance, reaching a speed of 28 km/h on wheels and 6 km/h on tracks. It overcame a 30° incline and was able to cross a ditch 1.7 m (5 ft 7 in) wide and 0.7 m (2.3 ft) deep. However, it soon became clear that it was very difficult for one person to combine the roles of driver and gunner, so some modifications were made to add one more person to the crew, and later it became standard (2 crew) for the St-Chamond tanks. After subsequent modifications and testing, the tank was approved in 1921 for series production under the designation “Chenillette St-Chamond Modele 1921”. Its production was limited to only 12 units since the French Army was not at interested in using the type of vehicle. A new version, equipped as a self-propelled howitzer, with a 75 mm M1897 gun, was presented to the French Army but this too failed to gain interest, as it was considered unsuitable for the battlefield due to its thin armor.

At the same time, the vehicle was offered to other nations, and initially it was well accepted. In 1923, an example was sold and sent to Finland, where it was subjected to a number of tests, which soon revealed that the mechanical drive and transmission could not support high loads, adding to this the lack of protection which left the crew exposed, the weaponry was also considered weak with limited firing angles. Based on these conditions, the Finnish delegation declined to buy further units. The vehicle was used for educational purposes, being decommissioned in 1937.

Another vehicle was sold to Japan, presumably in 1924. At the time the Imperial Japanese Army was considering the option of adopting an armored reconnaissance vehicle and the M1921 fit the requirements very well. However, the winner of the competition was the Carden-Lloyd Mk.VIb tankette, due to its better technical reliability.

There is also sources that say that Spain and the Soviet Union purchased the vehicle (or received for testing). Most likely, the vehicle's features were considered insufficient, as neither nation showed interest and there were no further sales. Poland acquired two vehicles, which after subsequent testing it was classified as "useless".

== Variants ==
A few other prototypes, the M1924, M1926, and the M1928 were produced, but gained no interest.

- Canon de Cavalerie automoteur de 75 Saint-Chamond Modele 1924 - chassis with 75mm gun facing to rear

== Operators ==
- France
- Finland: 1 unit
- Poland
- Soviet Union
- Japan
- Spain

== See ==
- Landsverk L-5
