= Škoda 75 mm Model 1939 =

Škoda 75 mm Model 1939 (C6)
- Type: Mountain gun
- Place of origin: Czechoslovakia

Service history
- In service: 1939–1945?
- Used by: Romania; Iran
- Wars: World War II

Production history
- Designer: Škoda
- Manufacturer: Škoda

Specifications
- Mass: 820 kg (1,810 lb)
- Barrel length: 1.57 m (5 ft 2 in) L/21
- Shell: 6.3 kilograms (14 lb)
- Caliber: 75 mm (2.95 in)
- Carriage: Box trail
- Elevation: -7° 30' to +70°
- Traverse: 7°
- Muzzle velocity: 480 m/s (1,575 ft/s)
- Maximum firing range: 10,200 m (11,200 yd)

The Škoda 75 mm Model 1939 (75 mm M.39) was a mountain gun manufactured by Škoda Works and exported in small numbers to Romania and Iran. The design was related to the Bofors L/22 sold to Switzerland. For transport, the gun could be broken into eight sections and carried by mule. The gun crew was protected by an armoured shield. Romanian guns equipped two mountain artillery battalions.
