= 87 mm light field gun M1877 =

87-mm field gun model 1877
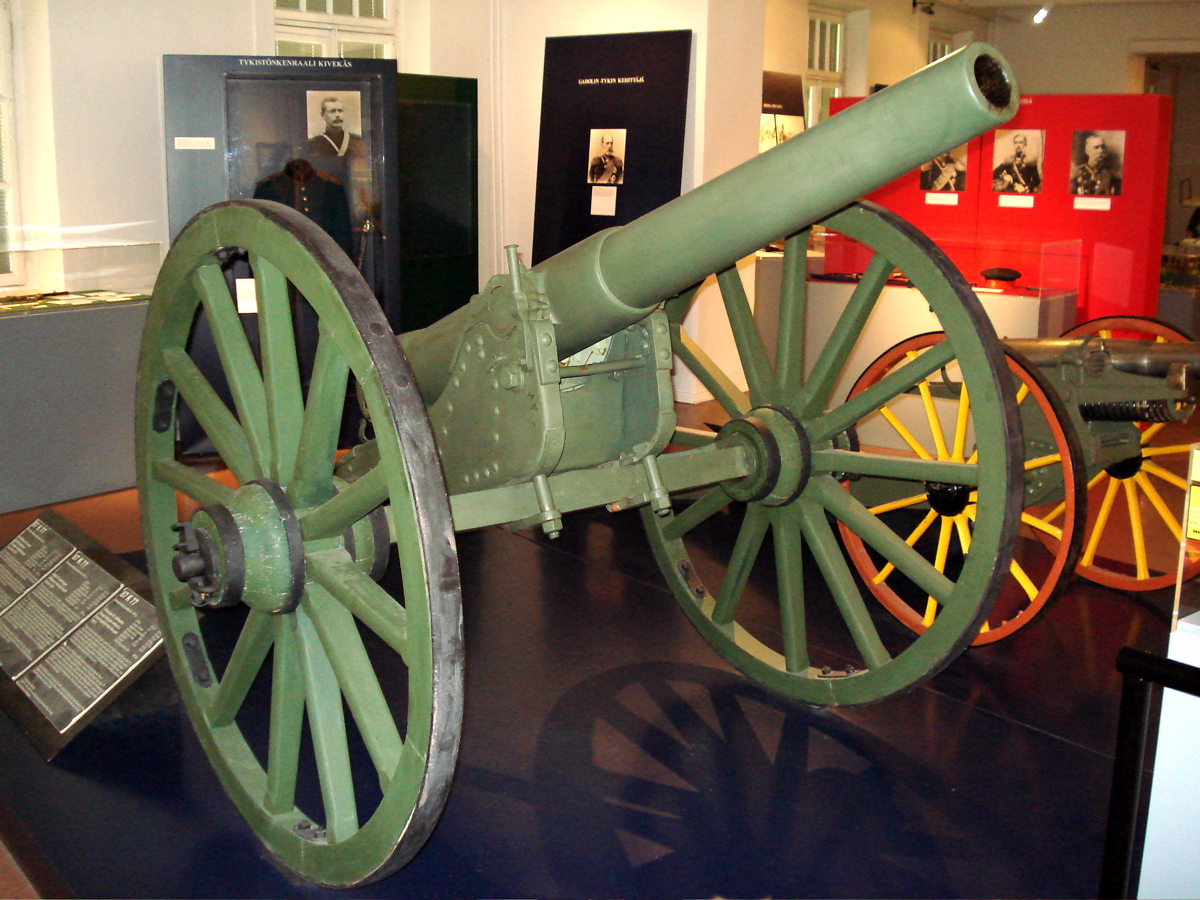
- M1877 87-mm field gun in Hämeenlinna Artillery Museum.
- Type: Field gun
- Place of origin: German Empire, Russian Empire

Service history
- Wars: Russo-Japanese War, World War I, Russian Civil War, Finnish Civil War

Production history
- Designer: Krupp

Specifications
- Mass: 445 kg
- Barrel length: 2,088 mm (82 in)
- Caliber: 87 mm
- Breech: Krupp horizontal sliding-block
- Recoil: none
- Carriage: fixed trail
- Elevation: 0° to 20°
- Maximum firing range: 6.5 km

87-mm light field gun M1877 (Russian: 87-мм полевая лёгкая пушка образца 1877 года) was a field gun utilized in Russo-Japanese War, World War I, Russian Civil War and a number of interwar period armed conflicts with participants from the former Russian Empire. The gun was initially developed by Krupp, but was also produced in the Russian Empire. Russian-manufactured pieces differed from the German-manufactured ones in breech type and construction elevation mechanism. The gun lacked recoil mechanism.

In addition to the standard variant, a lightweight version was produced. It had shorter barrel (18 calibers), which resulted in reduced muzzle velocity (412 m/s) and range (6 km), but also in much lighter construction (360 kg).

During World War I large number of guns were positioned in fortifications in western Finland. Early in the Finnish Civil War many of these guns were taken over by the Finnish White Guard and became its de facto standard artillery pieces. By the end of 1918 the Finnish Army possessed 144 guns of the type, but soon afterwards they were removed from active service because of obsolescence and their poor condition. A few remained in use in 1920s as practice pieces.
