= 15 cm sFH 18 =

15 cm schwere Feldhaubitze 18
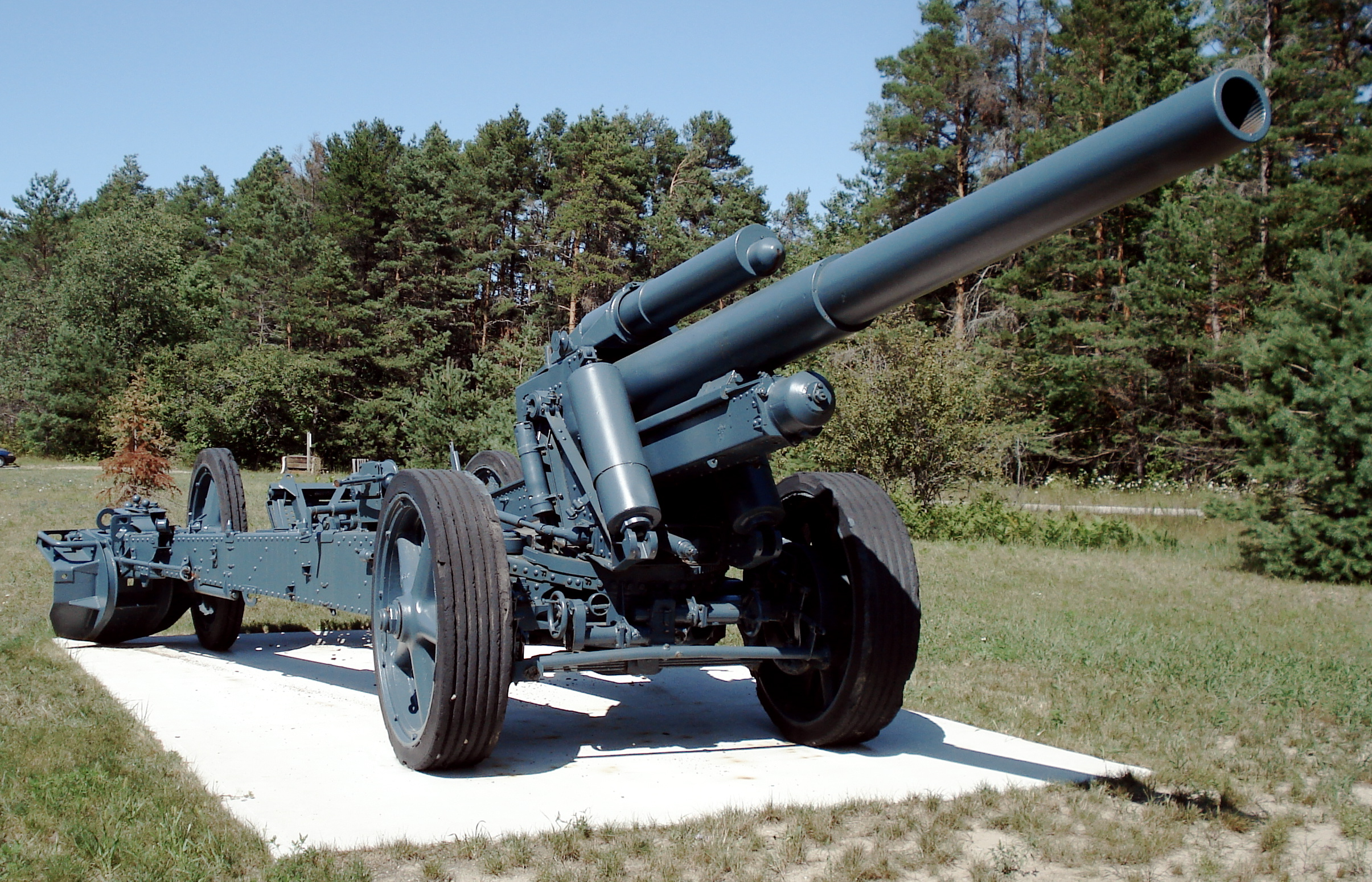
- Preserved sFH 18 howitzer at CFB Borden, Ontario, Canada
- Type: Howitzer
- Place of origin: Germany

Service history
- In service: 1934–1945 (Germany)
- Used by: See operators
- Wars: World War II; Second Sino-Japanese War; Portuguese Colonial War

Production history
- Designer: Krupp; Rheinmetall
- Designed: 1926–1930
- Manufacturer: Krupp, Rheinmetall, Spreewerke, M.A.N., Dörries-Füllner and Škoda
- Unit cost: 40,400 ℛ︁ℳ︁ (1944)
- Produced: 1933–1945
- No. built: 6,756
- Variants: See variants

Specifications
- Mass: Travel: 6,304 kg (13,898 lb); Combat: 5,512 kg (12,152 lb)
- Length: 7.849 m (25 ft 9.0 in)
- Barrel length: 4.440 m (14 ft 6.8 in) L/29.5
- Width: 2.225 m (7 ft 3.6 in)
- Height: 1.707 m (5 ft 7.2 in)
- Crew: 7
- Shell: 149 mm × 260 R Separate loading cased charge
- Shell weight: 43.52 kg (95.9 lb) (HE)
- Caliber: 149 mm (5.9 in)
- Breech: horizontal sliding-block
- Recoil: hydro-pneumatic
- Carriage: split trail
- Elevation: 0° to +45°
- Traverse: 60°
- Rate of fire: 4 rpm
- Muzzle velocity: 520 m/s (1,700 ft/s)
- Effective firing range: 9,725 m (10,635 yd)
- Maximum firing range: 13,250 m (14,490 yd); RAP: 18,200 m (19,900 yd)
- Sights: Model 1934 Sighting Mechanism

The 15 cm schwere Feldhaubitze 18 or sFH 18 (German: "heavy field howitzer, model 18"), nicknamed Immergrün ("Evergreen"), was the basic German division-level heavy howitzer of 149 mm (5.9 in) during the Second World War, serving alongside the smaller but more numerous 10.5 cm leFH 18. Its mobility and firing range and the effectiveness of its 44 kg (97 lb) shell made it the most important weapon of all German infantry divisions. A total of 6,756 examples were produced.

It replaced the earlier, First World War-era design of the 15 cm sFH 13, which was judged by the Krupp-Rheinmetall designer team of the sFH 18 as completely inadequate. The sFH 18 was twice as heavy as its predecessor, had a muzzle velocity increase of forty percent, a maximum firing range 4.5 km (2.8 mi) greater, and a new split-trail gun carriage that increased the firing traverse twelvefold. The secret development from 1926 to 1930 allowed German industry to deliver a trouble-free design at the beginning of German re-armament in 1933. It was the first artillery weapon equipped with rocket-assisted ammunition to increase range. The sFH 18 was also used in the self-propelled artillery piece schwere Panzerhaubitze 18/1 (more commonly known as Hummel).

The sFH 18 was one of Germany's three main 15 cm calibre weapons, the others being the 15 cm Kanone 18, a corps-level heavy gun, and the 15 cm sIG 33, a short-barreled infantry gun.

== Design and development ==
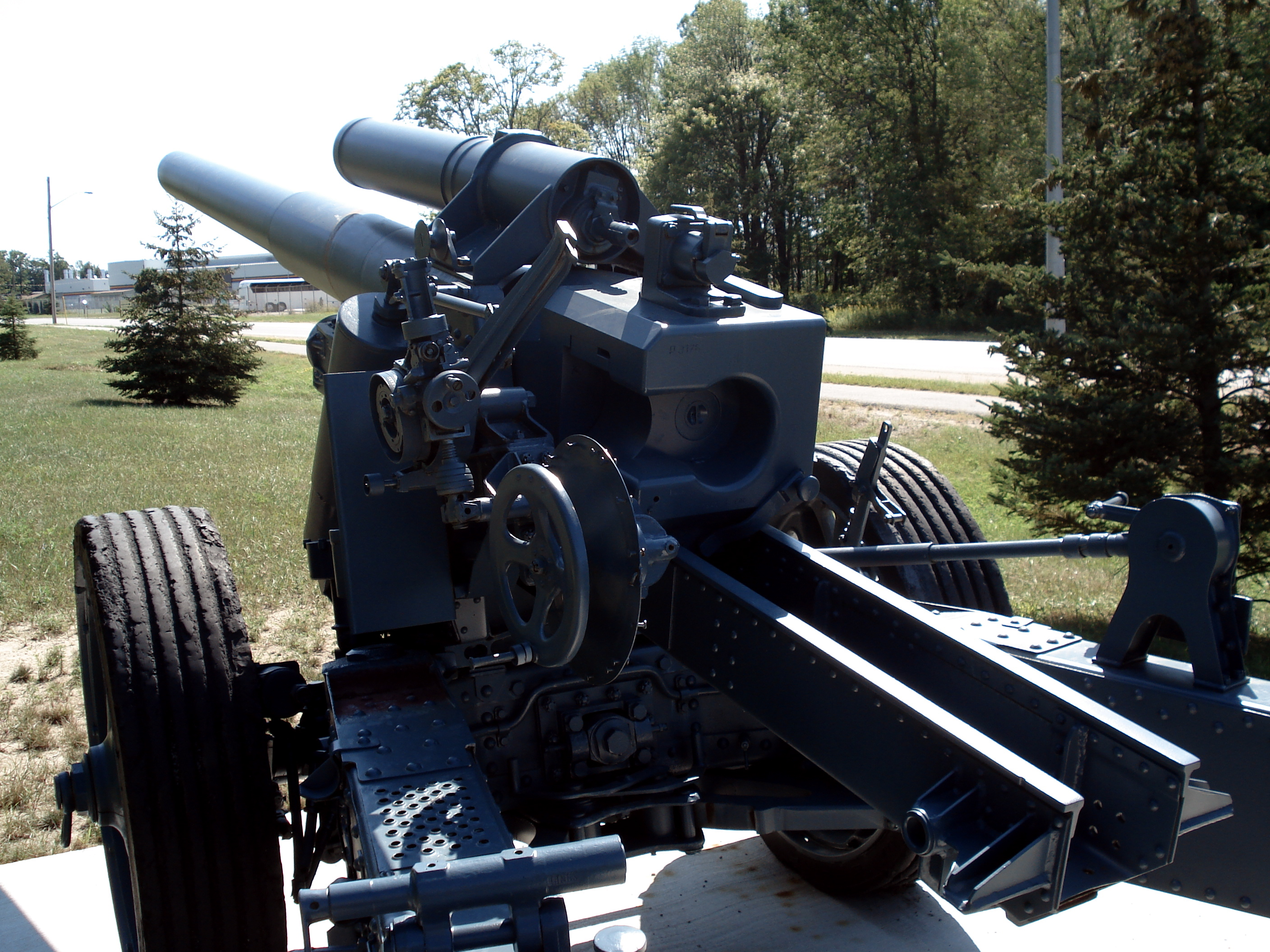
Rear of Preserved sFH 18 howitzer at CFB Borden

Development work on the sFH 18 began in 1926 and the gun was ready for production by 1933. The model year was an attempt at camouflage the fact that it was illegally developed after the signing of the Versailles Treaty in 1919. The howitzer was a Rheinmetall gun mounted on a Krupp carriage.

The carriage was practically identical to the 10 cm schwere Kanone 18, using a split-trail design with box legs. Spades were carried on the sides of the legs that could be mounted onto the ends for added stability. A horse-towed version which could be broken down into two loads (barrel and carriage) and another version for motorized towing (in a single load) were produced.

The 43.5 kg (96 lb) shell was heavy enough to demolish field fortifications and disrupt enemy armoured formations, giving the gun greater versatility over the 10 cm sK 18, despite the relatively modest range of 13,250 m (14,490 yd), which in practice was limited to 9,725 m (10,635 yd): while the sFH 18 was provided with eight propellant charges, the last two charges were rarely used since they caused excessive erosion on the chamber, compromising the seal between cartridge and breech. Use of charges 7 and 8 were only allowed in emergency cases with the authorization of the field commander, but no more than ten rounds could be fired consecutively with these charges, and their use had to be written down. In an attempt to remediate this shortcoming, the designers added a replaceable chamber liner and a muzzle brake (to reduce stress on the carriage) in 1942. These modified howitzers received the designation sFH 18M, but the restrictions on the propellant charges remained in place.

The only remarkable feature of the sFH 18 was that it was the first weapon to make use of rocket-assisted projectiles (RAP), which in theory would give the howitzer a range equal or superior to the 10 cm sK 18, replacing it and freeing up German production capacity for more important weapons; In practice, the Rückstoßgranate 19 (RGr 19) round was overly complex and inaccurate: the blast of the rocket booster disrupted the airflow over the shell body. Another problem was that the booster decreased the space available for the explosive payload. As result, it was withdrawn from service shortly after being introduced in 1941.

The gun was officially introduced into service on 23 May 1935, and by the outbreak of war the Wehrmacht had about 1,353 of these guns in service. Production continued throughout the war, reaching a peak of 2,295 guns in 1944. In 1944, the howitzer cost 40,400 ℛ︁ℳ︁, 9 months and 5,500 man-hours to make. During WWII, the guns were produced at four different factories: Spreewerk, in Berlin-Spandau; MAN, in Augsburg; Dörries-Füllner, in Bad Warmbrunn (Cieplice Śląskie-Zdrój, Poland); and Škoda facility in Dubnica, Slovakia.

Production of sFH 18, pcs.
Year	Pre-War	1939	1940	1941	1942	1943	1944	1945	Total
Produced, pcs.	1,353	190	580	516	636	785	2,295	401	6,756

== Ammunition ==
The 15 cm sFH 18 used separate-loading, cased charges. Types of ammunition included: High-explosive shells (HE), concrete-piercing, hollow charge, smoke, discarding sabot. The RGr 19 rocket-assisted projectile used a special charge and could only be fired from howitzers fitted with muzzle brakes such as the sFH 18M due to the excessive strain on the recoil system.

Experimental rounds included a HE-Fragmentation shell with an inner lining of concrete with metal fragments embedded and filled with low-grade explosive, in order to provide fragmentation comparable to conventional HE-FRAG shells, but with considerable economy of material; a long-ranged shell with a long hollow skirt at the rear to improve stability during flight and a ballistic cap fitted over the nose; and at least two fin-stabilized designs the Flügelminen (winged mines) - these shells were intended to use the extended length provided by the fins to obtain extra stability.

sFH 18 ammunition table
Model	Type	Weight	Filling	Filling weight	Notes
15 cm Gr. 19	HE	43.5 kg (96 lb)	TNT		Standard HE shell, minor variations existed reflecting the manufacturer production methods, but all had similar ballistic performance.
15 cm Gr. 36 FES	HE	38.5 kg (85 lb)	TNT		Improved high-explosive shell, 150 mm (5.9 in) longer than the Gr. 19 but it had thinner walls, making it lighter.
15 cm Gr. 19 Be	Concrete-piercing	43.5 kg (96 lb)	TNT	4.75 kg (10.5 lb)	Fitted with a round-tip light alloy ballistic cap, the inner walls were lined with a sulphur compound and the base fuse had three settings: long, short, or instantaneous.
15 cm Gr. Be rot	Concrete-piercing	43.45 kg (95.8 lb)	TNT	3.25 kg (7.2 lb)	Improved version of the Gr. 19 Be with thicker walls to increase shell body strength. The inner walls were lined with waxed cardboard.
15 cm Gr. 39 FES Hl	HEAT	24.55 kg (54.1 lb)	TNT		Could also be fired from the 15 cm sFH 13 howitzer. A tracer pellet was fitted in the base.
15 cm Gr. 39 FES Hl A	HEAT	24.57 kg (54.2 lb)	TNT		Modified version of the Gr. 39 FES Hl with a longer warhead while the internal arrangements were modified to match the 10.5 cm leFH 18 shell. It had a muzzle velocity of 460 m/s (1,509 ft/s).
15 cm Gr. 19 Nb	Smoke	39 kg (86 lb)	Oleum and pumice		
15 cm Gr. 38 Nb	Smoke	43.47 kg (95.8 lb)	Oleum and pumice		Improved bursting smoke shell with a larger bursting charge to improve the obscuring capabilities.
15 cm R Gr. 19 FES	RAP	45.5 kg (100 lb)	TNT		Maximum range 19,000 m (21,000 yd).
15 cm Sprgr 42 TS	HE, discarding sabot	29.6 kg (65 lb)	TNT	4.05 kg (8.9 lb)	Both driving bands became detached during flight.

== Combat record ==
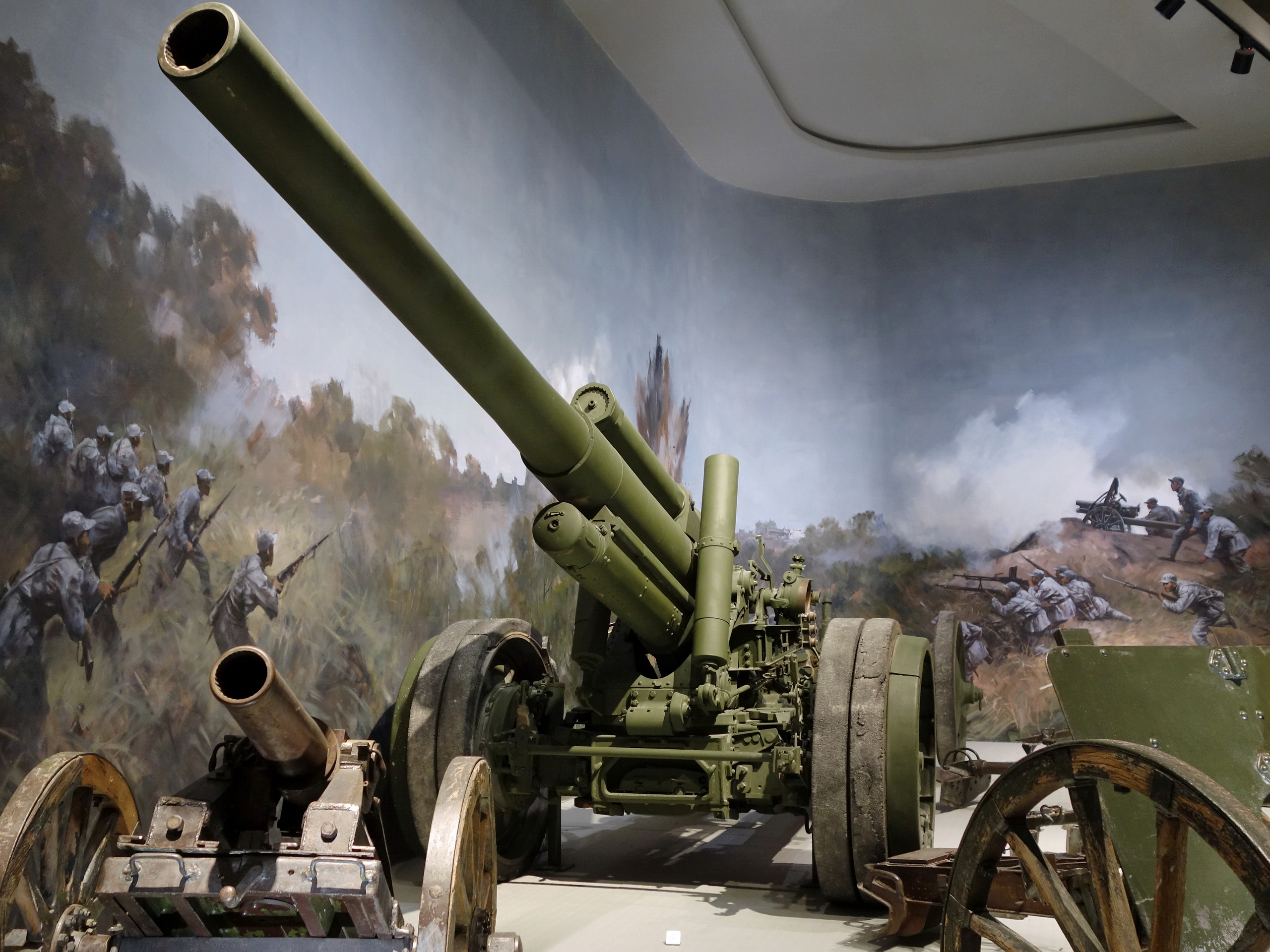
Rheinmetall FH-18 32/L in Military Museum of the Chinese People's Revolution

=== Second-Sino Japanese War ===
The first field combat for the 15 cm sFH 18 was with the Chinese National Revolutionary Army against the Imperial Japanese Army (IJA). The Chinese planned on purchasing a total of 240 sFH 18/32L guns but only 24 were delivered by 1937 due the lack of funds. These guns were used to form the 10th Artillery Regiment. A second order was placed in 1936, but by that time, production of the Rheinmetall gun was discontinued in favor of the sFH 18, which was produced by both Krupp and Rheinmetall. According to Ness and Shih, 48 sFH 18 guns and at least 37,000 rounds of ammunition were delivered between 1937 and 1938 and used to form the 13th and 14th Artillery regiments. By early 1942, the Chinese still had 44 howitzers available, but by May 1945 this number dropped to 15 sFH 18/32L and 18 sFH 18 models.

Ammunition supply was a problem for the Chinese: in 1937, the 10th Artillery Division only had 200 rounds per gun (in comparison the IJA forces in Shanghai had 416 rounds per gun). Following the 1937 and 1938 campaigns, ammunition per gun increased to 1,000 rounds but only because the guns weren't used often: after losing a large amount of irreplaceable equipment, the Generalissimo Chiang Kai-Shek threatened "dire consequences" to any commander who lost artillery pieces to the enemy. In late 1944, the Chinese sent the Allies a request for the supply of captured German ammunition. 4,400 HE shells, 1,788 concrete-piercing shells and 11,000 propellant charges were shipped to India in early 1945, but made it no further due the limited transport capacity between the Indian-Chinese border.

=== Second World War ===
During combat in the Eastern front, the sFH 18 lack of range became clear as its crews found themselves outranged by certain Soviet guns. The Germans tried to remedy the situation by modifying some howitzers with longer gun barrels, and introducing a RAP round to increase range, but these solutions suffered from poor accuracy and were eventually abandoned in favor of using the 17 cm Kanone 18 for counter-battery fire. In late 1944, when the United States Army began advancing faster than its artillery supply lines, captured sFH 18s were used against their former owners along the Franco-German border.

Several countries continued fielding the sFH 18 after the war in large numbers including Bulgaria, and Romania. In Czechoslovakia, surviving guns were modified to fire Warsaw Pact-standard 152 mm shells; the last remaining guns were withdrawn from service in the late 1980s. Some guns were sold to Italy while Finland bought 48 howitzers from Germany in 1939. These guns were modernized to increase range and fire 152 mm ammunition under the designation 152 H 88-40. They were used by the Finnish Army as late as 2007.

== Variants ==
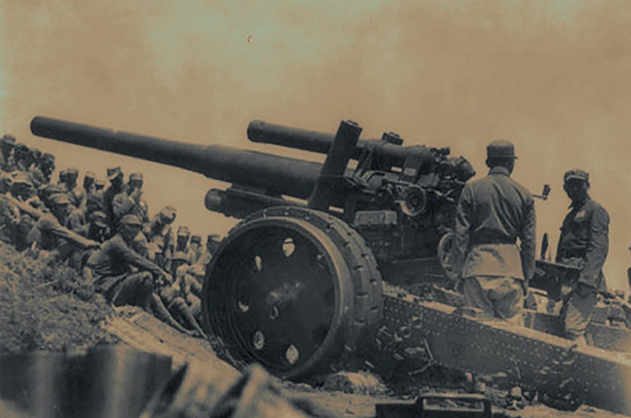
A sFH 18 of the National Revolutionary Army, 1937

- 15 cm sFH 18 (Bespg.) – Standard version for horse towing (für Bespannung − "for team towing"), it could be broken down into two loads for transport: barrel and carriage and could be reassembled for combat in 20 minutes
- 15 cm sFH 18 (für Kfz.) – Standard version fitted with solid rubber rims and pneumatic brakes for motorized towing (für Kraftzug)
- 15 cm sFH 18/32L − A competing design from Rheinmetall with a 32 caliber barrel. It can be distinguished by the slightly longer barrel and equilibrators. 24 were sold to the Nationalist government in China before production was discontinued in favor of the sFH 18
- 15 cm sFH 36 − A lightened version with a shorter barrel, allowing it to be towed by a single horse team. It was produced in small numbers until 1941, since the short barrel made it even more vulnerable against Soviet counter-battery fire and production required light alloys that were needed to build aircraft
- 15 cm sFH 18M – Modification of the sFH-18 with a muzzle brake (Mündungsbremse) and replaceable chamber liner to allow the use of more propellant charges

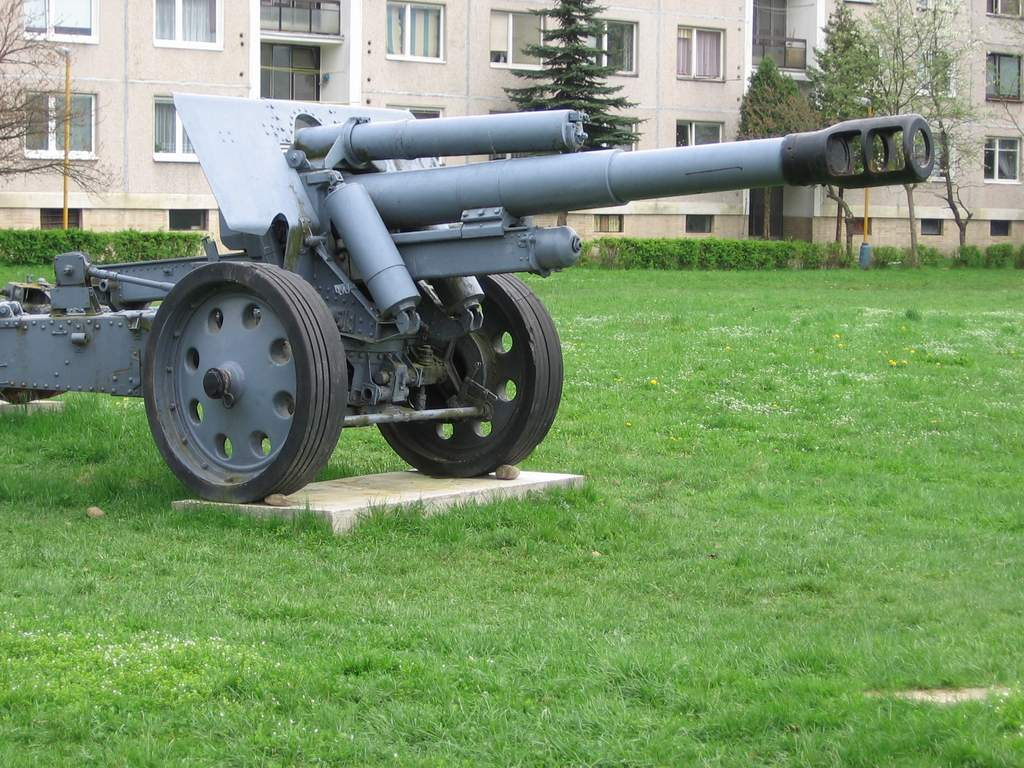
152 mm Howitzer M18/46 in Svidnik museum

- 15 cm sFH 40 − Experimental designs produced by Krupp and Rheinmetall. Prototypes were ready for testing in 1941, but with without production capabilities available, it wasn't accepted for service. According to Gander, some the sFH 40 barrels were mated with the sFH 18 carriages to create the sFH 18/40
- 15 cm sFH 18/40 – Extended range version fitted with a longer 32.5 caliber barrel and a muzzle brake. It had a range of 15,100 m (16,500 yd), but accuracy was poor. According to Gander, forty-six guns were built in total while Zaloga gives a total of 14 guns in 1941 and 35 in 1942 (under the designation 15 cm sFH 42)
- 15 cm sFH 18/43 – An experimental sFH 18 featuring a sliding-block breech that could accept bagged propellant charges, it never got past prototype stage
- 152 mm Howitzer M18/46 – Post-war Czechoslovak modification with a shorter barrel that was rebored to fire Soviet 152 mm ammunition, a straight topped gun shield and a double-baffle muzzle brake
- 152 H 88-40 – Post-war Finnish modernization rebored to fire Soviet 152 mm ammunition. Range was extended to 16,000 m (17,000 yd)
- Hummel − Self-propelled version mounted on a tracked chassis using components from the Panzer III and Panzer IV. 714 were produced between 1942 and 1945

== Operators ==
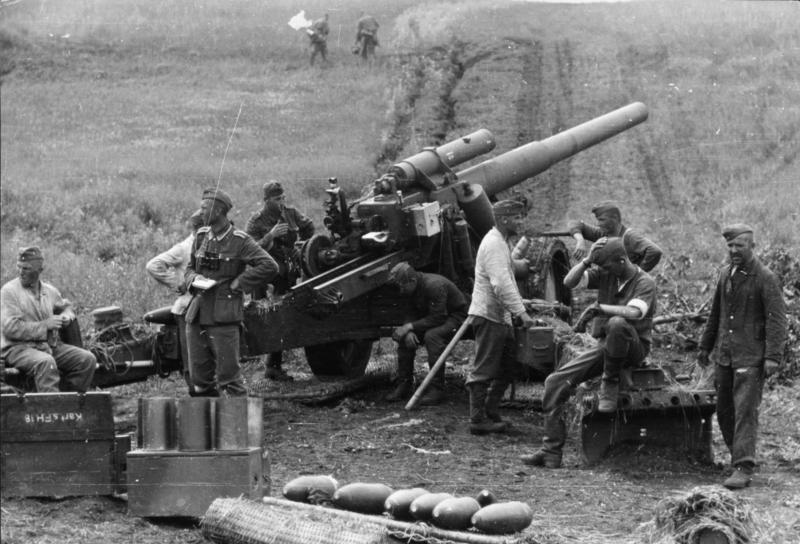
German forces with a 15 cm sFH 18 howitzer on the Eastern Front.

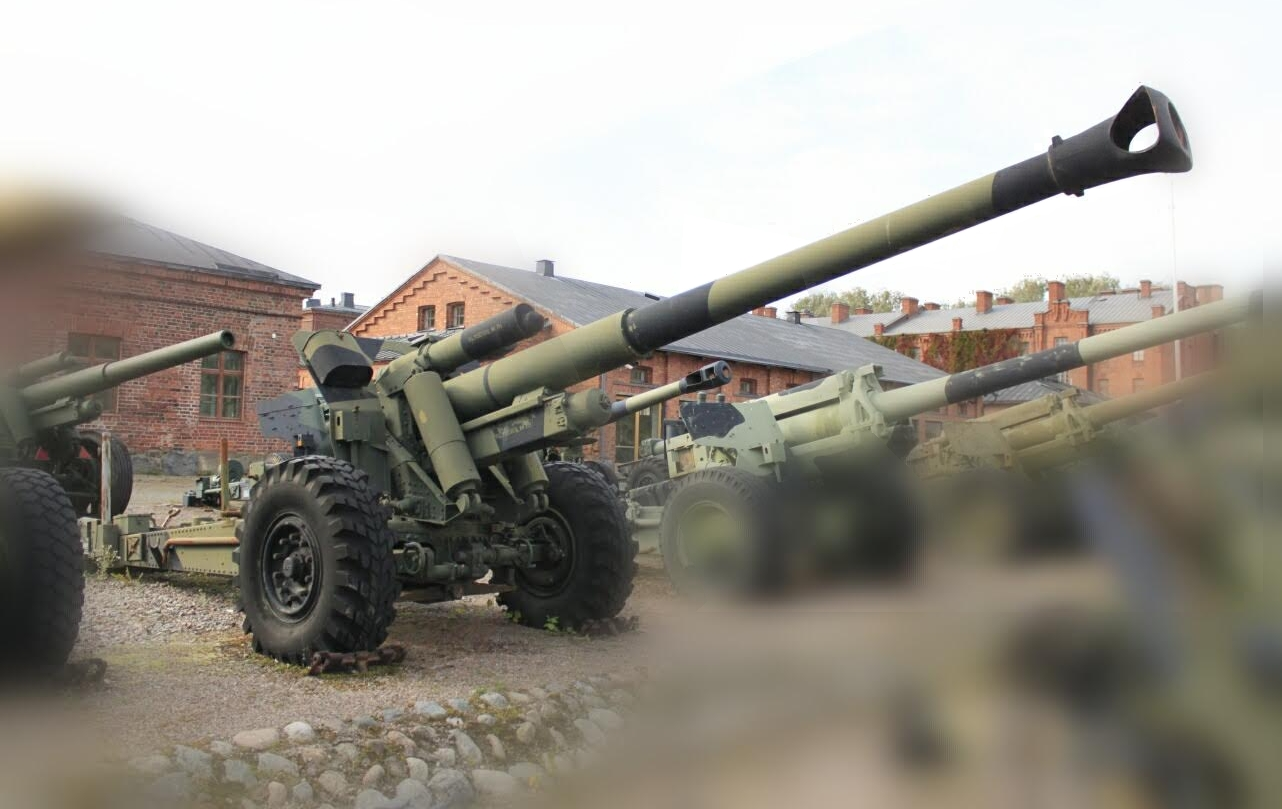
152 H 88-40. Finnish modernized version of 15 cm sFH 18.

- Albania – Post-war use
- Argentina
- Austria − sFH 18M
- Bulgaria – Post-war use
- Chile
- China − 24 sFH 18/32L and 48 sFH 18
- Czechoslovakia – Modified as the Howitzer M18/46. Kept in reserve as late as 1976
- Finland – 48 pieces, modernized as the 152 H 88-40, it remained in use as late as 2007
- Nazi Germany
- Italy – Designated as the Obice 149/28
- Portugal – Post-war use
- Romania − Post-war use
- Sweden − Designated as Haubits m/39
- United States − Limited use of captured guns during WWII
- Yugoslavia – sFH 18 and sFH 18M

== See also ==
- 152 mm howitzer-gun M1937 (ML-20) – Soviet 152 mm howitzer
- BL 5.5 inch Medium Gun – British gun of similar size
- 10 cm schwere Kanone 18
