= Škoda 100 mm Model 1916 =

WWI and WWII Austro-Hungarian mountain gun

10 cm Gebirgshaubitze M. 16
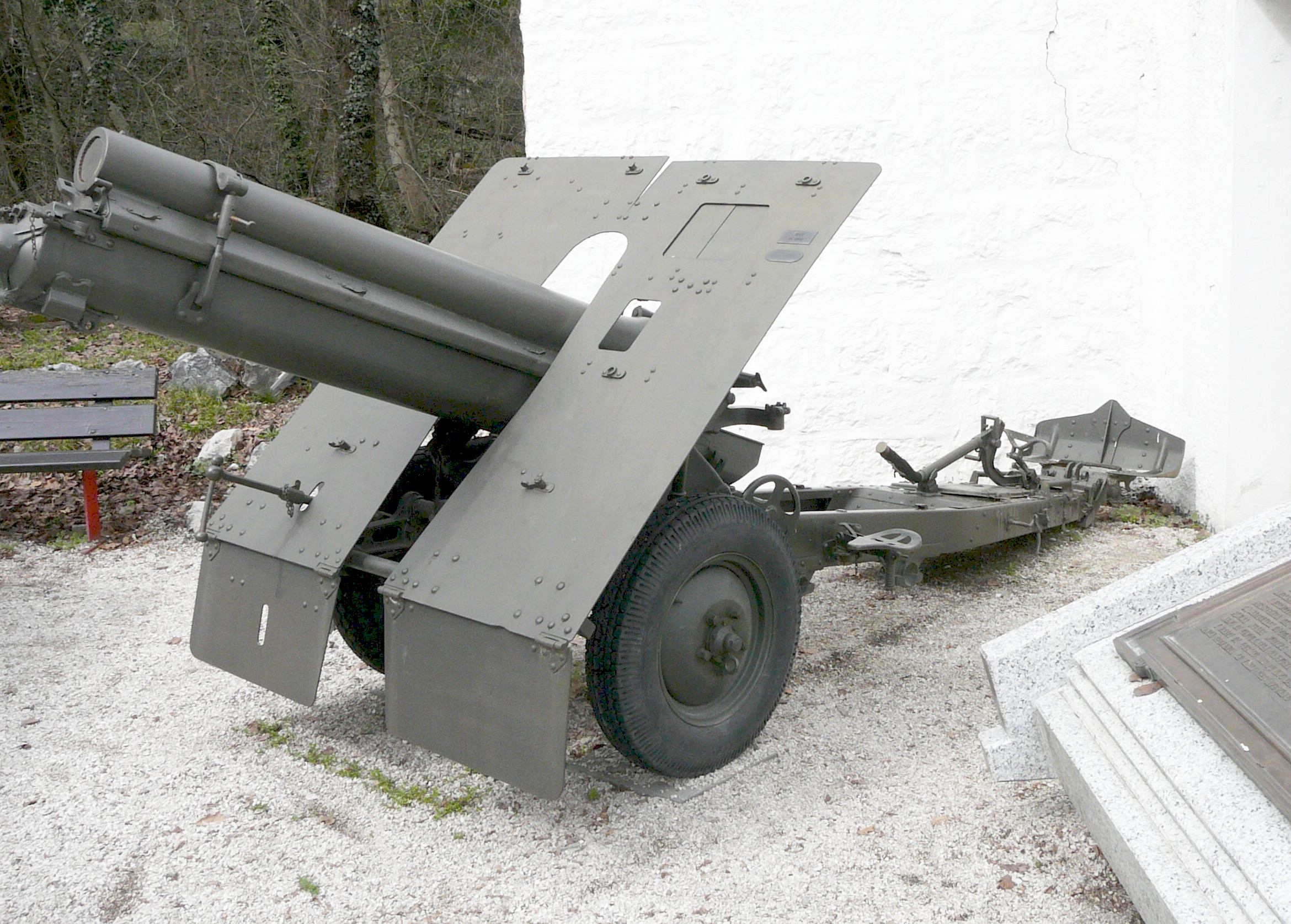
- An Italian Škoda 100 mm model 1916 in the Historical Museum of the Alpini.
- Type: Mountain gun
- Place of origin: Austria-Hungary

Service history
- In service: 1916–1945
- Used by: See § Operators
- Wars: World War I World War II

Production history
- Designer: Škoda
- Manufacturer: Škoda
- Produced: 1915–1918
- Variants: 10.5 cm Gebirgshaubitze M. 16(T)

Specifications
- Mass: 1,235 kg (2,723 lb)
- Barrel length: 1.93 m (6 ft 4 in) L/19
- Shell: 100×132mmR
- Shell weight: 16 kg (35 lb) (Czech); 13.4 kg (30 lb) (Italian)
- Caliber: 100 mm (3.9 in)
- Breech: Horizontal sliding-wedge
- Recoil: Hydro-pneumatic
- Carriage: Box trail
- Elevation: -8° to +70°
- Traverse: 5.5°
- Rate of fire: 5 rpm
- Muzzle velocity: 341 m/s (1,120 ft/s) (Czech); 407 m/s (1,340 ft/s) (Italian)
- Effective firing range: 7,090 m (7,750 yd) (Czech)
- Maximum firing range: 8,490 m (9,280 yd) (Italian)

The Škoda 100 mm Model 1916 (100 mm M.16) was a mountain howitzer used by Austria-Hungary during World War I, developed from the 10 cm M. 14 Feldhaubitze. The Turks used a 105 mm variant, the M.16(T). The Wehrmacht redesignated this as the 10 cm GebH 16 or 16(ö). Guns acquired from Italy, after 1943, were known as 10 cm GebH 316(i); those acquired from Czechoslovakia were 10 cm GebH 16(t). The Italians referred to weapons gained either through capture or reparations as the Obice da 100/17 modello 16. The gun could be broken into three sections, intended for towing by two animal carts. The gun crew was protected by a gun shield. The Italians used lighter shells than the Czechs, which accounts for the greater range and muzzle velocity of their guns.

== Operators ==
- Austria-Hungary
- Czechoslovakia
- Nazi Germany
- Kingdom of Greece
- Kingdom of Hungary
- Kingdom of Italy
- Second Polish Republic
- Kingdom of Romania
- Turkey
- Kingdom of Yugoslavia

== Photos ==
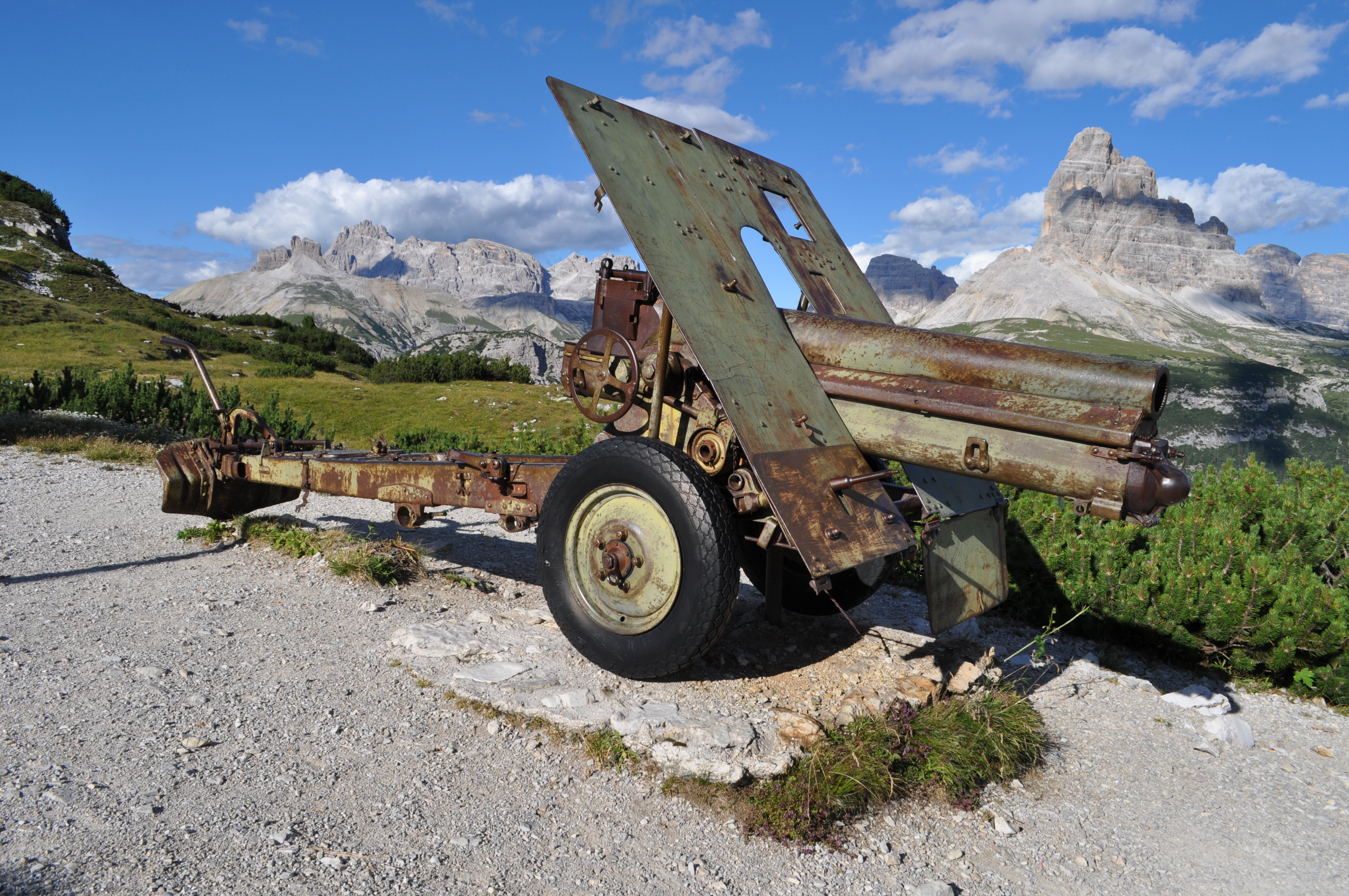
Škoda M.16 howitzer on Monte Piana.

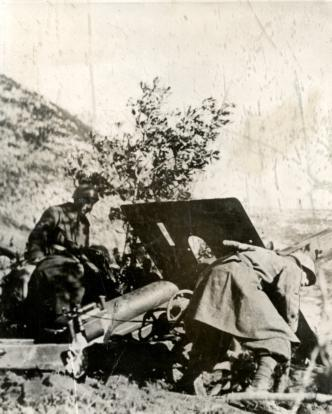
Italian soldiers using Škoda M.16 howitzer in the Balkans, 1941.

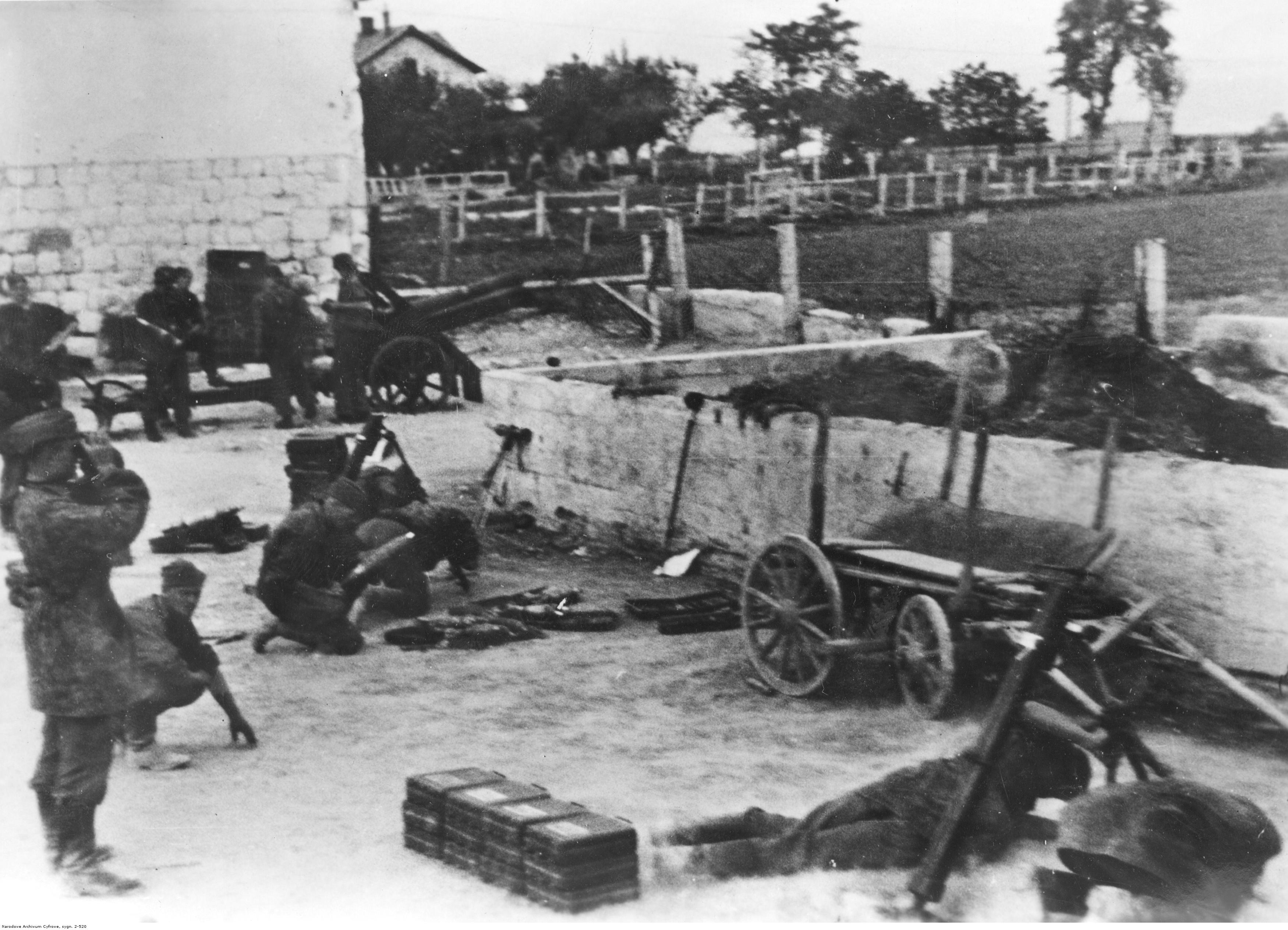
Weapons in use with an SS Mountain Rifle Division in Dalmatia.
