= 7.62 ITKK 31 VKT =

Finnish anti-aircraft machine gun

7,62 ItKk/31 VKT
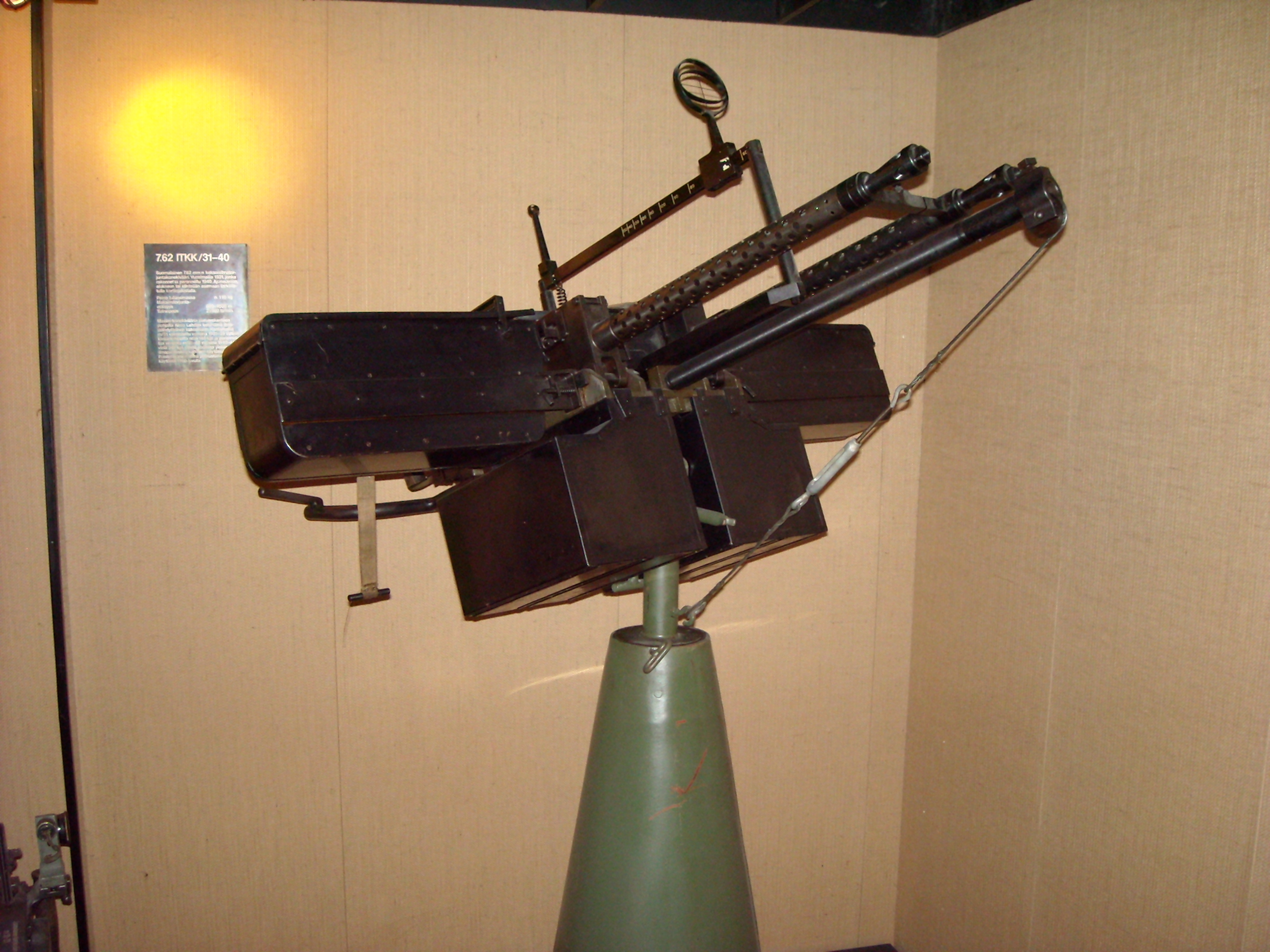
- 7,62 ItKk/31-40 VKT on M/31 cone mount
- Type: Anti-aircraft machine gun
- Place of origin: Finland

Service history
- In service: 1933–1986
- Used by: Finland
- Wars: Winter War; Continuation War; Lapland War

Production history
- Designer: Aimo Lahti
- Designed: 1931
- Manufacturer: VKT (Valtion Kivääritehdas)
- Produced: 1933–1944
- No. built: 507
- Variants: 7,62 ItKk/31-40 VKT

Specifications (7,62 ItKk/31 VKT)
- Mass: 104 kg (229 lb) with mount 47 kg weapon only
- Length: 113 cm (44 in)
- Barrel length: 72.3 cm (28.5 in)
- Crew: 6
- Shell: 7.62×53mmR
- Barrels: 2
- Action: Short-recoil operation
- Carriage: M/31 cone mount M/40 tubular tripod mount
- Elevation: -10° - 80°
- Traverse: 360°
- Rate of fire: 2× 900/minute
- Muzzle velocity: 800 m/s (2,600 ft/s)
- Effective firing range: 600 m (2,000 ft)
- Maximum firing range: 1,000 m (3,300 ft)
- Feed system: 250-round disintegrating metallic belts
- Sights: Ring sight

7,62 ITKK 31 VKT or 7,62 mm VKT anti-aircraft machine gun was the primary anti-aircraft machine gun of the Finnish Army during World War II. The weapon was designed by the Finnish gunsmith Aimo Lahti. 507 weapons were produced in two versions, 7,62 ItKk/31 VKT and an improved 7,62 ItKk/31-40 VKT, between 1933 and 1944.

== Background ==
In the 1920s Finland was a young state, having just attained independence from Russian Empire. As a result of being part of Russia the vast majority of the armaments of the Finnish army was composed of old Tsarist Russian army equipment, and air defence weapons were few and obsolete. As part of the attempt to improve anti-aircraft armament it was decided to develop purpose-built anti-aircraft machine guns for the army since infantry Maxim machine guns were not adequate for the task. A development plan for 1930-1934 called for 125 heavy 13.2 mm machine guns and 125 7.62 mm machine guns. The task for designing the weapons was given to the gunsmith Aimo Lahti.

== 7,62 ItKk/31 VKT ==
The prototype of the 7,62 mm anti-aircraft machine gun was finished in 1931 and accepted for use as 7,62 mm kaksoisilmatorjuntakonekivääri m 31 or 7,62 ItKk 31 ("7.62 mm double anti-aircraft machine gun model 31"). 130 weapons were ordered from Valtion Kivääritehdas (VKT, the "State Rifle Factory") in 1933 and first batch of guns was distributed to units on 22 June 1934. A further small batch of 10 guns was produced in 1940, bringing the total to 140.

Technically 7,62 ItKk/31 VKT is a Maxim machine gun that has been modified for a higher rate of fire with an accelerator and the use of 250-round disintegrating metallic belts (instead of canvas belts). With these modifications the weapon has a rate of fire of 900 rounds per minute for each gun. The weapon is also air-cooled instead of water-cooled, and has a barrel jacket closely resembling the one in Lahti-Saloranta M/26 light machine gun. At barrel ends are conical flash suppressors. In the twin anti-aircraft machine gun configuration two guns are connected side by side with belt boxes on both sides of the pair and square boxes under both guns for empty shells and belt links. Both guns have cocking handles on the right side and recoil springs on the left; the left hand gun has a modified feed system to allow the belt run from left.

Both guns have their own handles which are a mix between a pistol grip and a more usual shovel-handle type used in Maxim machine guns. Each handle has a trigger operated with a forefinger. Support bars protruded from the rear of the weapon that the gunner leaned on to bear the weapon on target. The weapon was used on a 135 cm high cone mount M/31 which, while it worked, was heavy and cumbersome to move. The sight was typical ring sight of the era, with an oval-shaped front sight with two concentric rings while the rear sight was a small peg surrounded by a protective ring. In action the anti-aircraft machine gun had an intended crew of six: commander, gunner, two loaders and two ammunition handlers. Equipment included a transport case for the weapon, spare barrels, locks and springs, toolkit and a wooden transport case for ten spare belt boxes.

== 7,62 ItKk/31-40 VKT ==
Already in the 1930s it was found that the 7,62 ItKk/31 VKT had some shortcomings. The recoil of the guns tended to cause muzzle climb during shooting, resulting in poor accuracy. During Winter War further problems were found: the mount was heavy and cumbersome, and calibre of the weapon was not powerful enough. This last problem was exacerbated by the fact that the design of a domestic heavy 13.2 mm anti-aircraft machine gun had not proceeded beyond prototype stage; further development of this weapon was stopped soon after. The calibre problem could not be helped, but some of the other problems could be solved and testing of different improvements began already in summer 1939.

The most serious problem, the muzzle climb, was solved by modifying the muzzle brake to direct propellant gases only upwards, thus providing a force to counteract the muzzle climb from recoil. However, this unsymmetrical force also necessitated reinforcing the barrels and barrel jackets. Another important improvement was a new sight for the weapon. An additional rectangular bar was fitted between the rear and front sights and the front ring sight was mounted on this bar so that it could be moved back and forth based on the estimated speed of the aircraft. The ring sight was re-designed, with an outer ring for 60° shooting angle and an inner ring for 30° angle. The conical mount was replaced with a new tubular tripod mount M/40. The tripod was later further modified to reduce weight. Total modifications are:

- Heavier barrel
- Heavier barrel jacket with a greater amount of circular cooling openings
- Conical muzzle brake with openings to direct propellant gases upwards
- New sight
- Tripod mount

On 17 March 1941, 240 weapons were ordered from Valtion Kivääritehdas, with a further 82 weapons to be delivered later. However the start of the Continuation War delayed the production, and mass-production did not began in earnest until 1943. A total of 367 weapons were produced, with a majority in 1944. Some guns were not finished in time to take part in the war. Additionally some of the original models were modified for the new standard during repairs.

== Service history ==
7,62 ItKk/31 VKT and 7,62 ItKk/31-40 VKT were the most numerous anti-aircraft machine guns used by the Finnish army during World War II. They were used in anti-aircraft machine gun companies and platoons, and later as close defence weapons for anti-aircraft gun batteries. After the war the guns were used in training until the 1960s, and were kept warehoused until 1986, when they were finally declared obsolete. When the guns were removed from inventory there were 467 weapons, of which 41 were in the original 7,62 ItKk/31 VKT configuration. A portion of the guns were given to museums, and rest were scrapped in 1988.

== See also ==
- 20 ITK 40 VKT 20 mm anti-aircraft gun designed by Aimo Lahti
