= 20 ITK 40 VKT =

20 ItK 40 VKT
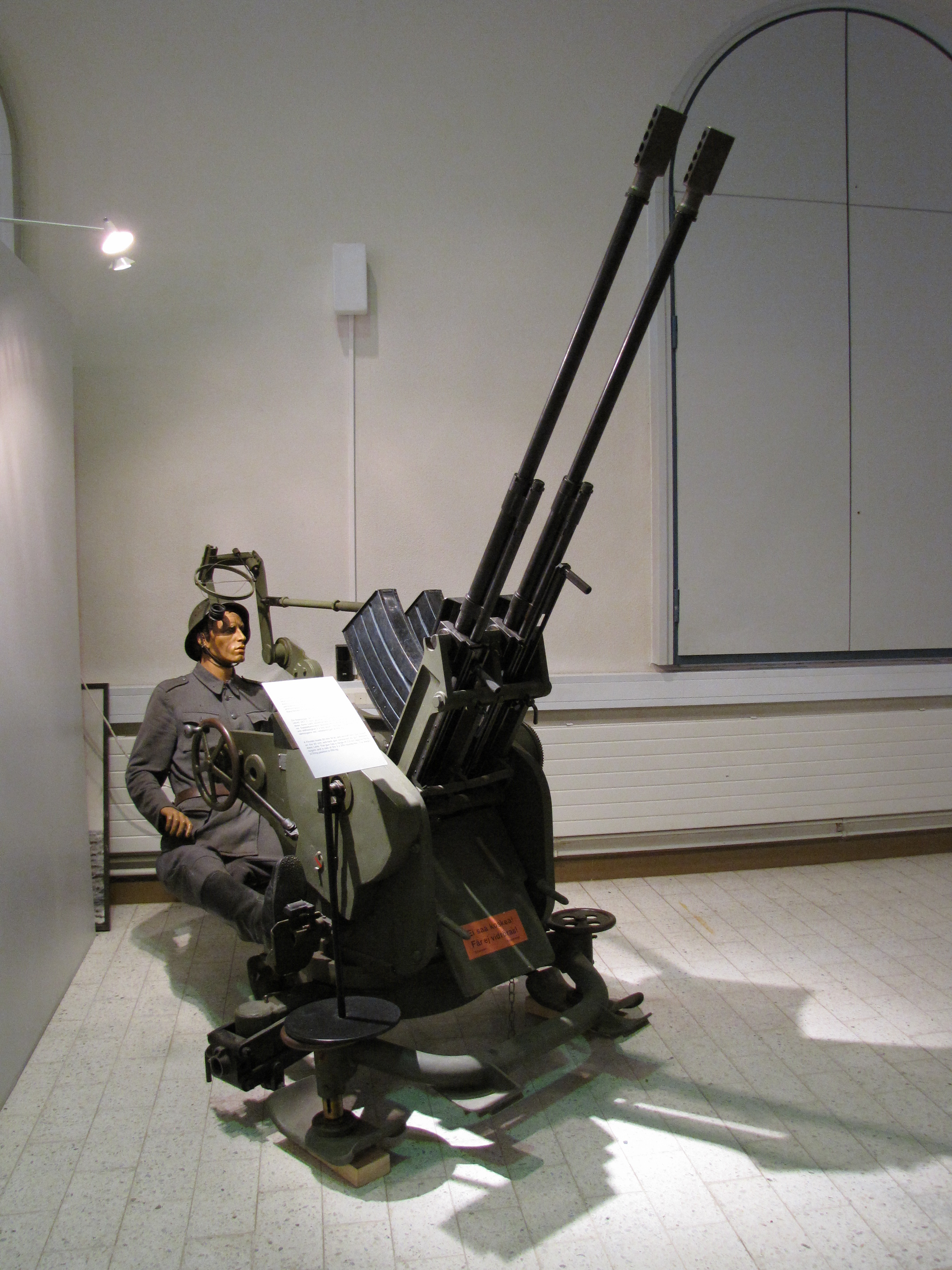
- 20 ItK 40 VKT
- Type: Light anti-aircraft gun
- Place of origin: Finland

Service history
- In service: 1943–1988
- Wars: Continuation War; Lapland War

Production history
- Designer: Aimo Lahti
- Designed: 1940
- Manufacturer: VKT (Valtion Kivääritehdas)
- Unit cost: FIM 244,420
- Produced: 1943–1944
- No. built: 174

Specifications
- Mass: 652 kg (1,437 lb) (firing position); 778 kg (1,715 lb) (transport)
- Length: 425 cm (13 ft 11 in)
- Barrel length: 1.3 m (4 ft 3 in)
- Width: 1.35 m (4 ft 5 in)
- Shell: 20×138B
- Barrels: 2
- Elevation: −10° to +90°
- Traverse: 360°
- Rate of fire: 2×700/minute (cyclic max, adjustable); 2×250/minute (practical)
- Muzzle velocity: 830–850 m/s (2,273–2,788 ft/s)
- Effective firing range: 1,200 m (3,900 ft)
- Maximum firing range: 2,200 m (7,200 ft)
- Feed system: 20 round magazines
- Sights: M/Strömberg (original) m/55 pendulum ring sight (after 1955)

The 20 ItK 40 VKT or 20 mm dual anti-aircraft cannon model 1940 manufactured by VKT was a Finnish light anti-aircraft gun designed by the Finnish gunsmith Aimo Lahti. As the only multi-barrel 20 mm anti-aircraft gun, the 20 ItK 40 VKT was the most effective 20 mm air defence weapon used by the Finnish Army during World War II. A total of 174 guns were built, used in training until the 1970s and kept in reserve until 1988. The gun received the nickname Vekotin (gadget) from Finnish soldiers. The nickname was reached by adding to the abbreviation of manufacturer, VKT.

== Background ==
The 20 ItK 40 VKT is a dual anti-aircraft gun designed by Aimo Lahti. The gun barrels and mechanisms are based on the L-39 anti-tank rifle converted from semi-automatic to full automatic fire and with the stock and barrel shroud removed. A prototype L-39 anti-aircraft gun was completed just before the Winter War, but Lahti made some improvements to the design and the mass-production version was designated L-40. Airforce headquarters ordered a series of 50 guns from Valtion Kivääritehdas (VKT, State Rifle Factory) in January 1940 and a further 120 guns in June 1941. Production was delayed, however, and the first guns were finished only in 1943. Of the total number of 174 guns, 155 were produced in 1943 and 19 in 1944. The guns were distributed to units in small batches soon after they were completed.

== Design ==
Unlike the L-39 anti-tank rifle, weapons in the 20 ItK 40 VKT are designed for full-automatic fire and so do not suffer from the similar structural weaknesses as the full-automatic conversion L-39/44 anti-aircraft rifles. The rate of fire for the gun is adjustable, with a maximum cyclic rate of 2 × 700 rounds per minute, and a more commonly used rate of 2 × 360 rounds per minute. The gun is loaded from 20 round magazines, with an empty weight of 5.6 kg and 11–12 kg full, depending on the type of ammunition. The 20×138B Long Solothurn cartridge used in 20 ItK 40 VKT was also used in the L-39 anti-tank rifle as well as the other 20 mm anti-aircraft guns, the 20 ITK 30 and 20 ITK 35, used by field army units. The gun sight, designed by Osmo Niskanen and manufactured by Strömberg company, was not entirely satisfactory and was more complicated to use than the sight in the German 20 ITK 30. The gun trailer was also problematic, as it was rather frail and offered a ground clearance of only 20 cm. Thus the towing speed was limited to 30–40 km/h and the mobility of the gun was limited. Equipment used with the gun included spare magazines with a transport case, gun tarpaulin, a transport case for the gun sight and a toolkit.

== Service use ==
The 20 ItK 40 VKT was used by Finnish light anti-aircraft batteries in Continuation War and Lapland War along with other 20 mm guns. At the end of the war the 20 ItK 40 VKT was the most numerous field army 20 mm anti-aircraft gun (the 20 mm Madsen was more numerous, but used primarily by navy and coastal artillery or at the home front). The guns made it through the war mostly intact. After the war the 20 ItK 40 VKT was considered to be the only still satisfactory 20 mm anti-aircraft gun, although it was recommended to re-design the gun sight. The re-design was realized in 1955 when a new m/55 pendulum ring sight was accepted into service. The same sight was also later used on 20 ITK 30. The 20 ItK 40 VKT was used in training until the 1970s and they were kept in storage as reserve weapons until 1988.

== See also ==
- 7,62 ITKK 31 VKT anti-aircraft machine gun, also designed by Aimo Lahti
