= Solothurn ST-5 =

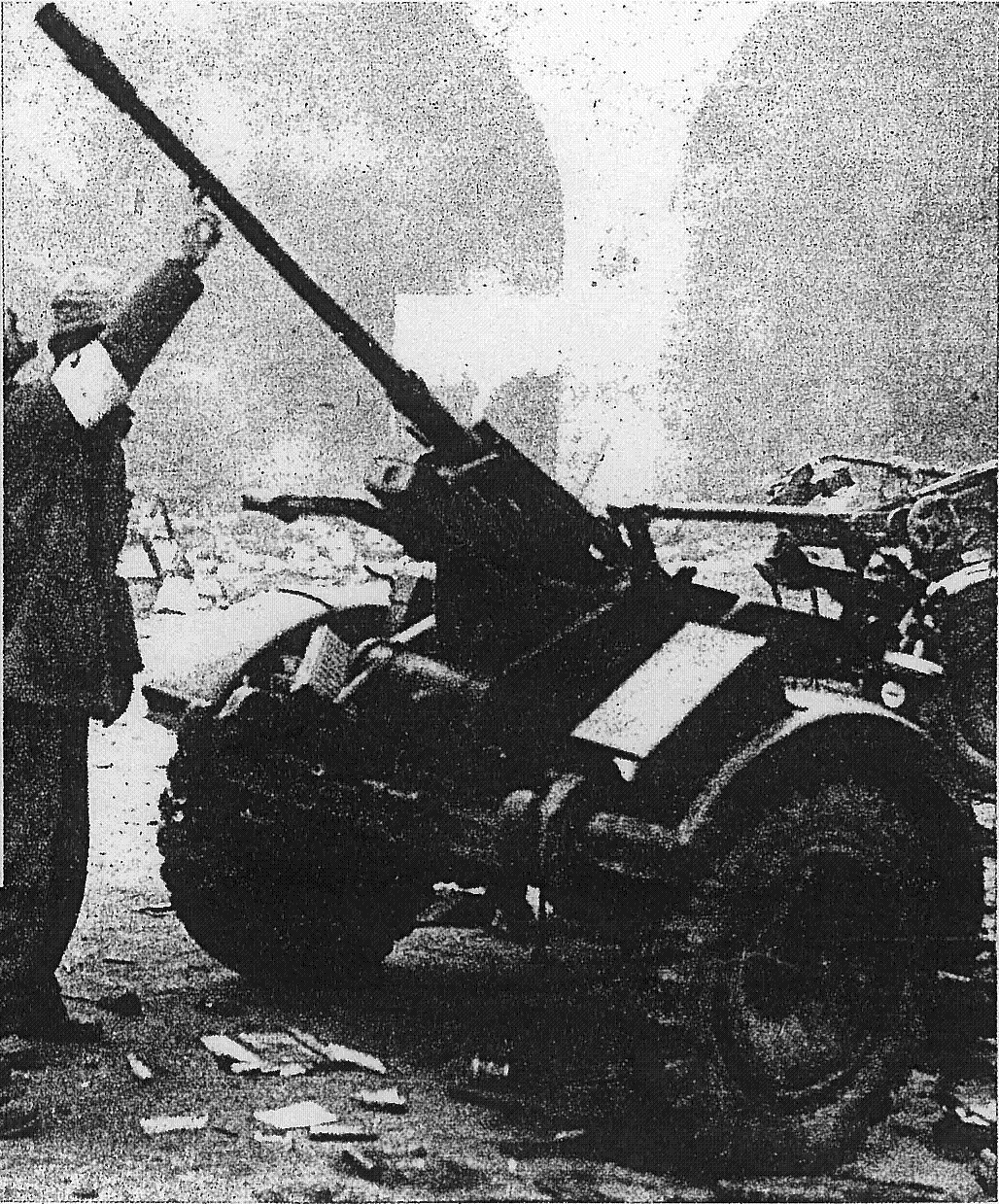
- A Chinese Army Solothurn ST-5 AA gun was captured by the Japanese Imperial Army in Nanjing, 1937.
- Type: Anti-aircraft cannon

Service history
- Used by: Nazi Germany
- Wars: World War II

Specifications
- Shell: 20×138mmB
- Caliber: 20 mm (.79 in)

The Solothurn ST-5 is a 20 mm anti-aircraft gun designed by Waffenfabrik Solothurn in Switzerland which ultimately was the design basis for the highly successful 2 cm Flak 30 series of guns used by Germany in World War II.

Solothurn was owned by the German firm Rheinmetall, which at the time was prohibited from developing certain weapons. It and other German manufacturers sought partnerships with foreign firms, often owning them outright, in an effort to circumvent the terms of the Versailles Treaty. The gun was initially developed by Germans engineers employed in a Dutch front company of Rheinmetall, Hollandsche Industrie- en Handelsmaatschappij (H.I.H., informally also "Haiha") which is better known as HIH Siderius.

The ST-5 fired the 'Long Solothurn' ammunition, the cartridge 20 × 138 mm. B. The cartridge case was 138 mm long, making it the most powerful 20 mm round available.

== Users ==
- Nazi Germany - While Germany did not adopt the ST-5, the Kriegsmarine did acquire a version of the weapon for ship-board air defense. The weapon was designated 20 mm C/30 and equipped several German naval vessels during World War II. This weapon was further refined for the other German forces as the 2 cm Flak 30 described separately.
- Republic of China - During the Second Sino-Japanese War (World War 2 in China), the Chinese Nationalist Army soldiers used the Solothurn ST-5 as the main AA gun. The Solothurn ST-5 firstly joined the Battle of Shanghai and the Battle of Nanking. The Solothurn ST-5 was not only used for anti-aircraft and also used for destroying the Japanese tanks and armored vehicles, so it became the anti-tank gun in the Battle of Taierzhuang and destroyed 15 Japanese tanks in this battle.
- Bulgaria
- Greece

== See also ==
- List of anti-aircraft guns
- 2 cm Flak 30/38/Flakvierling

== Bibliography ==
- Gander, Terry & Chamberlain, Peter (1979). Weapons of the Third Reich: An Encyclopedic Survey of All Small Arms, Artillery and Special Weapons of the German Land Forces 1939-1945. New York: Doubleday. ISBN 0-385-15090-3.
