= Lahti L-36 =

- Type: Semi-automatic rifle
- Place of origin: Finland

Service history
- Used by: Finland
- Wars: World War II; Winter War

Production history
- Designer: Aimo Lahti
- Designed: 1934
- Produced: 1936-1940
- No. built: Unknown

Specifications
- Mass: 5 kg
- Length: 1130 mm
- Barrel length: 540 mm
- Cartridge: 7.62×54mmR
- Caliber: 7.62mm
- Action: Gas-operated
- Feed system: 5 round stripper clips

The Lahti L-36 also simply known as the L-36 was a Finnish gas operated semi-automatic rifle that was designed shortly before the outbreak of World War II.

== History ==
In October 1934, the main designer of small arms for Finnish military, Aimo Lahti was tasked to design a semi-automatic rifle for the Finnish military. In 1936, he presented his first prototype designated as the L-36.

== Design ==
The L-36 was chambered in 7.62×54mmR and could hold 5 rounds in Mannlicher-like designed, non-detachable box magazine which was similar to the magazine design of the Mannlicher M1895. The L-36 had an awkward loading mechanism which required the loader to turn the rifle upside-down, open up the non-detachable box magazine, load a 5-round stripper clip, close magazine cover and arm the rifle by pulling back the lever on top of the rifle. Finnish soldiers found this process hard to do while under fire. Finnish soldiers preferred the Soviet AVS-36 which was lighter at 4.3 kg, had a 15-round detachable box magazine, select fire capability and was more widely available.
