= 20×138mmB =

Type of ammunition

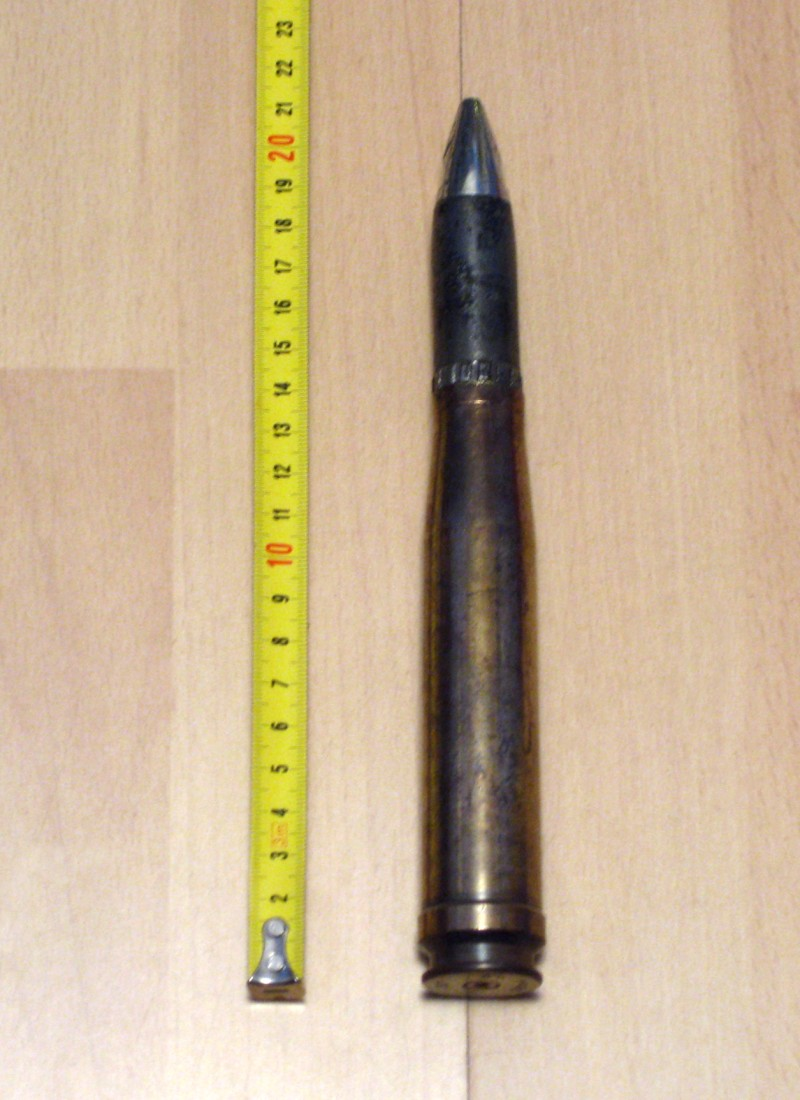
- 20×138B cartridge and a tape measure in centimeters
- Type: Anti-armor/anti-air
- Place of origin: Switzerland

Service history
- Used by: Switzerland, Germany, Italy, Finland, Poland
- Wars: World War II

Production history
- Designed: 1930
- Manufacturer: Swiss Solothurn
- Variants: Long Solothurn

Specifications
- Case type: Bottleneck, belted
- Bullet diameter: 20 mm
- Neck diameter: 20.9 mm (0.82 in)
- Shoulder diameter: 25.5 mm (1.00 in)
- Base diameter: 26.86 mm (1.057 in)
- Rim diameter: 28.48 mm (1.121 in)
- Rim thickness: 26.86 mm (1.057 in)
- Case length: 138 mm (5.4 in)
- Overall length: 202.7 mm (7.98 in)

Ballistic performance
| Bullet mass/type | Velocity | Energy |
|---|---|---|
| 120 grams (4.1 oz) | 900 m/s (2,950 ft/s) | 47,000 J (34,655 ft⋅lb_{f}) |
- Sources: Rifles and Machine Guns

The 20×138mmB or Long Solothurn cartridge is a type of ammunition used mainly for anti-aircraft and anti-tank weapons during World War II. The designation means the caliber is 20 mm, the length of the cartridge case is 138 mm and B indicates it is a belted case. The loaded cartridge weighs 300 grams (10.7 oz).

== History ==
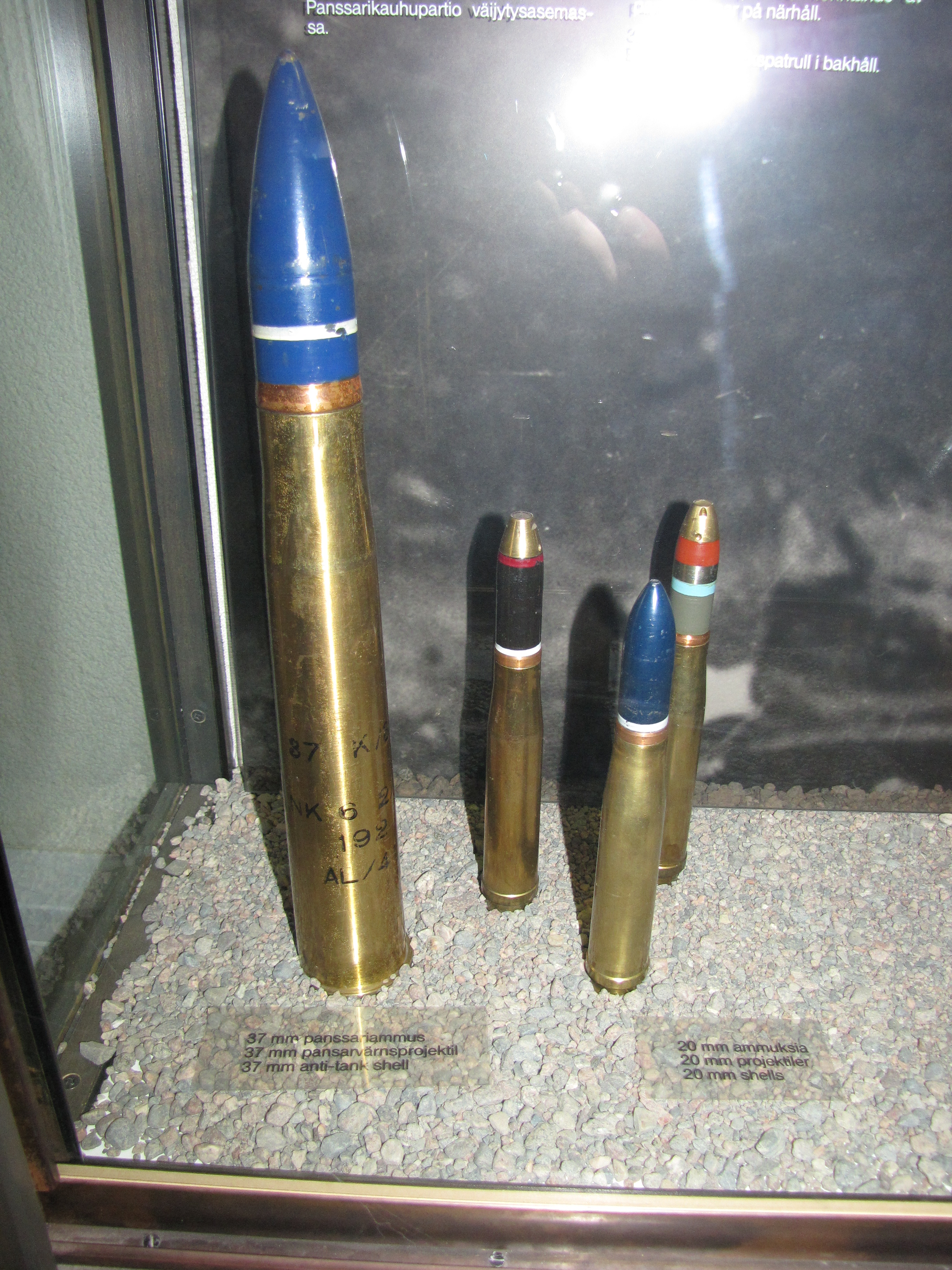
Three Finnish and Italian 20×138B cartridges next to a 37mm anti-tank shell

The 20×138mmB cartridge was developed by the Waffenfabrik Solothurn, a Swiss front company of Rheinmetall in the early 1930s from a less powerful cartridge 20×105mmB cartridge.

== Weapon platforms ==
The 20×138mmB cartridge is used in the following weapons:

=== Switzerland ===
- Solothurn anti-tank rifles: S-18/1000 and S-18/1100
- Solothurn ST-5 20mm AA Gun

=== Germany ===
- FlaK 30 and FlaK 38 single-barrel, and Flakvierling quadruple-barrel anti-aircraft guns
- KwK 30 and KwK 38 vehicle-mounted weapons
- MG C/30L aircraft gun

=== Italy ===
- Cannone-Mitragliera da 20/65 modello 35 (Breda)
- Cannone-Mitragliera da 20/70 (Scotti)

=== Finland ===
- Lahti L-39 anti-tank rifle
- Lahti L-40 anti-aircraft gun

=== Poland ===
- Nkm wz.38 FK anti-tank vehicle-mounted gun
