= Solothurn S-18/1000 =

German anti-tank rifle

Solothurn 20 mm Tb S-18/1000
- Type: Anti-tank rifle, Anti-materiel rifle
- Place of origin: Switzerland

Service history
- Used by: See users
- Wars: World War II

Production history
- Variants: Solothurn S-18/100, Solothurn S-18/1100

Specifications
- Mass: 53.5 kg (118 lbs) (empty)
- Length: 2,200 mm (85 in)
- Barrel length: 1,400 mm (57 in)
- Cartridge: 20×138mmB (Solothurn Long)
- Caliber: 20 mm
- Action: semi-automatic
- Muzzle velocity: 850 m/s
- Feed system: 10 rounds

The Solothurn S18-1000 20 mm was a German anti-tank rifle designed and manufactured in Switzerland and used during the Second World War. It was a variant of the earlier S-18/100 with modifications for a higher muzzle velocity, as well as a larger cartridge size. The more powerful ammunition resulted in significant recoil, which was problematic for the gunner, and its size made portability difficult.

== History ==
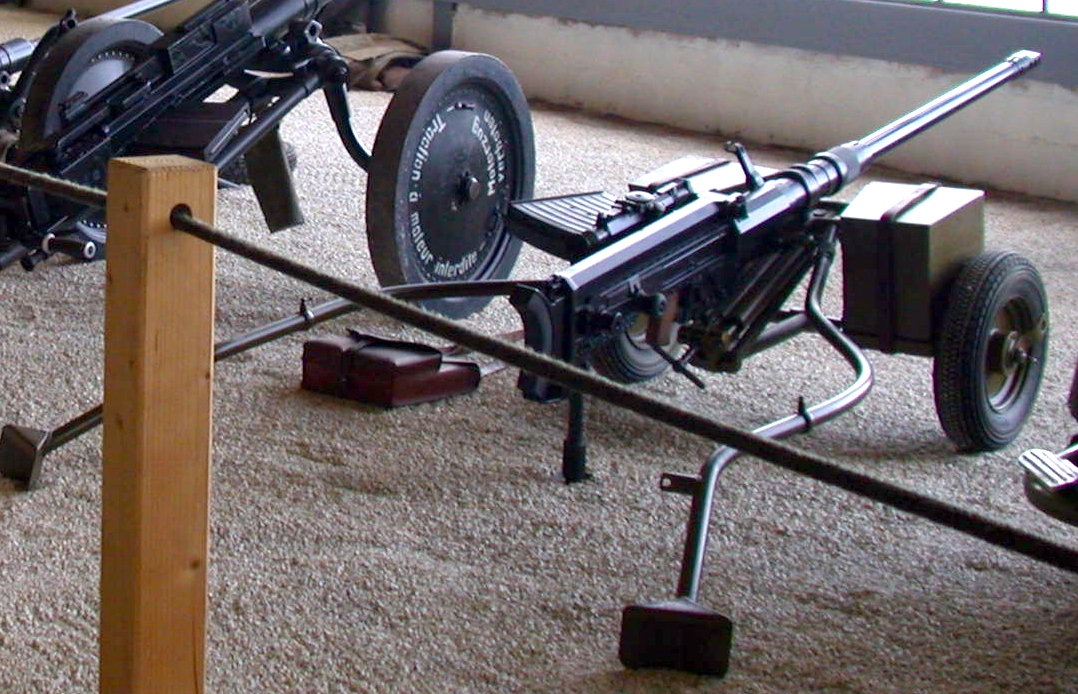
20mm Tankbüchse 40 Solo S18-1000

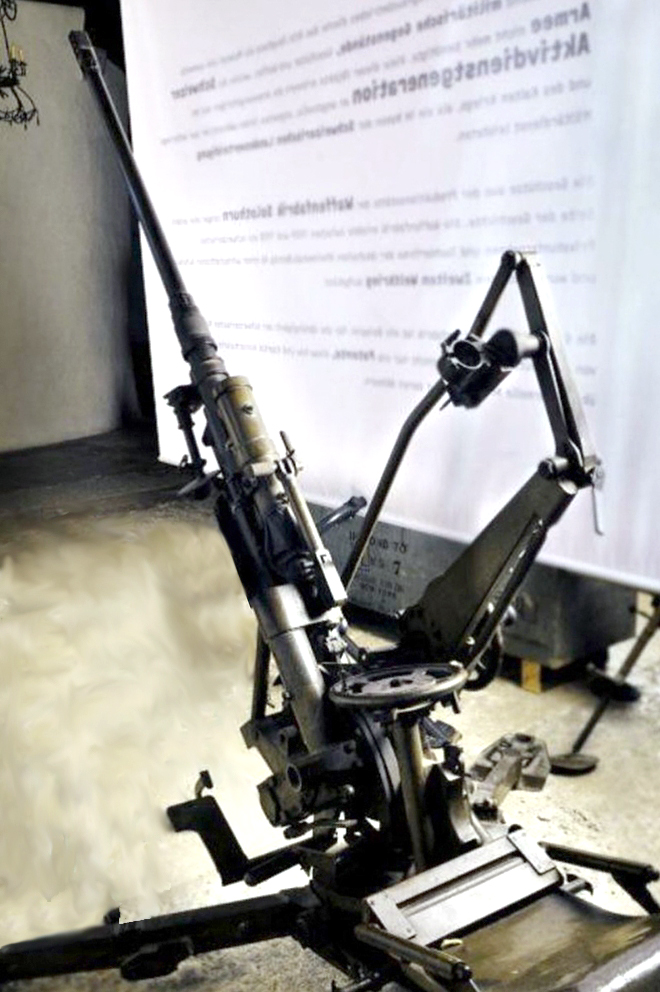
20 mm Solothurn Tankbüchse S18-1100, AA-mount

The Waffenfabrik Solothurn firearms company was owned by the German firm Rheinmetall, who used the Swiss company to manufacture arms which were prohibited for manufacture by any German firm under arms limitations imposed at the end of the First World War.

In 1940–1941 the US Army considered adopting the Solothurn S18-1000. The weapon was standardized for limited procurement as 20mm automatic gun T3. In spring 1941 the Solothurn was tested against the Colt .90-cal. (23mm) T4 automatic gun, an aircraft gun. Although not as powerful, the Solothurn was less bulky and complicated and was found more suitable for army use. Plans were made to acquire 50 pieces, and later to produce the weapon in the US. However, long contract negotiations resulted in abandonment of the purchase.

It was adopted by the Royal Italian Army in 1940, when a first batch was bought from Switzerland; initially known as Carabina "S" (S carbine), from 1942 it was designated as Fucile anticarro "S" (S anti-tank rifle); employed primarily on vehicles and L3-tankettes given its size and weight, it was largely employed in North Africa; after the 8 September 1943 it was also used by the National Republican Army of the Italian Social Republic.

The Royal Netherlands Army used the S18-1000 effectively during the Battle of Maastricht in 1940 during the German invasion of the Netherlands. The Dutch anti tank units equipped with the S18-1000s knocked out multiple tanks and armoured cars during the battle, helping delay the Germans long enough to blow up the two key bridges of Wilhelminabrug and Sint Servaasbrug.

== Specifications ==
- Overall length: S18-1000 and −1100 2,200 mm (85 in). This could vary due to a number of optional muzzle brakes used for different projectile weights.
- Barrel length: 1,300 mm (51 in).
- Muzzle brake's length: 1-hole brake, 25 mm (1 in); 4-hole, 100 mm (4 in); 5-hole, 130 mm (5 in). The brake adds to the overall length of the barrel when installed.

The brakes are changed depending on the recoil force of the rounds being fired. Lighter projectiles require less recoil reduction from the brake to allow the action to cycle. Therefore, the one-hole brake is used for firing high-explosive projectiles, which are much lighter than the armour-piercing variety. The AP projectiles require the 5-hole brake.

- Weight: S18-1000 and −1100 54 kg (118 lb) empty with magazine (1.8 kg (4 lb))
- Cartridge: S18-100 20mmX105B, S18-1000 and −1100 20×138mmB. The B indicates a "belted" round which headspaces on the belt rather than the shoulder, rim or mouth of the case
- Caliber: 20.5mm or .818" (bore diameter is larger than the land diameter of 20mm or .78")
- Action: Recoil-operated semi-automatic for the S18-100 and S18-1000. The S18-1100 was select-fire recoil-operated.
- Magazine capacity: S18-100 5- or 10-round, S18-1000 and −1100 10-round standard, but the weapon could use the 20-round magazines from the Flak 30 anti-aircraft gun.

== Users ==
- Finland: 1 S-18/1100 in 1942
- Italy: as Fucile anticarro tipo S.
- Nazi Germany: as 2cm Panzerabwehrbüchse 785 (i), (h) or (s) (depending if ex-Italian, ex-Dutch or bought from Switzerland)
- Hungary
- Netherlands: 125 delivered to Royal Netherlands Army and 72 to Royal Netherlands East Indies Army
- Switzerland: 93 acquired in 1939, as Tankbüchse Solo 40
- United States: trials by US Army
- Sweden: Between 450-480 units were purchased from Switzerland and given the designation 20mm Pansarvärnskanon M/39
- Provisional Irish Republican Army

== See also ==
- L3/35, for the "L3 cc" anti-tank (controcarro) tank destroyer

== References and external links ==
- Ramon Bill, Waffenfabrik Solothurn, Schweizerische Präzision im Dienste der deutschen Rüstungsindustrie, 2002 by Altes Zeughaus Museum Solothurn.
- Zaloga, Steven J., Brian Delf – US Anti-tank Artillery 1941–45 (2005) Osprey Publishing, ISBN 1-84176-690-9.
- Zaloga, Steven J. (2018). The Anti-Tank Rifle. Oxford, UK: Osprey Publishing. ISBN 978-1-4728-1722-8.
