= Lahti L-39 =

Finnish anti-tank rifle

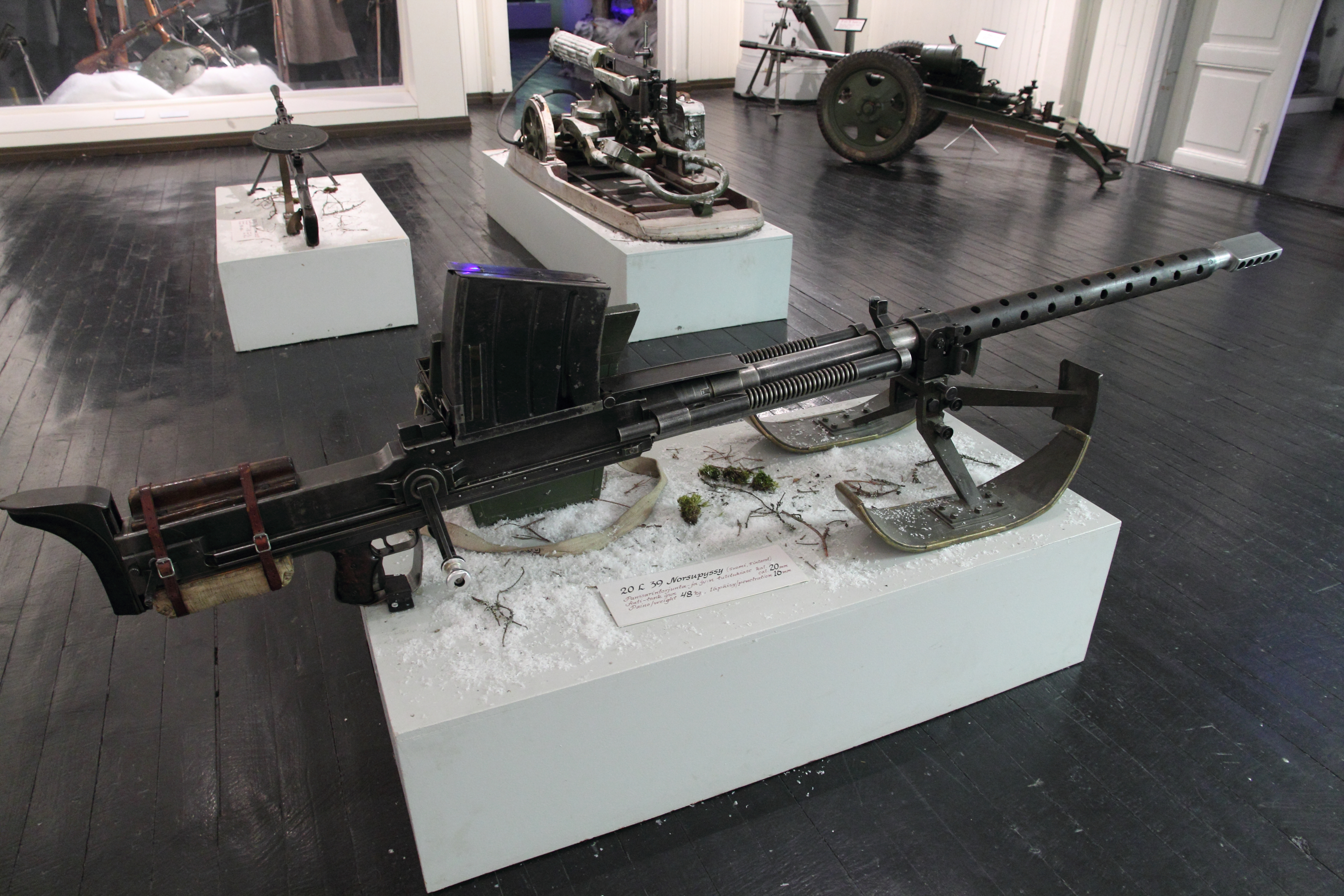
- A Lahti L-39 anti-tank rifle.
- Type: Semi-automatic anti-tank anti-materiel rifle
- Place of origin: Finland

Service history
- In service: 1939–1960 (–1988)
- Used by: Finland
- Wars: Winter War; Continuation War; Lapland War

Production history
- Designed: 1939
- Manufacturer: Valtion Kivääritehdas (VKT)
- Produced: 1939–1944
- No. built: ~1,906
- Variants: L-39/44 anti-aircraft

Specifications
- Mass: 49.5 kg (109 lb)
- Length: 2,200 mm (87 in)
- Barrel length: 51.2 in (1,300 mm)
- Cartridge: 20×138mmB
- Caliber: 20 mm (0.79 in)
- Action: Gas-operated
- Rate of fire: Max. 30/min
- Muzzle velocity: 800 m/s (2,600 ft/s)
- Feed system: 10 round box magazine

The Lahti L-39 is a Finnish 20 mm anti-tank rifle used during the Second World War. It had excellent accuracy, penetration and range, but its size made transportation difficult. It was nicknamed "Norsupyssy" ("Elephant Gun"), and as tanks developed armor too thick for the Lahti to penetrate, its uses switched to long range sniping, tank harassment and with the L-39/44 fully automatic variant, employment as an improvised anti-aircraft weapon.

== Development ==
Aimo Lahti had doubts about the original idea of a 13 mm anti-tank machine gun and started working on a 20 mm design. Officers who wanted smaller caliber anti-tank weapons believed that the muzzle velocities of 20 mm shells were insufficient to penetrate armor, and a weapon with a higher rate of fire and in a smaller caliber would prove useful. As a result, Lahti designed two competing anti-tank weapons: a 13.2 mm machine gun and a 20 mm rifle. After test firing both weapons in 1939, they found that the 20 mm rifle achieved better penetration.

=== Operation ===
The rifle is a semi-automatic, gas operated weapon with the piston located beneath the barrel and ammunition feed from a detachable top-mounted magazine with bottom ejection for the spent cartridges. To reduce recoil, the rifle is equipped with a five-hole muzzle brake and a padded leather recoil pad. The barrel has a wooden jacket to allow for transportation after firing has caused the barrel to heat up.

== Usage ==
=== Winter War ===
During the Winter War (1939–1940) Finland lacked anti-tank weaponry. Only two 20 mm rifles and a few 13.2 mm machine guns made it to the front, where the 13.2 mm machine guns were found to be ineffective and unreliable while the larger 20 mm rifles proved successful against Soviet armor. Because of this, Finland finally settled on the 20 mm design and started production.

The gun was also widely used in the "cold Charlie" counter-sniper technique, where the Finns would use mannequins posing as sloppily-covered officers. Soviet snipers would fire upon the mannequins, and the Finns would then return fire at the Soviet snipers with Lahti L-39s.

=== Continuation War ===
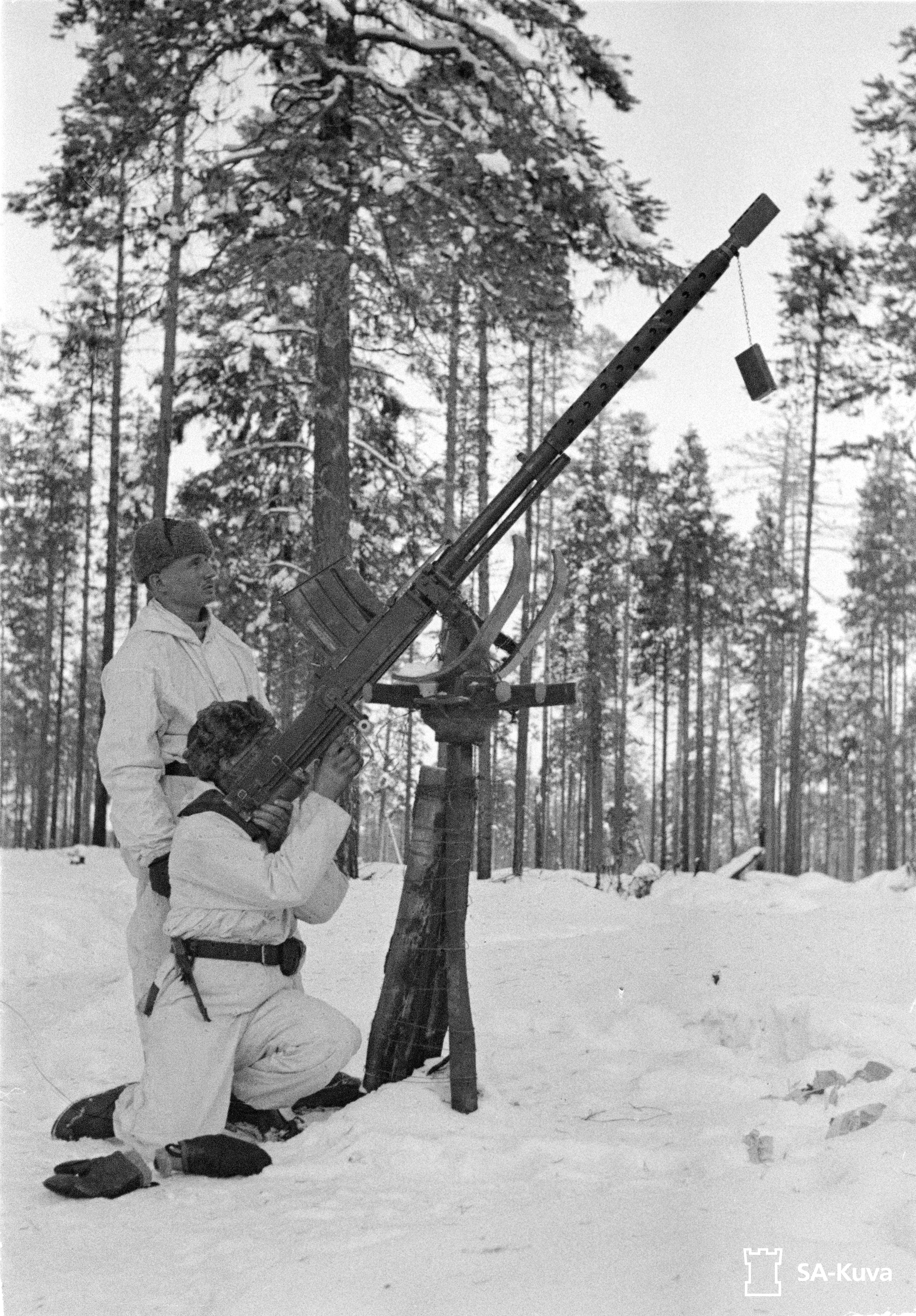
An L-39 being used as an improvised anti-aircraft weapon in 1942

The Continuation War (Finnish: jatkosota, Swedish: fortsättningskriget, 25 June 1941 – 19 September 1944) was the second of two wars fought between Finland and the Soviet Union during World War II.

Although the weapon was not able to penetrate newer Soviet tanks like the T-34 and KV-1, it still proved to be quite effective against bunker loopholes and embrasures, long range targets, and even aircraft. A fully automatic version of the L39 was made in small numbers that served as an anti-aircraft gun. Other good targets were snipers, and several weak spots on tanks, such as open top hatches, especially with phosphorus ammunition. It was even able to damage tank turrets and pin them to stop traversal of the cannons.

Around December 1940, a Lahti L-39 replaced the original 13.2 mm L-35/36 machine gun on the Finnish L-182 armored car. This conversion was employed by the armored unit of 1. Divisioona (English: 1st Division) during 1941.

=== After World War II ===
Several of the rifles remained in service after World War II serving as anti-helicopter weapons, while many others were sold to collectors, mostly in the United States. Today the rifles, especially those in working condition, are quite rare and highly sought after. Some deactivated weapons (with steel bars welded into the chambers) have been reactivated due to their value. Because ammunition is rare, they are often rechambered to .50 BMG to lower the cost of use. In the United States, civilian ownership remains possible, depending on state and federal laws. Because the weapon fires rounds larger than .50 caliber, it is considered a destructive device and is subject to the 1934 National Firearms Act. Civilian ownership is dependent on compliance with this law and whether the individual state prohibits civilian ownership of destructive devices.

=== Details ===
Users found the L-39 to be heavy and difficult to move in the battlefield. Even its magazine weighs almost two kilograms. The magazines have a covered viewing slit on the right side to indicate the number of rounds left in the magazine, and a 15-round magazine was later developed for anti-aircraft use.

To combat the L-39's immense recoil, the recoil spring is so stiff that it would be impossible to cock the weapon with a traditional charging handle. Instead, a rotating crank lever on the right side of the gun, operating a rack and pinion, is used to pull the bolt back. While semi-automatic in function, the L-39's bolt locks back after every shot, and the grip safety also functions to release the bolt. The entire front of the grip and trigger is protected by a large guard and a rubber buffer to protect the operator's hands from the spent casings which eject from the bottom of the gun at very high speeds.

The whole weapon weighs some 50 kilograms and it was usually towed by horses, but when stripped down could be carried by several men. The rifle has adjustable iron sights calibrated between 200 and 1,400 meters and was equipped with an unusual "dual" bipod, with two sets of legs, one with spikes for use on hard ground and the other with skids for use on softer ground or snow.

In the field, a two-man team was assigned to the gun to move and fire it. Some rifles were abandoned in the heat of battle, but they were easy to replace. By the end of the war over 1,900 L39s had been manufactured by VKT (Valtion Kivääritehdas, "State Rifle Factory", modern day Patria) and put in the field.

== See also ==
- Anti-tank rifle
- Boys anti-tank rifle
- Mauser 1918 T-Gewehr
- Nkm wz.38 FK
- Panzerbüchse 39
- PTRD-41 ― Mass-produced competing design to the PTRS
- PTRS-41 ― Mass-produced competing design to the PTRD
- Solothurn S-18/100
- Type 97 automatic cannon
- Wz. 35 anti-tank rifle

== Bibliography ==
- Käkelä, Erkki: Marskin panssarintuhoojat. WSOY, 2000, ISBN 951-02-4638-7
