= Solothurn S-18/1100 =

Switzerland anti-tank rifle

Solothurn S-18/1100 20 mm Anti-Tank Rifle
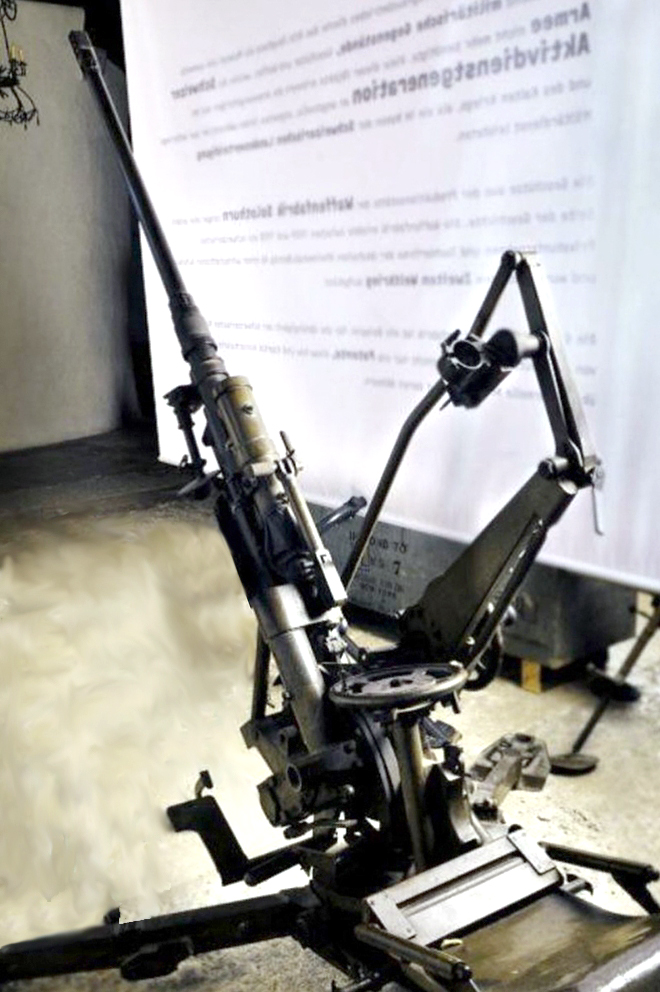
- A 20 mm Solothurn S-18/1100 AA-Mount at the Museum Altes Zeughaus Solothurn, Switzerland.
- Type: Large caliber rifle Anti-tank rifle Anti-aircraft gun
- Place of origin: Switzerland

Service history
- Used by: Switzerland; Hungary; Italy; Nazi Germany; The Netherlands
- Wars: World War II

Production history
- Produced: 1942—early 1943
- Variants: Solothurn S-18/100; Solothurn S-18/1000

Specifications
- Mass: 54.7 kg (121 lb)
- Length: 2.1 m (6 ft 11 in)
- Barrel length: 1.3 m (4 ft 3 in)
- Cartridge: Fixed QF 20×138mmB Rheinmetall
- Caliber: 20 mm (0.79 in)
- Action: Selective fire
- Rate of fire: 15-20 rpm
- Muzzle velocity: 750 m/s (2,500 ft/s)
- Feed system: 5 or 10 round magazine

The Solothurn S-18/1100 was a German 20 mm anti-tank rifle used during the Second World War by a number of combatants.

== History ==
As a result of the defeat of the Central Powers during World War I and the subsequent Treaty of Versailles, Germany was forbidden from developing arms. In order to circumvent these limitations many German arms firms opened foreign subsidiaries or bought controlling interests to continue designing and selling arms. One of these companies was the Swiss Waffenfabrik Solothurn company which was owned by the German firm Rheinmetall.

== Design ==
The S-18/1100 started life as a selective fire variant of the earlier S-18/1000 anti-tank rifle. As a result of its powerful ammunition, the gun had tremendous recoil. Also, its length and weight made portability difficult, so a two-wheeled split-trail carriage was provided. Once towed into position the gun could be fired from the carriage or dismounted and fired from a bipod for the anti-tank role. In the anti-tank role, it was able to penetrate 15–18 mm (0.59–0.71 in) at 300 m (330 yd) (30°). In addition to its anti-tank role it was offered with a collapsible high-angle mount with three outriggers so it could function as a light anti-aircraft gun.

== Service ==
In addition to being used by the Swiss, it also saw service with Hungary as the Tankbuchse, Italy as the Fucile anticarro, Germany as the 2 cm PzB785(s) and The Netherlands as the Geweer tp 18-1100. Guns captured by the Germans were given the designations 2 cm PzB785(h) and 2 cm PzB785(i).
