= Armor-piercing bullet =

Type of ammunition

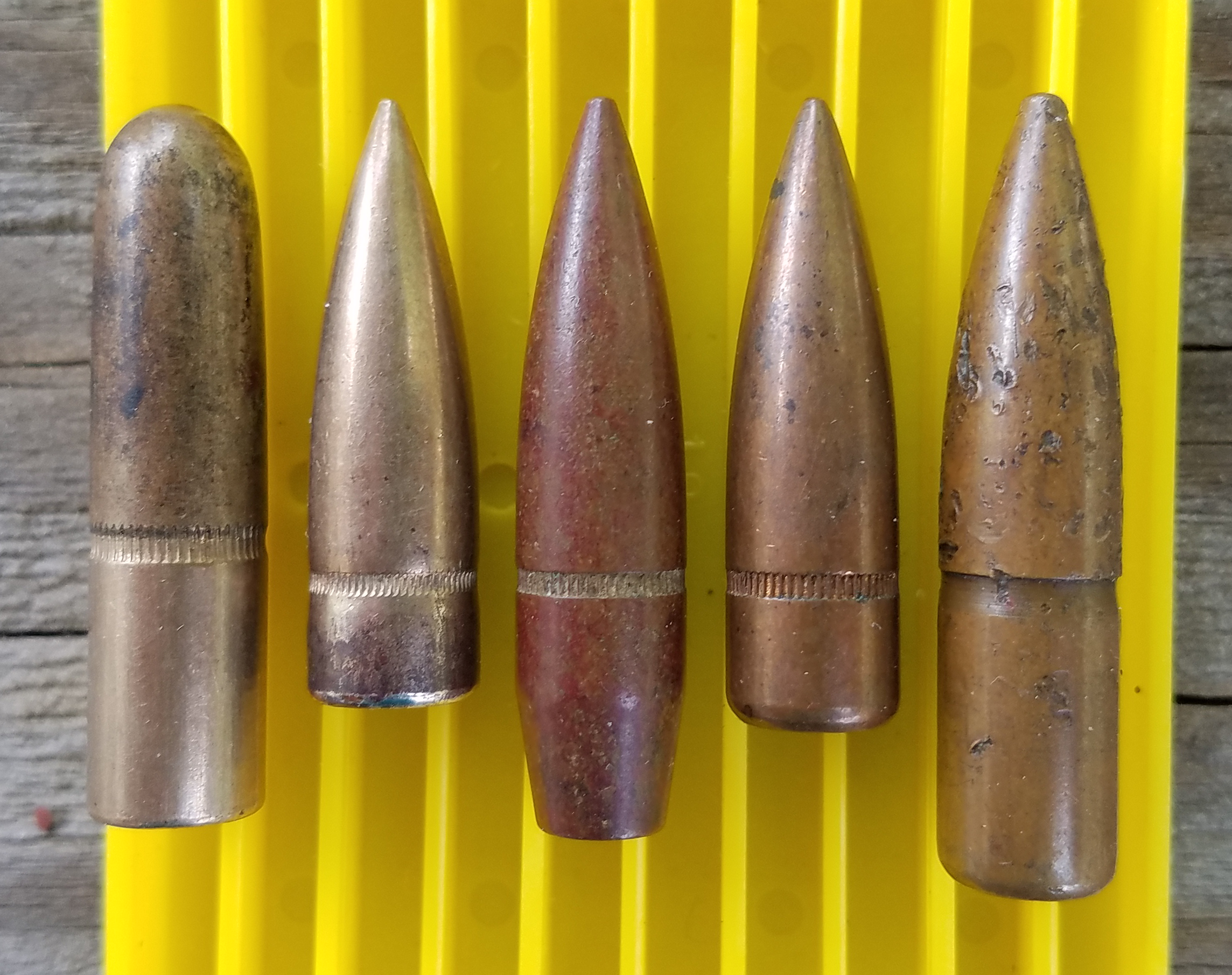
The .30 caliber (7.62 mm) armor-piercing bullet on the right has a copper jacket enclosing a hardened penetrator, but externally resembles the other four lead-core bullets.

Armor-piercing bullets for rifle and handgun cartridges are designed to penetrate ballistic armor and protective shields intended to stop or deflect conventional bullets. Although bullet design is an important factor with regard to armor penetration, the ability of any given projectile to penetrate ballistic armor increases with increasing velocity. Rifle cartridges typically discharge bullets at higher muzzle velocity than handgun cartridges due to larger propellant charge. However, even the same cartridge (one that is interchangeable between specific rifles and handguns) fired from a rifle will, in almost all common cases, have a higher velocity than when fired from a handgun. This is due to the longer period of acceleration available within the longer gun barrel of rifles, which allow adequate time for the propellant to fully ignite before the projectile exits the barrel. For this reason, bullets fired from rifles may be capable of piercing more armor than similar or identical bullets fired from handguns. In addition, a small-caliber bullet has higher sectional density than a larger-caliber bullet of the same weight, and thus is more capable of defeating body armor.

== Design ==
=== Rifle bullets ===
Armor-piercing bullets typically contain a hardened steel, tungsten, or tungsten carbide penetrator encased within a copper or cupronickel jacket, similar to the jacket which would surround lead in a conventional projectile. The penetrator is a pointed mass of high-density material designed to retain its shape and carry the maximum possible amount of energy as deeply as possible into the target. The entire projectile is not normally made of the same material as the penetrator because the hard metals of good penetrators would damage the barrel of the gun firing the bullet. Impact velocity of the copper jacket may temporarily soften the face of the armor and cushion the impact to avoid breaking the brittle penetrator. The penetrator then slides out of the jacket to continue forward through the armor.

==== Examples ====
| Round | Projectile | Weight (grains) |
|---|---|---|
| M2 | .30-06 Springfield | 163 |
| M61 | 7.62×51mm NATO | 150.5 |
| SS190 | FN 5.7×28mm | 31 |
| M995 | 5.56×45mm NATO | 52 |
| M993 | 7.62×51mm NATO | 126.6 |
| 7N13 | 7.62×54mmR | 145.1 |
| S.m.K. | 7.92×57mm Mauser | 178.25 |
| AP485 | .338 Lapua Magnum | 248 |
| 211 Mod 0 | .50 BMG | 650 |

=== Handgun bullets ===
Handgun bullets made entirely of lead have less penetration ability than jacketed bullets at similar velocity. In the 1930s, Western Cartridge Company introduced .38 Special ammunition capable of firing a 158-grain (10.2 g) copper-tipped lead-alloy bullet at 1,125 feet (343 m) per second to penetrate sheet-metal automobile doors. As higher velocity handgun cartridges became available and jacketed bullets became more common in handgun cartridges, armor penetration was improved with thicker bullet jackets or bullets made entirely of jacket material like copper or brass. Later designs used penetrator cores similar to rifle designs. Some of these bullets were coated with Teflon to reduce their tendency to ricochet off glass or sheet metal.

== United States ==
In 1986 United States law initially defined armor-piercing bullets to exempt rifle ammunition:

- A projectile or projectile core which may be used in a handgun and which is constructed entirely (excluding the presence of traces of other substances) from one or a combination of tungsten alloys, steel, iron, brass, bronze, beryllium copper, or depleted uranium; or
- A full jacketed projectile larger than .22 caliber designed and intended for use in a handgun and whose jacket has a weight of more than 25 percent of the total weight of the projectile.

Subsequent regulations requiring green bullets encouraged replacing lead core bullets with M855 military bullets with a copper jacket over a steel core, or hunting bullets of solid copper or brass.
