= K bullet =

German armor-piercing bullet

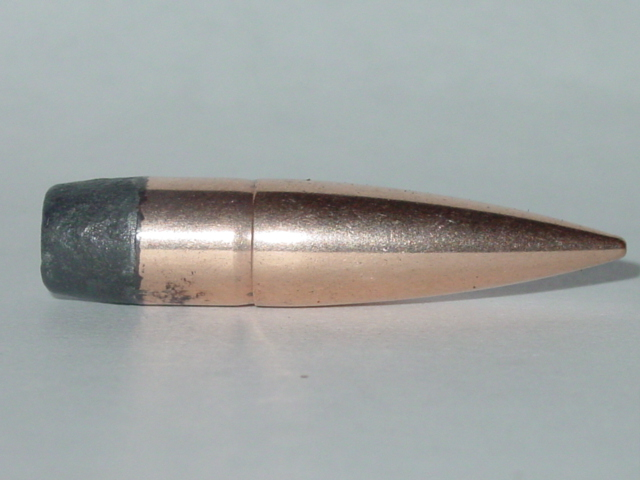
Standard 7.92×57mm Mauser armor-piercing K bullet introduced in mid-1917. Note the tool-steel core protruding from the rear of the bullet to form a boat tail.

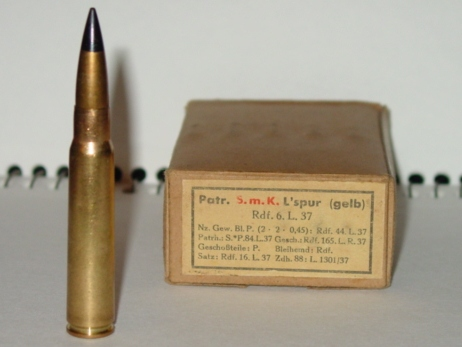
A tracer variation of the K bullet

The K bullet (from German 'Kern', core) was a 7.92×57mm Mauser armor-piercing bullet with a tool steel core designed to be fired from a standard Mauser rifle.

== History ==
The German Army first employed a "reversed bullet" with a heavier powder charge behind it as an early anti-tank method against the British heavy tanks of World War I. This did prove effective against the thinner-armored Mark I tank models, mainly by causing spalling from the inside surface of the armor hit. Reversed bullet loads were however unsafe to use in the standard issue Mauser rifle and thus were unpopular with German troops. They became obsolete with the introduction of more heavily armored tanks.

As a replacement, the Germans conceived the "K bullet", which was purposely developed as an armor-piercing ammunition. The K bullet was in use by the Battle of Messines Ridge in June 1917 and had a one-in-three chance to penetrate 12–13 mm thick armor at a range of up to 100 meters.

With the British deployment of the Mark IV tank, which had more armor thickness, the K bullet soon proved ineffective, leading the Germans to design highly specialized anti-tank solutions, with the creation of the powerful 13.2mm TuF cartridge and the first anti-tank rifle, the Mauser 1918 T-Gewehr.

== Variants ==
The Germans made several versions of the K bullet during World War I and World War II, including:

Designation	Full name	Description
S.m.K.	Spitzgeschoss mit Kern	Standard steel core armour piercing bullet. It had a red rim around the primer, on case base.
S.m.K.H.	Spitzgeschoss mit Kern, Hart	Replaced the tool steel core with a tungsten carbide core. It had a red case base including primer, from 1939: red primer only.
S.m.K. L'spur	Spitzgeschoss mit Kern, Leuchtspur	Has a shorter steel core, and includes a tracer composition. May include color designation such as gelb, German for "yellow". It had a red rim around primer and black bullet tip.
S.m.K. Üb.m.Zerl.	Spitzgeschoss mit Kern Übungsmunition mit Zerleger	A very rare practice bullet which self-destructs after a certain distance.

During the interwar period, Poland produced a copy of S.m.K. bullet designated as P bullet (przeciwpancerny) and own armour piercing bullet with a tracer, designated PS (przeciwpancerny smugowy).
