= Lahti L-35 =

L1935 Lahti Pistol
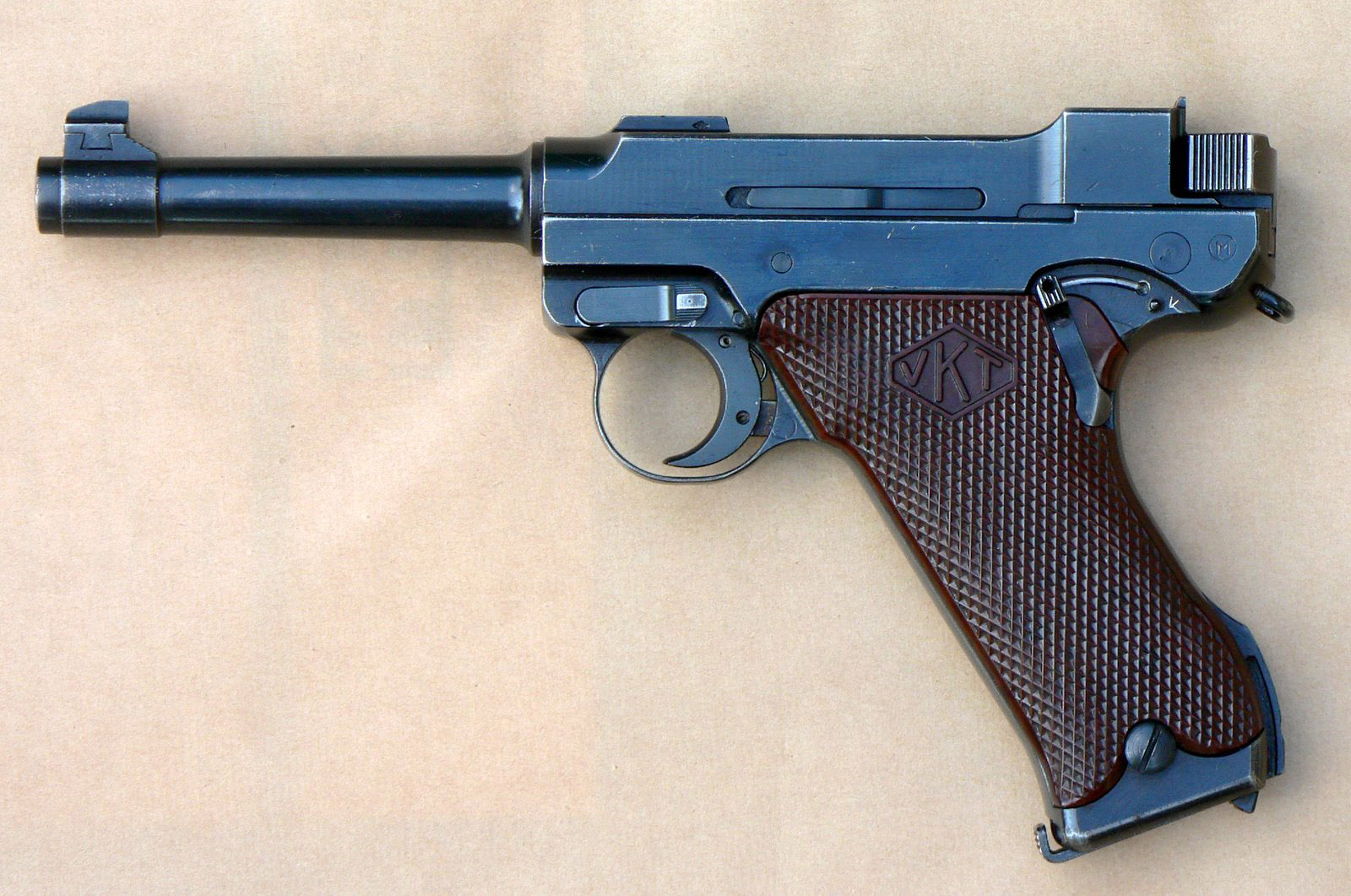
- Type: Semi-automatic pistol
- Place of origin: Finland

Service history
- Used by: Finland; Sweden; Denmark
- Wars: Winter War; World War II; Continuation War; Lapland War

Production history
- Designer: Aimo Lahti
- Designed: 1929
- Manufacturer: Valtion Kivääritehdas (1935–1945); Valmet (1946–1952); Husqvarna Vapenfabriks
- Produced: 1935-1951
- No. built: c.98,700

Specifications
- Mass: 1,250 g (2.76 lb) loaded
- Length: 23.5 cm (9.3 in)
- Barrel length: 11.8 cm (4.6 in)
- Cartridge: 9×19mm Parabellum
- Action: recoil operated, locked breech
- Muzzle velocity: 350 metres per second (1,100 ft/s)
- Feed system: 8-round detachable box magazine
- Sights: front blade, rear notch

The Lahti L-35 is a semi-automatic pistol designed by Aimo Lahti that was produced between 1935 and 1952. Designed to be manufactured autonomously in Finland, the pistol was used by Finland throughout the Winter War and Continuation War. Considered to be of high quality, the Lahti was well manufactured and worked reliably in cold conditions or when fouled. The use of a bolt accelerator, an uncommon feature in a pistol, helped make the Lahti reliable.

A Swedish copy of the L-35 Lahti, the Husqvarna m/40, saw extensive service with the Swedish military until the 1980s. The m/40s had similar design and firing mechanisms to the Finnish L-35s but suffered lower reliability from the lower quality steel used in manufacturing.

== History ==
Following the independence of Finland from Russia in 1917 and the defeat of the Finnish Red Guard during the Finnish Civil War, Finland began the process of replacing its obsolete Russian armament. The efforts to modernize Finland's arsenal included the replacement of Russian Nagant M1895 revolvers with the Spanish Ruby Pistols purchased from France in 1919 and later the German P08 Luger purchased from Deutsche Waffen und Munitionsfabriken in 1923. Finland became intent on autonomously producing its own weaponry with the Finnish Volunteer Guards opening the arsenal, Suojeluskuntain ase- ja Konepaja Oy (SAKO) in 1921 and the Government of Finland opening the Valtion Kivääritehdas (VKT) in Jyväskylä in 1929. The Finnish Army soon called for a domestically produced pistol that could withstand Finland's harsh winters. Design began in 1929 under the supervision of Aimo Lahti and a patent was granted for the M1935 Lahti pistol in 1935. The Lahti was originally designed to fire stockpiled 7.65×21mm Parabellum and 9×19mm Parabellum ammunition but was ultimately restricted to 9mm only. The Lahti pistol became formally adopted in 1935 by the Finnish armed forces as the Pistooli L-35. Production was slow for widespread use with only 500 pistols completed before production was halted by the start of the Winter War. Production continued in 1941 with about 4,500 pistols manufactured before the production was interrupted again by the Continuation War. Final production of Finnish Lahti pistols resumed again in 1946 with around 9,000 completed before 1951.

== Design ==
The M1935 Lahti is considered well manufactured and finished. Although the Lahti is outwardly similar to the P08 Luger (and shares barrel threading with same), the firing mechanism is significantly different and more closely related to the Bergmann–Bayard pistol. The Lahti is a recoil operated, single-action, locked breech firearm fitted with a concealed hammer. The pistol itself is well sealed from dirt and ice but is heavy by modern standards. A manual safety was provided by a lever on the left-hand side of the pistol.

=== Bolt accelerator ===
The addition of a bolt accelerator to the Lahti pistol was to ensure the performance of the pistol in arctic conditions in Finland. Bolt accelerators are more commonly found in machine guns to increase the rate of fire. The bolt accelerator in the Lahti works by having a crank lever strike the bolt of the pistol as it unlocks from firing. This thrusts the bolt mechanically instead of relying on the momentum of firing alone to move the bolt back. The value of the addition of the bolt accelerator was put into question with a batch of guns made without an accelerator being produced. The immediate recall of the pistols without bolt accelerators is thought to indicate the accelerator is not essential but useful in the operation of the gun.

== Lahti Husqvarna m/40 ==
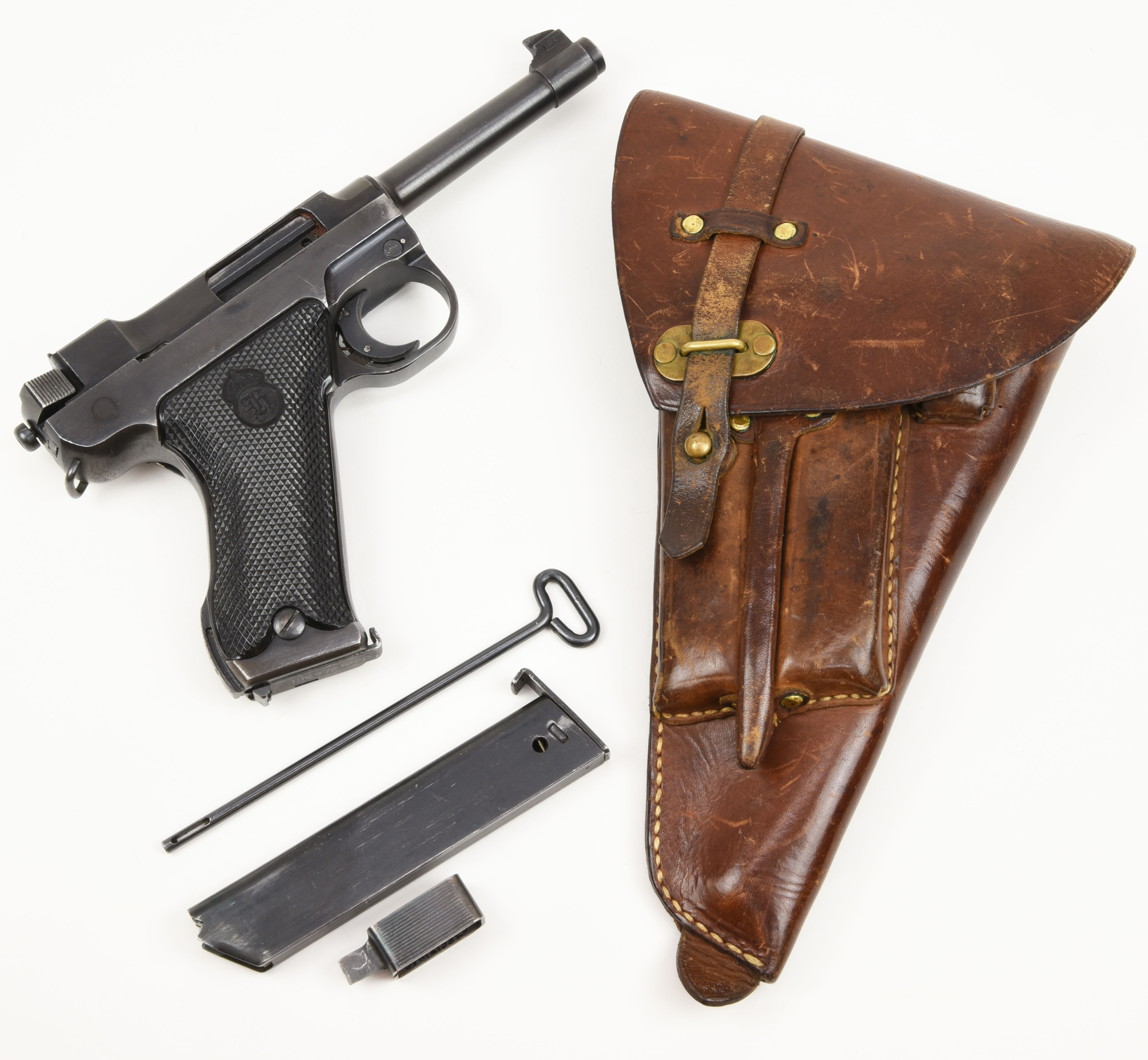
Husqvarna Model 40, a Swedish copy of the Lahti, with holster and spare magazine

The Husqvarna Model 40 or m/40 was manufactured 1940 to 1946 and was a Swedish copy of the Finnish Lahti pistol. The Swedish army realized there would be a shortage of pistols in the event of large scale military mobilization in Europe. Originally adopting the Walther P38 in 1939, Germany's entry into World War II stopped the export of P38s to Sweden. To compensate, Sweden adopted the Lahti pistol but was unable to import L-35-type guns because of the conflicts between Finland and the USSR. Production was licensed to Svenska Automatvapen AB but the immediate collapse of the company passed the contract to Husqvarna Vapenfabriks. The first m/40s were delivered to the Swedish military by 1942 with slight differences from the Finnish L-35 Lahtis. The grips of the m/40 have the Husqvarna "crown H" motif engraved and the front sight was slightly larger. The barrel is also slightly longer on the m/40 than the Finnish Lahti with the m/40's trigger guard being heavier, and the pistol does not have the loaded chamber indicator and lock-retaining spring of the Finnish Lahti. Other modifications included a change in the gun steel quality specifications that were not successful in the m/40s and led to cracks in the frame. Cracking in the frame became more aggravated as the m/39B-ammunition developed for use in the Carl Gustav m/45 submachine gun were used in the pistols. The m/40 would eventually be taken out of service in the 1980s because of the frame cracks with the Husqvarna m/07 being placed back into service as an interim measure being completely replaced by the Glock 17 by the early 1990s.
