= Solothurn S-18/100 =

German/Swiss anti-tank rifle

Solothurn S-18/100 20 mm anti-tank cannon
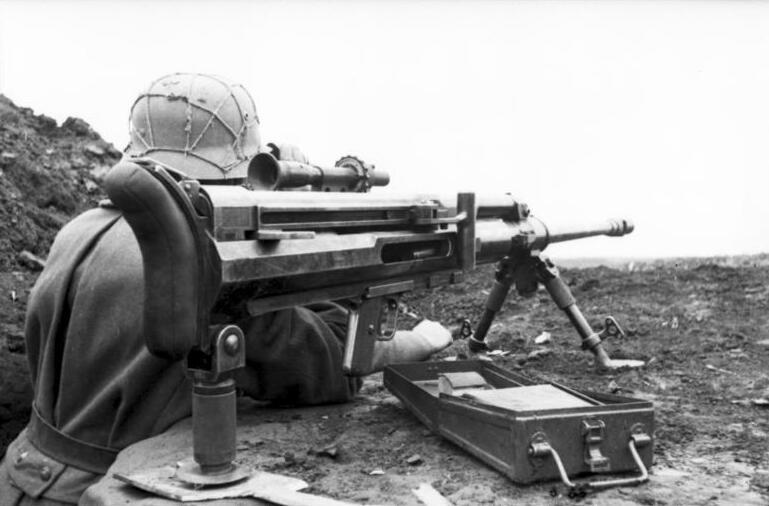
- Hungarian soldier with the Solothurn S-18/100
- Type: Large caliber rifle, anti-materiel rifle
- Place of origin: Nazi Germany; Switzerland

Service history
- Used by: See Users
- Wars: Slovak-Hungarian War; World War II

Production history
- Produced: 1934–1943
- Variants: Solothurn S-18/1000, Solothurn S-18/1100, Solothurn-Arsenal

Specifications
- Mass: 45 kg (99 lb) without magazine
- Length: 1,760 mm (69 in)
- Barrel length: 925 mm (36.4 in)
- Cartridge: 20×105mmB
- Caliber: 20 mm
- Action: API blowback
- Rate of fire: Semi-automatic
- Muzzle velocity: 735 m/s with a Hungarian APHE-T round
- Effective firing range: 400 m (for penetration of 50mm armor)
- Feed system: 10-round detachable box magazine
- Sights: A dedicated scope

The Solothurn S-18/100 20 mm anti-tank cannon was a German and Swiss anti-tank rifle used during the Second World War. It had a semi-automatic action in a bullpup configuration. As a result of its large, powerful ammunition, the gun had a tremendous recoil, and its size made portability difficult. The feed was either from a five or (more usually) ten-round magazine that was attached horizontally to the left side of the gun. The gun used 20×105mm belted-case ammunition which it shared with the S 18-350 aircraft cannon that was developed from the rifle. A Finnish source gives armour penetration of the gun (probably achieved with the Hungarian APHE-T round, since it was the only type used in Finland) as 20mm at a 60-degree angle at 100-metre distance, decreasing to 16mm at 500 metres. A variant of this design, the Solothurn-Arsenal, was manufactured without license in Estonia before WW2; however only 20 were produced prior to Soviet occupation.

In March 1940, with funds collected in Switzerland to help the Finnish war effort in the Winter War, Finland bought twelve S 18-154 anti-tank rifles from Solothurn, though the purchaser was nominally the Swiss army. The weapons arrived in Finland during the spring after the war had ended, but they were later used in the Continuation War. However, the guns were soon found to be obsolete in their intended role. Various models of the S-18 series, including the Solothurn S-18/1000 and the Solothurn S-18/1100 were also used by Switzerland, the Kingdom of Hungary, Nazi Germany, the Kingdom of Italy, and the Netherlands.

The Waffenfabrik Solothurn firearms company was owned by the German firm Rheinmetall, and used the Swiss company to manufacture arms which were prohibited for manufacture by any German firm to get around arms limitations imposed upon them at the end of the First World War.

== Solothurn-Arsenal ==
The Solothurn-Arsenal was a reverse-engineered copy of the S-18/100, manufactured without license in Estonia between 1938 and 1940. Apart from the prototypes, only 20 were produced and deployed with the 1st and 7th Infantry Regiment by the time of the Soviet invasion in 1940.

== Gallery ==
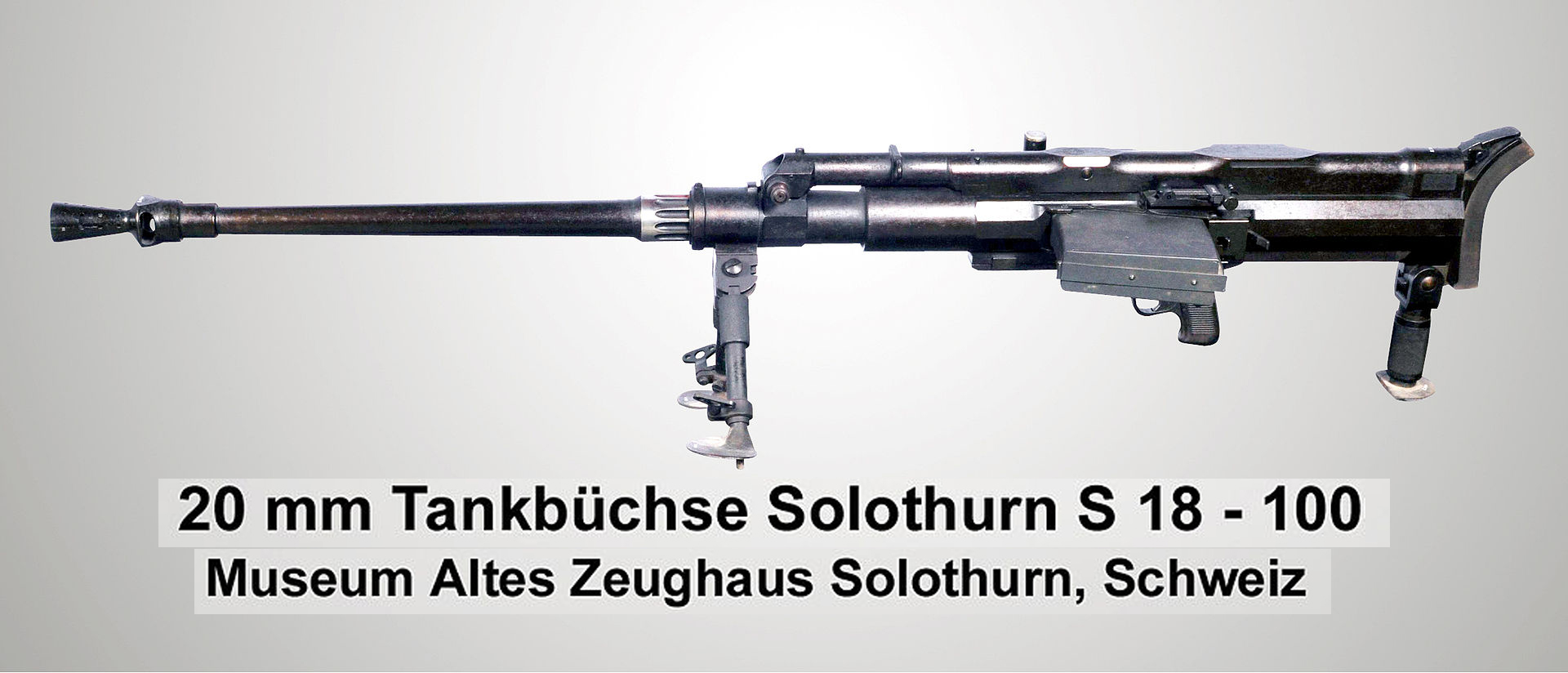
20 mm Tankbüchse Solothurn S-18/100

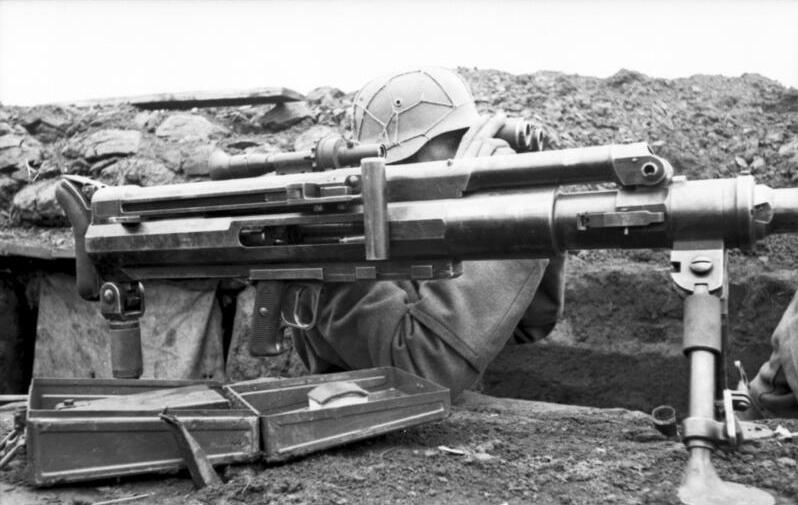
Soldier in Russia, S-18/100

== Users ==
- Bulgaria - 308 ordered in 1936
- Estonia: 4 bought in 1936 for testing, reverse-engineered as Solothurn-Arsenal
- Finland: 12 S-18/154
- Germany: some for trials
- Japan: 1 S-18/100 bought in 1936 for comparison with type 97 automatic cannon
- Hungary: Produced under license as 36M 20mm Nehézpuska and used extensively throughout WW2. Used on 38M Toldi light tank and 39M Csaba armored car.
- Italy: some for trials in 1934
- Netherlands: 6 for trials in 1937
- Switzerland: some for trials
- United States: 2 S-18/100 purchased in 1939 for trials at Aberdeen Proving Ground
- Yugoslavia

== See also ==
- List of API blowback firearms
- Anti-tank rifle
- Boys anti-tank rifle
- Lahti L-39
- Mauser 1918 T-Gewehr
- Panzerbüchse 39
- PTRD-41 ― Mass-produced competing design to the PTRS
- PTRS-41 ― Mass-produced competing design to the PTRD
- Type 97 automatic cannon
- Wz. 35 anti-tank rifle
- Weapons employed in the Slovak–Hungarian War
