= Reversed bullet =

World War I German anti-tank bullet

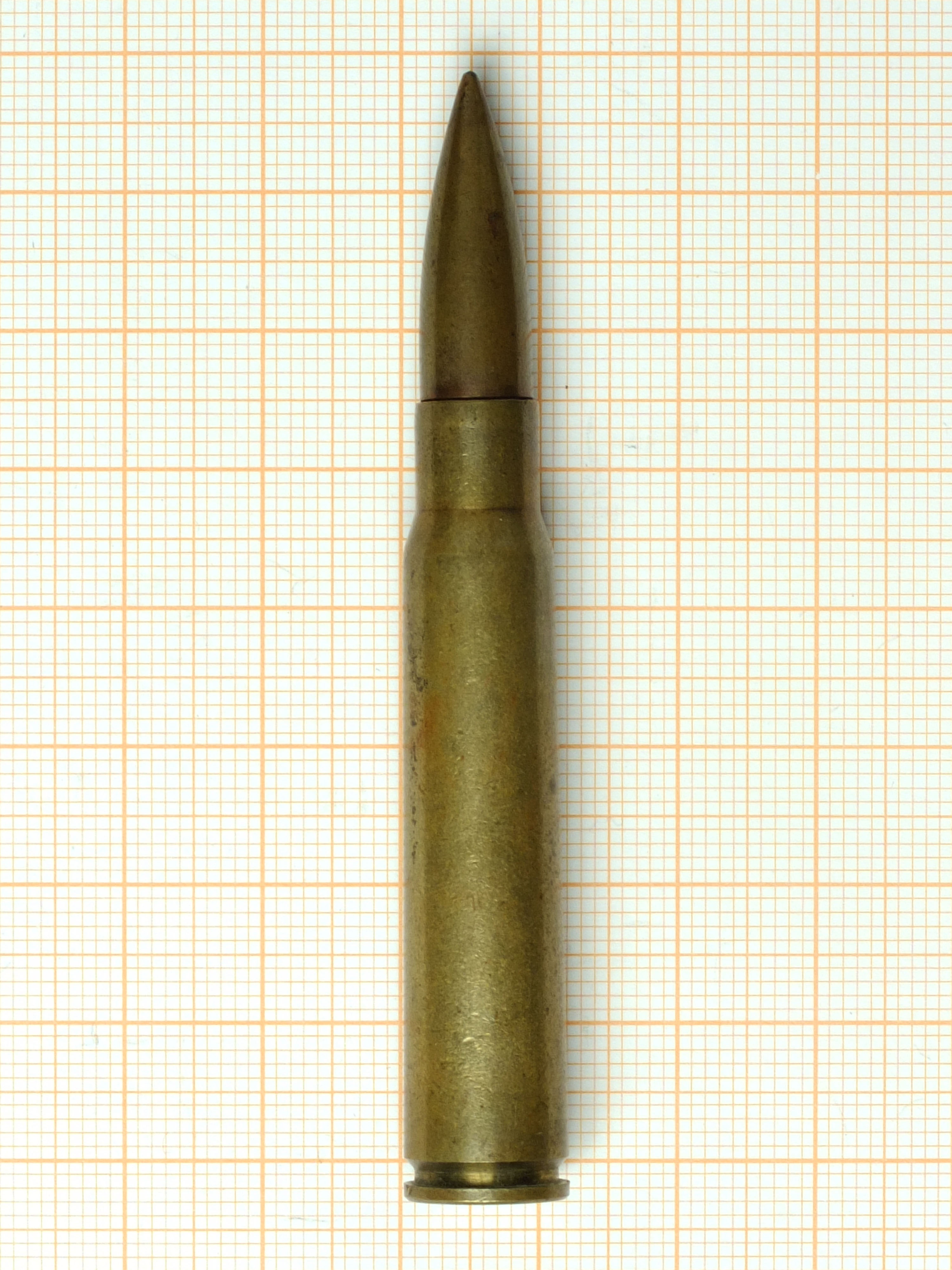
7.92×57mm Mauser cartridge used by the Gewehr 98 rifle

A reversed bullet was a German anti-tank method for penetrating the armor of the British heavy tanks of World War I.

== History ==
At their inception in 1916, the British Mark I tank proved nearly impenetrable to standard rifle fire. The first attempt at boosting the power of German infantry rifles was the "reversed bullet". This used the same case and bullet as a normal round, except with the bullet seated backward and additional propellant added to the 7.92×57mm Mauser cartridge. When fired, the blunt end of the bullet hit the target first. The bullet did not as readily deflect or break apart against armor plating as a normal bullet would, but transferred most of its kinetic energy to the steel plate on impact. Used against World War I tanks, the reversed bullet sometimes penetrated into the tank compartment, but more often it severely indented the plate armor of the tank. This caused a spray of metal fragments (spall) that injured or killed the crew of the tank as effectively as full penetration into the tank compartment. At short range, armor required a minimum thickness of .50 in (13 mm) in order to stop a reversed bullet. The allies spread stories that reversed bullets were illegal, improvised, expanding bullets used by Germans against French infantry at short ranges. German reversed bullets were, however, factory loaded and offered no advantage over non-reversed bullets if used against infantry.

The reversed bullet sometimes damaged German rifles, often injuring its users. This made it unpopular with German infantry. Later in World War I, the Germans developed the armor-piercing K bullet for use against heavier British tanks.

== See also ==
- Glossary of firearms terms
- Hollow-point bullet
- Military necessity
