= Lahti-Saloranta M/26 =

Lahti-Saloranta M/26 LMG
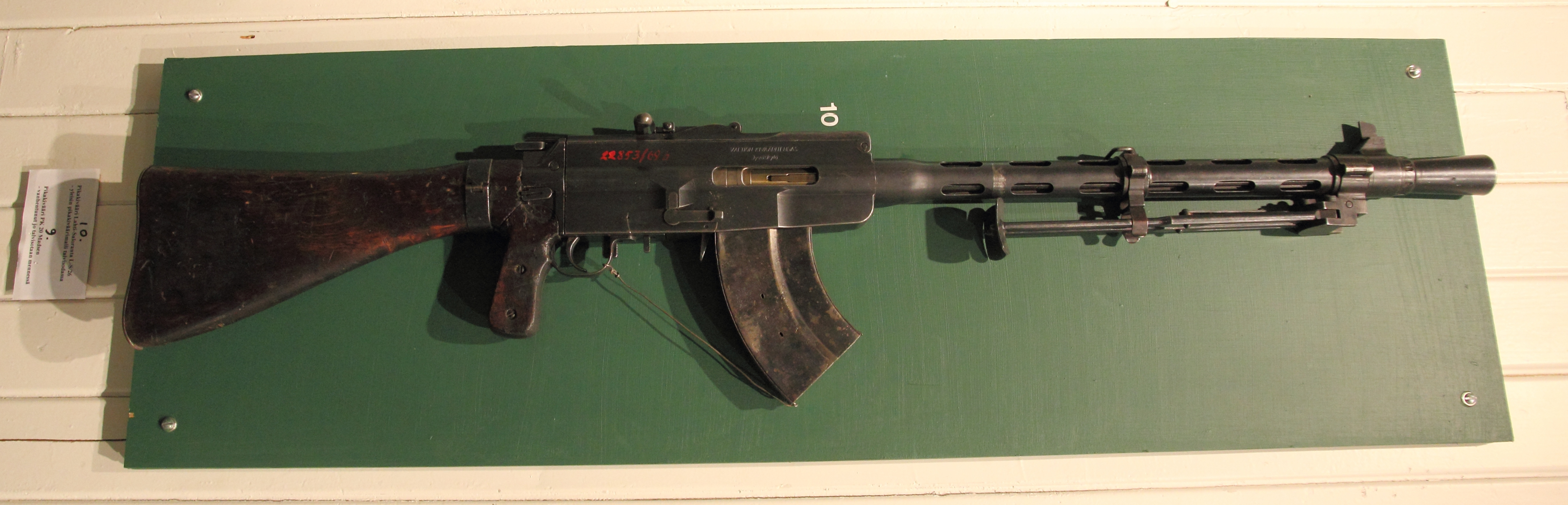
- A Lahti-Saloranta M/26 LMG with a 20-round magazine
- Type: Light machine gun
- Place of origin: Finland

Service history
- In service: 1930–1970s
- Wars: Winter War; Second Sino-Japanese War; Continuation War; Lapland War

Production history
- Designer: Aimo Lahti & Arvo Saloranta
- Designed: 1925
- Manufacturer: Valtion kivääritehdas
- No. built: > 6200
- Variants: LS-26-31 (able to accommodate the 75-round drum magazine)

Specifications
- Mass: 9.3 kg (20.5 lbs)
- Length: 1,109 mm
- Barrel length: 500 mm
- Cartridge: 7.62×53mmR & 7.92×57mm
- Action: Short-recoil operation
- Rate of fire: 450 to 550 round/min
- Muzzle velocity: 800 m/s (2,624 ft/s)
- Effective firing range: 400 m
- Feed system: 20-round box and 75-round drum magazine

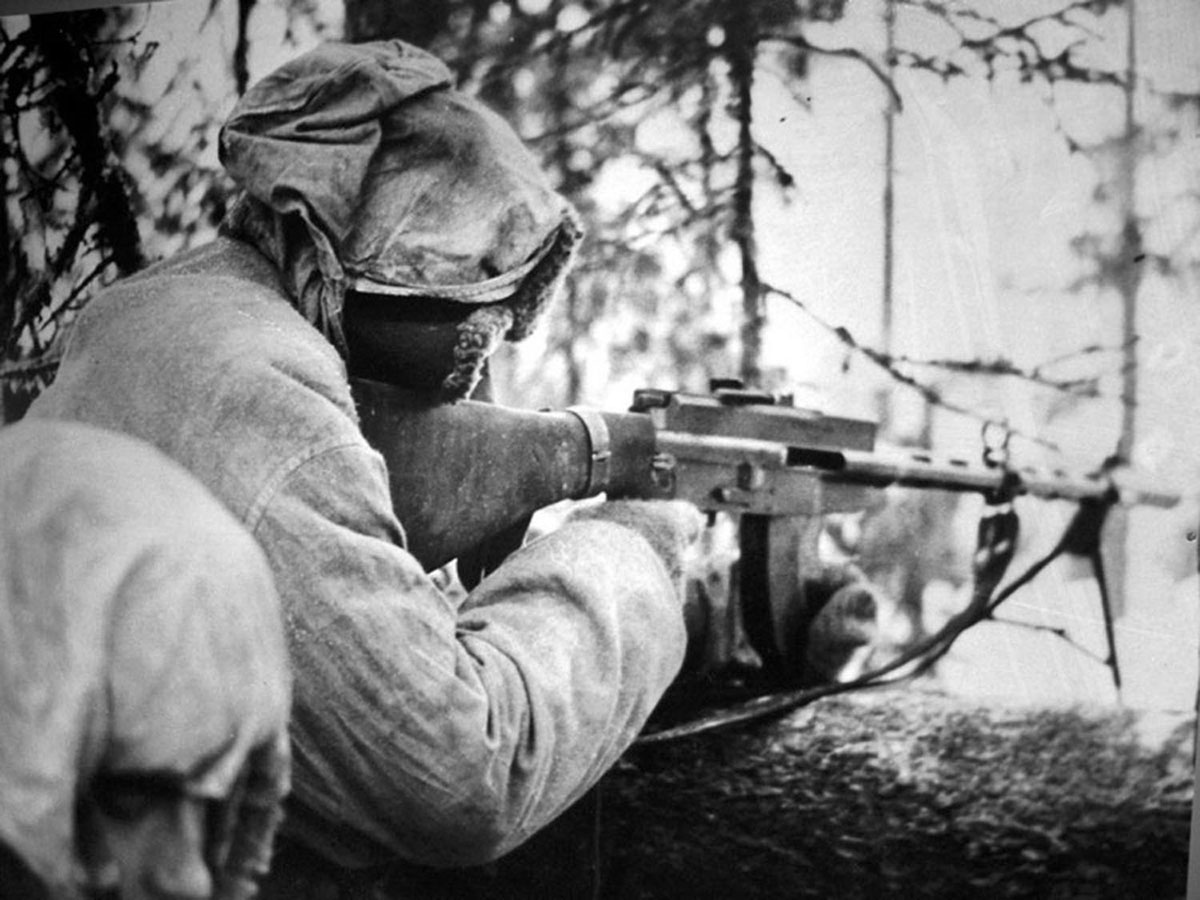
A Finnish soldier equipped with a Lahti-Saloranta M/26 during the Winter War.

The Lahti-Saloranta M/26 (alternatively LS/26) is a light machine gun which was designed by Aimo Lahti and Arvo Saloranta in 1926. The weapon was able to fire in both full automatic and semi-automatic modes. Both 20-round box and 75-round drum magazines were produced, but the Finnish Army seems to have only used the smaller 20-round magazine.

In the Winter War, there were two squads in each platoon that provided covering fire for two ten-man rifle squads. In each squad, there was one M/26 gunner, one assistant and the rest of the men carrying rifles. Soldiers found it would jam when magazine was loaded to capacity. Often they would take a round out of the magazine and hope an officer did not inspect it.

== History ==
The M/26 won a Finnish Army competition in 1925 where it was selected as the army's main light machine gun. Production started in 1927 at the Valtion kivääritehdas (VKT), State Rifle Factory, and lasted until 1942. More than 5,000 weapons were produced during that time. China also placed an order for 30,000 M/26s chambered for 7.92×57mm Mauser in 1937, but only 1,200 of these weapons were actually delivered due to Japanese diplomatic pressure.

== Design ==
On the battlefield, the Lahti-Saloranta M/26 was found to be heavy, hard to clean due to the 188 parts of the gun, and lacking in magazine capacity. It was nicknamed Kootut virheet, "assorted mistakes". On the other hand, proficient gunners liked and took full advantage of the exceptional accuracy of the weapon, and with oiling adapted for winter, it turned out to be very reliable.

Due to the problems first encountered by Finnish troops, they often preferred the Degtyarev light machine gun when thousands of them were captured from the Soviets and used against their former owners. All in all, in the summer of 1944, only 3,400 M/26s were at the front, compared to over 9,000 Degtyarevs.

== Users ==
- Finland
- Republic of China
