= Aimo Lahti =

Finnish weapons designer (1896–1970)

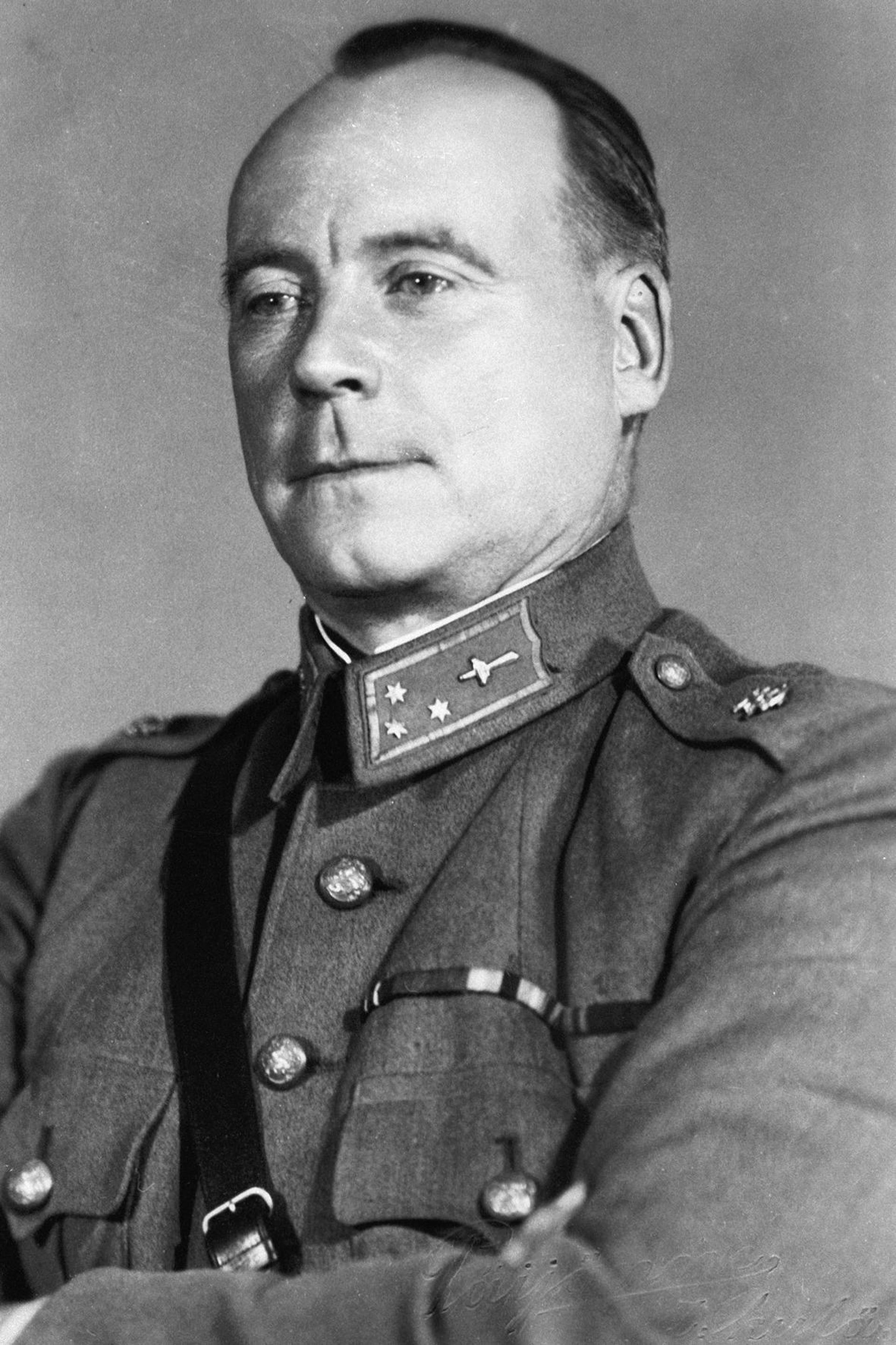
- Aimo Lahti during the Interim Peace in 1940
- Born: Aimo Lahti; April 28, 1896; Viiala, Finland
- Died: April 19, 1970 (aged 73); Jyväskylä, Finland
- Occupations: gunsmith, weapons designer
- Known for: Lahti-Saloranta M/26 machine gun, Suomi KP/-31 submachine gun, Lahti L-35 pistol, Lahti L-39 anti-tank rifle
- Spouse: Ida Lahti

Aimo Johannes Lahti (April 28, 1896 – April 19, 1970) was a self-taught Finnish weapons designer. Of the 50 weapons he designed, the best known is the Suomi KP/-31 SMG. Other well-known weapon designs of his include the Lahti-Saloranta M/26 LMG, Maxim M/32-33 and Sampo L-41 MMG, Lahti L-35 pistol, and Lahti L-39 anti-tank rifle. Lahti also designed the 7,62 ITKK 31 VKT anti-aircraft machine gun and the 20 ITK 40 VKT anti-aircraft cannon.

His work had a decisive role in defending Finnish independence and increasing trust in the reliability of domestic weapons produced there. All of his weapons have been retired since 1988, the last one to retired was Lahti L-39.

== Biography ==
=== Early years ===
Aimo Johannes Lahti was born in Viiala on 28 April 1896, to Evert Williamson Lahti and Ida Sophia Carlsdaughter née Viitanen, the oldest of five boys. He had a safe and somewhat wild childhood. Lahti did not enjoy school and left after the sixth year of elementary school. He started working in the Viiala glass factory when he was 13 years old. In the same year, he bought his first weapon, a Berdan rifle, with five marks he had earned in the factory. Lahti was fascinated by the rifle’s mechanism and visited local gunsmith Säteri with whom he examined the weapon closely. Aimo Lahti visited him several times, becoming familiar with weapon mechanisms. Lahti served his conscription in central Finland’s regiment during 1918 and 1919. On October 20, 1919, he married Ida Dagmar Lassila (1 December 1890 – 27 October 1968) with whom he had a son, Olavi Johannes Lahti. Olavi was later a pilot in the Finnish Air Force and died in 1944.

=== Master Armorer in the Finnish Army ===
After working for the railway Aimo Lahti joined the Finnish Army as a Master Armorer in 1921. He was influenced in this decision by Captain Rosenholm. In 1922, he started to design the Suomi M-31 SMG after examining the Bergmann MP18, which had many design problems and was expensive. The new design was revolutionary because the reliability, accuracy, and rate of fire were excellent. The first 200 Suomi SMGs were produced in 1922. After the prototypes were made, he was ordered to work under the control of the Ministry of Defence and to design a light machine gun, which eventually would be the Lahti-Saloranta M/26. He then improved the Mosin–Nagant rifle by designing the M/27 "Pystykorva" "Spitz", named for its foresight guards' resemblance to the dog breed's ears. This rifle was later issued to the Finnish Army as their service rifle.

In 1932 Lahti and the Ministry of Defence signed two important agreements about Lahti's earnings and other economic benefits. It also gave the government rights to use and sell his designs. In the same year, he got an offer to move to an American weapon company. He was offered a check for 3 million marks and a five percent commission on the weapons that would have been produced in the United States. On the same day the Ministry reformed his older contract. Lahti received more benefits and rights to his inventions and therefore did not feel that moving to the United States was a better offer.

Lahti continued to design weapons until the end of the Continuation War when the Allied Control Commission questioned him about the lost 30 assault rifles that he was designing and other topics. The commission banned him from working as a weapon designer anymore. He enjoyed a Finnish Army’s Major General’s pension after the age of 50, until his death in 1970 in Jyväskylä at the age of 73.
