= Waffenfabrik Solothurn =

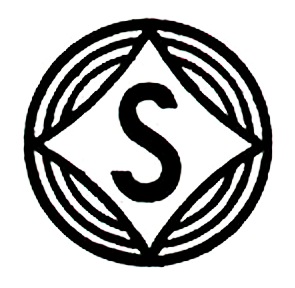
- Industry: Armament manufacturing
- Predecessor: Patronenfabrik Solothurn AG
- Founded: 1929; 97 years ago
- Defunct: 1949
- Headquarters: Zuchwil (SO), Switzerland
- Key people: Fritz Mandl; Hermann Obrecht

Waffenfabrik Solothurn Aktiengesellschaft (English: War Material Manufacturing Company Solothurn) abbreviated as WFS was a Swiss armament manufacturing company based in Zuchwil, Switzerland. Established in 1929 as an Austrian-German joint venture between industrialist Fritz Mandl and the Rheinmetall concern, it existed until it was liquidated in 1949.

== See also ==
- Solothurn S-18/100
- Solothurn S-18/1000
  - Solothurn S-18/1100
