= Valtion Kivääritehdas =

Finnish state-owned firearms manufacturer

- Type: Government-owned company
- Industry: Firearms
- Founded: 1926
- Defunct: 1946
- Fate: Consolidated into Valmet
- Headquarters: Jyväskylä, Finland

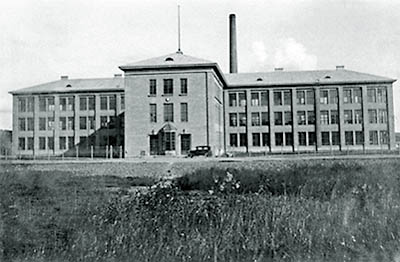
Valtion Kivääritehdas in 1927.

Valtion Kivääritehdas (VKT), State Rifle Factory in English, was a Finnish state-owned firearms manufacturer that existed independently in the Tourula district of Jyväskylä in Finland from 1926 to 1946.

The first serial product in the factory was the Lahti-Saloranta M/26 light machine gun. Other military firearms included the Lahti L-35 pistol and the Lahti L-39 20 mm anti-tank rifle. During World War II, production was decentralized to Seppälänkangas depot and SOK-owned factories in Vaajakoski.

After the war in 1946, VKT was consolidated into the government-owned Valtion metallitehtaat conglomerate that became Valmet in 1951 and the unit was named just Tourula factory. The factory still produced sport and hunting rifles, but the main focus shifted to building industrial machines and tractors. Finally, Valmet's Tourula factory was merged with SAKO to form Sako-Valmet Oy in 1986. Production in Tourula ended in the late 1990s.
