= M1921 Browning machine gun =

US heavy machine gun

The M1921 Browning machine gun was a water-cooled .50-caliber (12.7 mm) machine gun designed by John Moses Browning. Development began in 1917 when Browning scaled up his .30-caliber M1917 to chamber a .50-caliber round, resulting in a prototype tested in 1918. The M1921 entered limited service with the United States Army and Navy in the late 1920s, and was succeeded by the M2 Browning in 1933.

== History ==
Machine guns were heavily used in World War I, and weapons of larger than rifle caliber began appearing on both sides of the conflict. The larger rounds were needed to defeat the armor that was being introduced to the battlefield, both on the ground and in the air. During World War I, the Germans introduced a heavily armored airplane, the Junkers J.I. The armor made aircraft machine guns using conventional rifle ammunition (such as the .30-06) ineffective.

Consequently, the American Expeditionary Force's commander General John J. Pershing asked for a larger caliber machine gun. Pershing asked the Army Ordnance Department to develop a machine gun with a caliber of at least 0.50 inches (12.7 mm) and a muzzle velocity of at least 2,700 feet per second (820 m/s). U.S. Col. John Henry Parker, commanding a machine gun school in France, observed the effectiveness of a French 11 mm (0.43 in) Gras incendiary round, the so-called balloon buster. The Army Ordnance Department ordered eight experimental Colt machine guns rechambered for the French 11 mm cartridge. The French 11 mm round was found to be unsuitable because its velocity was too low. Pershing wanted a bullet of at least 670 gr (43 g) and a muzzle velocity of 2,700 ft/s (820 m/s). Development with the French round was dropped.

Around July 1917, John M. Browning started redesigning his .30-06 M1917 machine gun for a larger and more powerful round. Winchester worked on the cartridge, which was a scaled-up version of the .30-06. Winchester initially added a rim to the cartridge because the company wanted to use the cartridge in an anti-tank rifle, but Pershing insisted the cartridge be rimless. In order to adapt his machine gun to .50 cal Browning had to introduce a proper hydraulic recoil buffer instead of a cheaper stack of fiber disks on .30-cal M1917 and M1919 which he also tried on the M1921, as well as breech block cushioning.

The first .50 caliber machine gun underwent trials on 15 October 1918. It fired at less than 500 rounds per minute, and the muzzle velocity was only 2,300 ft/s (700 m/s). Cartridge improvements were promised. The gun was heavy, difficult to control, fired too slowly for the anti-personnel role, and was not powerful enough against armor.

While the .50 caliber was being developed, some German T Gewehr 1918 anti-tank rifles and ammunition were seized. The German rounds had a muzzle velocity of 2,700 ft/s (820 m/s), an 800 gr (52 g) bullet, and could penetrate armor 1 in (25 mm) thick at a range of 250 yd (230 m). Winchester improved the .50 caliber round to have similar performance. Ultimately, the muzzle velocity was 2,750 ft/s (840 m/s).

Both the US Army and the US Navy adopted the M1921 after World War I, using it mostly as a static anti-aircraft weapon due to its 121 lb (55 kg) weight.

A slightly improved version, the M1921A1, was introduced in 1930 with all of the M1921s being upgraded. The gun weighed 79 lb (36 kg) without water, was 56 in (1.4 m) long, and had a 36-inch (0.91 m) long barrel. The gun was mounted on a pedestal mount with three horizontal legs. It had a 500-650 rounds per minute rate of fire.

Development continued and the M1921A1 was replaced by the water-cooled .50-caliber M2 Browning in 1933. Ground and aircraft air-cooled versions of the M2 were also adopted in 1934.

== See also ==
- List of crew-served weapons of the U.S. Armed Forces
- List of individual weapons of the U.S. Armed Forces
- List of U.S. Army weapons by supply catalog designation
- M2 Browning
- .50 BMG
- MG 18 TuF

== General bibliography ==
- Chinn, George M. (1951), The Machine Gun: History, Evolution and Development of Manually Operated, Full Automatic, and Power Driven Aircraft Machine Guns, vol. 1, Department of the Navy, Bureau of Ordnance
