= MG 08 =

German machine gun

Maschinengewehr 08
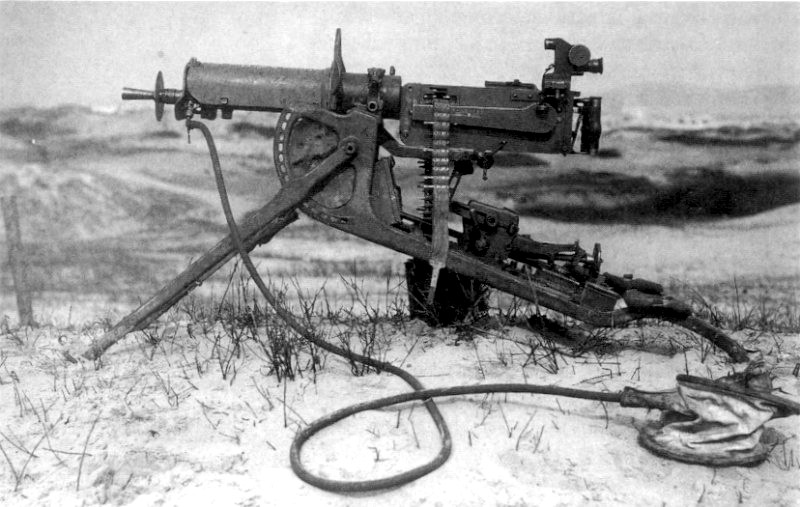
- MG 08 deployed in sandy terrain
- Type: Heavy machine gun
- Place of origin: German Empire

Service history
- In service: 1899–1945 (Germany); 1911–1980s (Switzerland); 1935–1960s (China)
- Used by: See § Users
- Wars: See § Conflicts

Production history
- Designer: DWM; Mauser (MG 18 TuF)
- Manufacturer: See § Manufacturers
- Developed from: Maxim gun
- No. built: German Maxims: 225,000 (Note: MG 08: 72,000, MG 08/15: 130,000, lMG 08/15: 23,000, MG 18 TuF: 50); Swiss MG 11:10,000 (Note: by DWM and W+F Bern)
- Variants: See § Variants

Specifications (MG 08)
- Mass: 69 kg (152 lb 2 oz) (complete) (Note: Gun: 26.5 kg (58 lb 7 oz) with 38.5 kg (84 lb 14 oz) tripod and 4 kg (8 lb 13 oz) of water)
- Length: 1,175 mm (46.26 in)
- Barrel length: 721 mm (28.39 in)
- Crew: 4
- Cartridge: 7.92×57mm Mauser; 7.65×53mm Mauser; 7×57mm Mauser
- Action: Short recoil, toggle locked
- Rate of fire: 450–500 rounds/min
- Muzzle velocity: S. Patrone: 878 m/s (2,880 ft/s); s.S. Patrone765 m/s (2,510 ft/s)
- Effective firing range: 2,000 m (2,190 yd)
- Maximum firing range: S Patrone: 3,700 m (4,050 yd); s.S. Patrone: 4,700 m (5,140 yd)
- Feed system: 250-round cloth belt; 500-round cloth belt (aircraft)

The MG 08 (German: Maschinengewehr 08, lit. 'Machine gun 08') is a heavy machine gun (HMG) which served as the standard HMG of the Imperial German Army during World War I. It was an adaptation of Hiram Maxim's 1884 Maxim gun design, and was produced in a number of variants during the war. The MG 08 also saw service during World War II in the infantry divisions of the German Army, although by the end of the war it had mostly been relegated to second-rate "fortress" units.

Designated after 1908, the year it was adopted by the Imperial German Army, the MG 08 was a development of the license-made MG 01, which was a slight development of the MG 99 The MG 08's rate of fire depends on the lock assembly used and averages 500 rounds per minute for the Schloss 08 and 600 rounds per minute for the Schloss 16. Additional telescopic sights were also developed and used in large quantities during World War I to enable the MG 08 to be used in long-range direct fire and indirect fire support roles.

== Development and adoption ==
The German Rifle Commission began firing tests of the Maxim gun at Zorndorf in 1889. On October 3, 1892, Kaiser Wilhelm II approved a supreme cabinet order allowing the introduction of the "8-mm Maxim machine gun into the naval artillery" for cruisers and landing parties, within the same year, Ludwig Loewe's company signed a seven-year contract with Hiram Maxim for production of the gun in Berlin. The Imperial German Navy ordered Maxim guns from Loewe in 1894. The Navy deployed them on the decks of ships and for use in amphibious warfare. In 1896, Loewe founded a new subsidiary, the Deutsche Waffen- und Munitionsfabriken (DWM), to handle production. The agreement with Maxim concluded in 1898 and DWM received orders from Austria-Hungary, Argentina, Switzerland and Russia. An application for a UK patent on the sled carriage was filed by DWM in 1900.

The Imperial German Army first considered using the Maxim gun as an artillery weapon The German light infantry Jäger troops began trials of the gun in 1898. The Guards Corps, II Corps and XVI Corps made more experiments in 1899. The tests produced a recommendation of independent six-gun detachments to march with the cavalry, with the guns mounted on carriages pulled by horses. Eventually, a modified Maxim was adopted as the MG 99, which was soon followed by the MG 01, both were purchased in limited quantities. By 1903, the German Army had 11 machine-gun detachments serving with cavalry divisions.

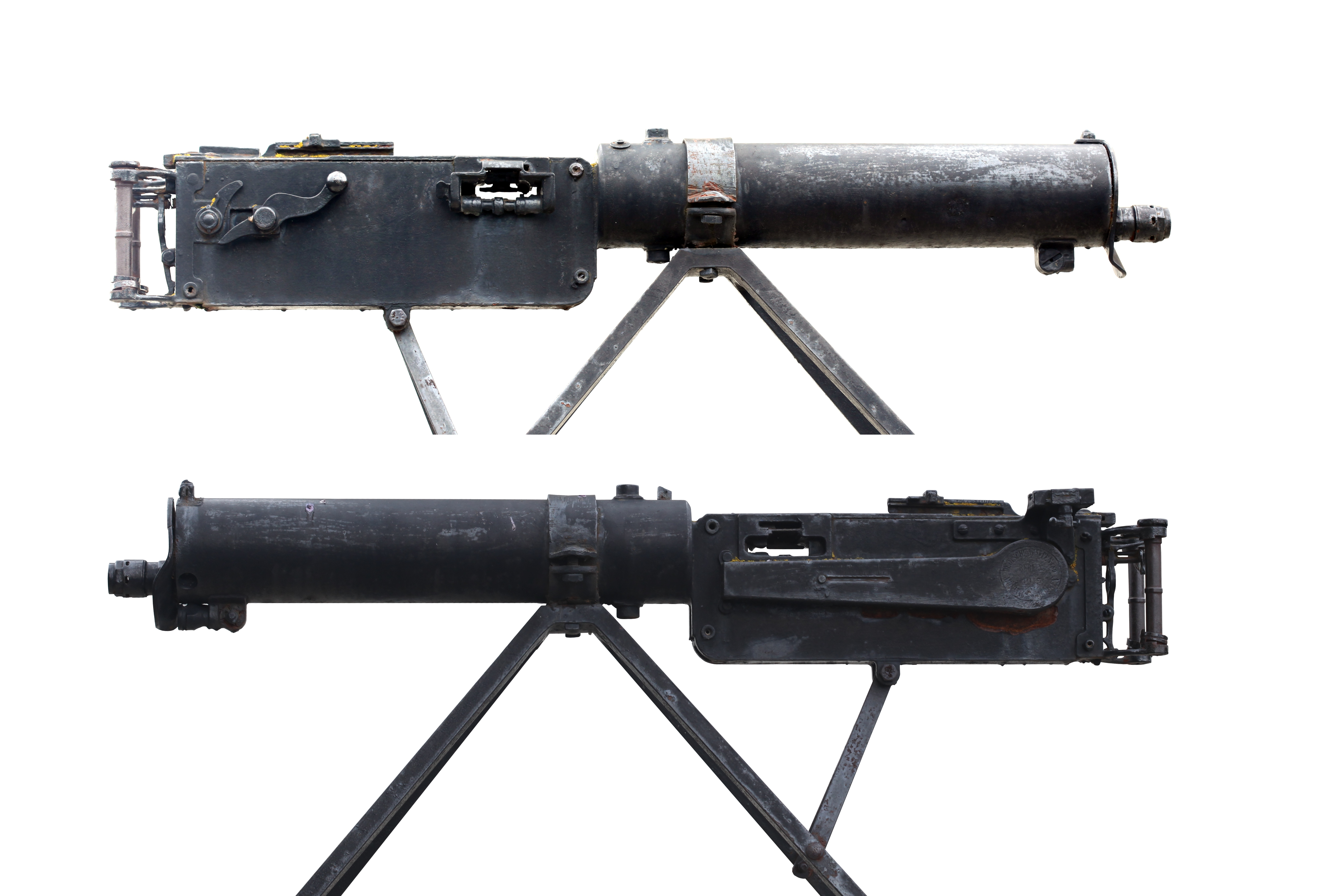
Two side views of the original water-cooled MG 08 infantry version.

Criticisms of the MG 01 stressed its limited mobility and inability to keep up with the cavalry. DWM and Spandau Arsenal developed the design further, decreasing weight by 7.7 kg (17 lb), adding a detachable gun shield, an option for an optical sight, and removing the wheels. The result was the MG 08, which went into production at Spandau in 1908. After the introduction of the MG 08, the MG 01 was mainly used by German colonial soldiers. (Note: During World War I, it was used by the East and South West African Schutztruppe where it was commonly mounted on tripods and artillery carriages.)

== Further development, training and use ==
The German Army observed the effectiveness of the Maxim gun in the Russo-Japanese War of 1904–1905, many of them German exports. With the importance of the machine gun apparent, the Army asked for additional funding from the Reichstag to increase the supply of machine guns. After criticism of the request from Socialist deputies, the Army's demand for six guns per regiment was reduced to six guns per brigade in 1907. Training was regulated by the Field Service Regulations of 1908, providing the German Army six years to train with the guns before the outbreak of World War I. The Army Bill of 1912 finally gave the Army its demanded six guns per regiment. On 3 August 1914, soon after the outbreak of World War I, the Army had 4,411 MG 08s, along with 398 MG 01s, 18 MG 99s and two MG 09s.

At the onset of World War I, Germany developed an aerodynamically refined bullet intended for machine gun use. This 12.8 grams (198 gr) full metal jacket s.S. (schweres Spitzgeschoß, "heavy spitzer bullet") boat tail projectile was loaded in the s.S. Patrone. The s.S. Patrone had an extreme range of approximately 4,700 m (5,140 yd). From its 1914 introduction the s.S. Patrone was mainly issued for aerial combat and as of 1918 in the later stages of World War I to infantry machine gunners.

Another early-WWI improvement introduced in 1915 was a muzzle booster, a patent-protected Vickers invention, which was designated Rückstoßverstärker 08 S. This brought the rate of fire of the MG 08 up to that of the British Vickers machine gun and Russian PM M1910 with their licensed recoil boosters; up from about 300–350 to 450–600 rds/min and improved reliability.

== Design details ==
The gun used 250-round fabric belts of 7.92×57mm ammunition. It was water-cooled, using a jacket around the barrel that held approximately 3.7 litres (0.98 US gal) of water. Using a separate attachment sight with range calculator for indirect fire, the MG 08 could be operated from cover.

The MG 08, like the Maxim gun, operated on the basis of short barrel recoil and a toggle lock. Once cocked and fired the MG 08 would continue firing rounds until the trigger was released or ammunition belt was used up.

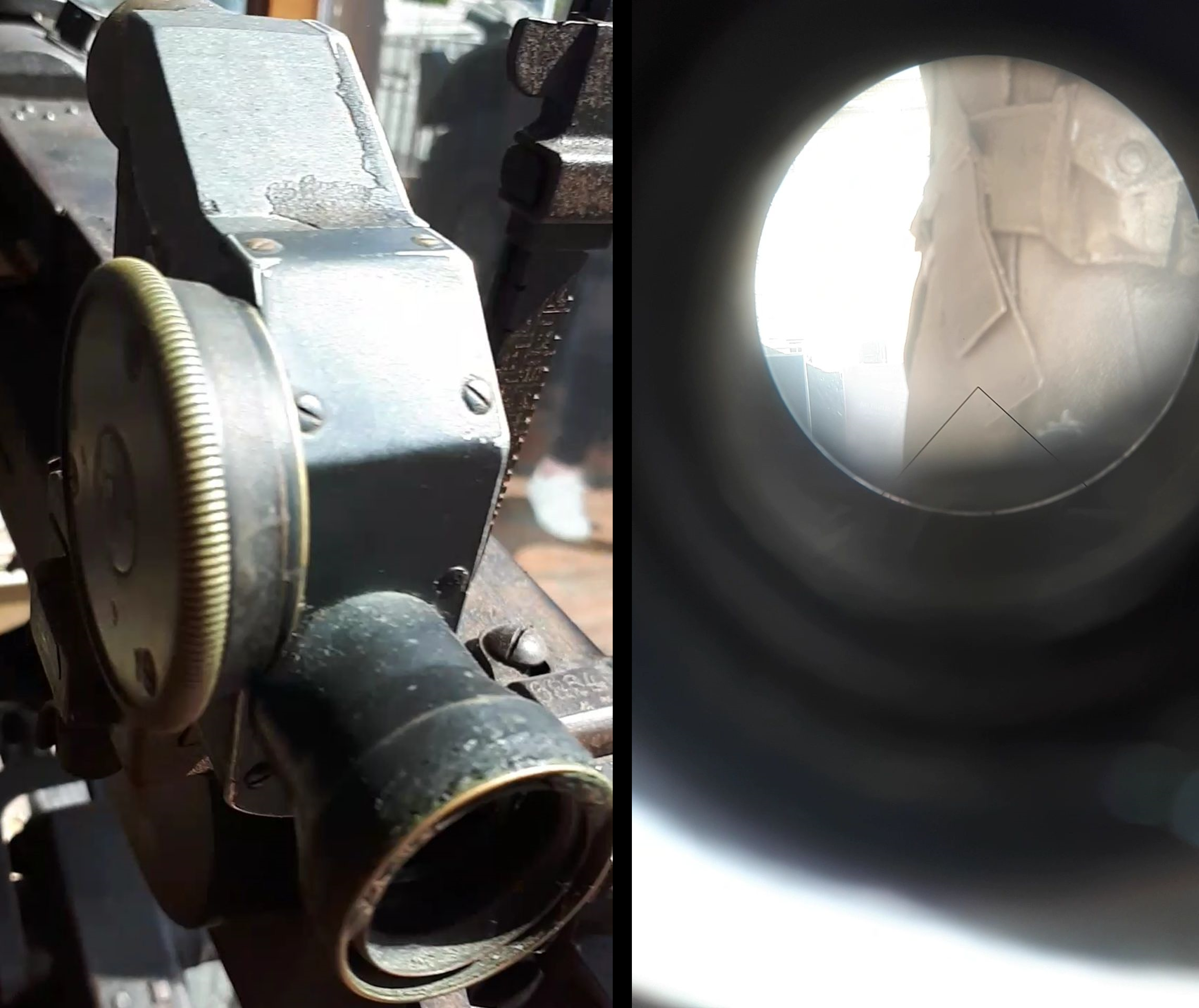
This is a ZF12 sight used on the MG 08, this particular MG 08 (with sight attached) was captured from German troops by soldiers of the 2nd Battalion, The Gloucestershire Regiment while in Macedonia.

The standard iron sightline consisted of a blade front sight and a tangent rear sight with a V-notch, adjustable from 400 to 2,000 metres (437 to 2,187 yd) in 100 metres (109 yd) increments. The Zielfernrohr 12 (ZF12) was an optional 2.5× power optical sight that featured a range setting wheel graduated 400 to 2,000 metres (437 to 2,187 yd) or 400 to 2,600 metres (437 to 2,843 yd) in 100 metres (109 yd) increments. With the addition of clinometers fixed machine gun squads could set ranges of 800 to 3,475 metres (875 to 3,800 yd) and deliver plunging fire or indirect fire at more than 3,000 m (3,280 yd). This indirect firing method exploits the maximal effective range, that is defined by the maximum range of a small-arms projectile while still maintaining the minimum kinetic energy required to put unprotected personnel out of action, which is generally believed to be 15 kilogram-meters (147 J; 108 ft⋅lbf). Its practical range was estimated at some 2,000 metres (2,187 yd) up to an extreme range of 3,500 metres (3,828 yd) when firing the long-range s.S. Patrone.

The MG 08 was mounted on a sled mount (German: Schlittenlafette) that was ferried between locations either on carts or else carried above men's shoulders in the manner of a stretcher.

Pre-war production was by DWM in Berlin and by the government arsenal at Spandau (so the gun was often referred to as the Spandau MG 08). When the war began in August 1914, 4,411 MG 08s were available to battlefield units. Production at numerous factories was markedly ramped up during wartime. In 1914, some 200 MG 08s were produced each month, by 1916—once the weapon had established itself as the pre-eminent defensive battlefield weapon—the number had increased to 3,000; and in 1917 to 14,400 per month.

== MG 08/15 ==
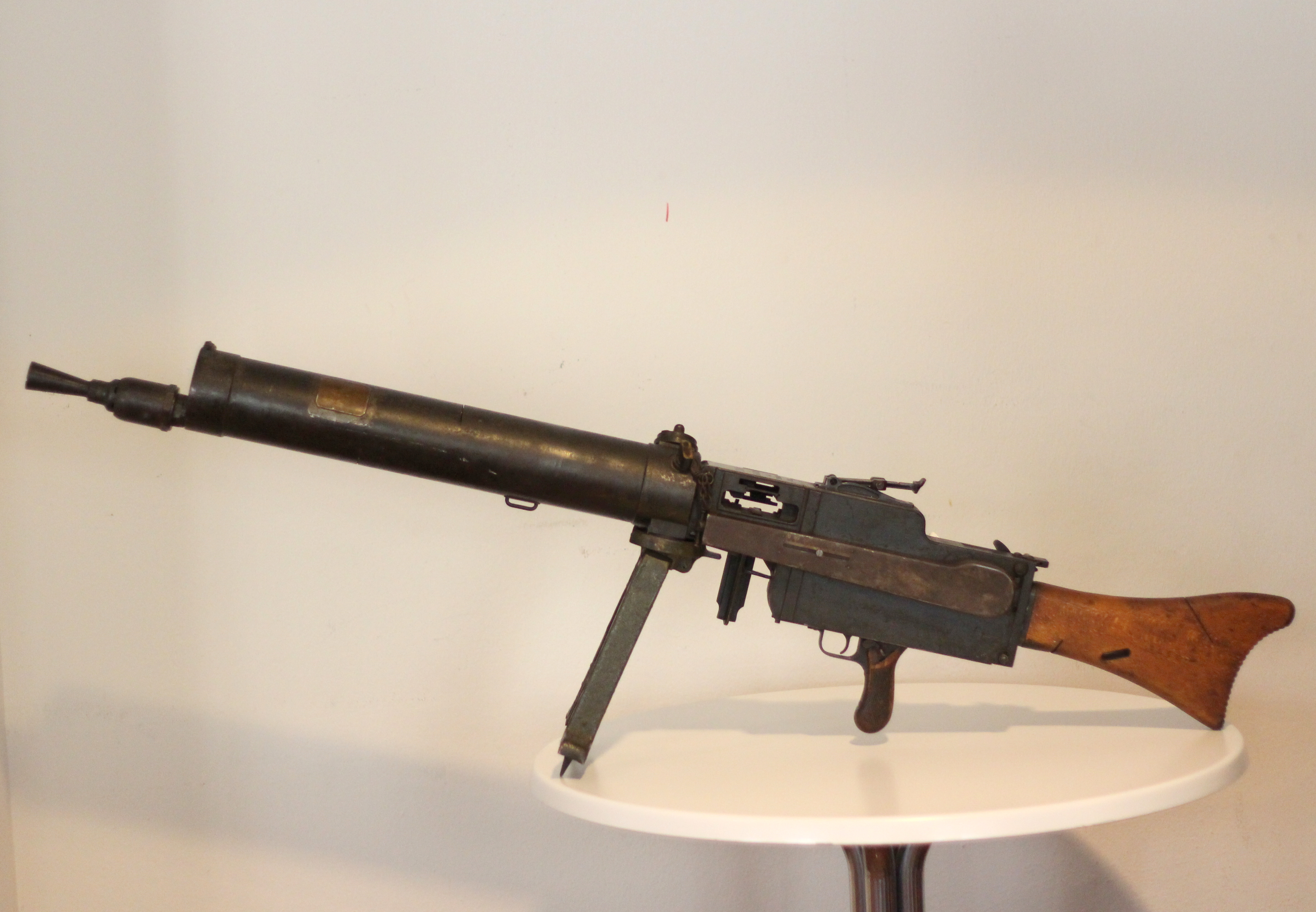
Maschinengewehr 08/15

The MG 08/15 (German: Maschinengewehr 08/15, lit. 'Machine gun 08/15') was the "rather misguided attempt" at a lightened and thus more portable light machine gun from the standard MG 08, produced by "stepping-down" the upper rear and lower forward corners of the original MG 08's rectangular-outline receiver and breech assembly, and reducing the cooling jacket's diameter to 89 mm (3.5 in) from 109 mm (4.29 in). It was tested as a prototype in 1915 by a team of weapon designers under the direction of an Oberst, Friedrich von Merkatz; this became the MG 08/15.

The MG 08/15 had been designed around the concept of portability, such as the French Chauchat light machine gun, which meant that the firepower of a machine gun could be taken forward conveniently by assaulting troops, and moved between positions for tactical fire support; as such, the MG 08/15 was to be manned by two trained infantrymen, a shooter and an ammo bearer. In the attack the weapon would be fired on the move (marching fire) while on the defense the team would make use of the bipod from the prone position. To accomplish that, the MG 08/15 had a short bipod rather than a heavy four-legged sled mount, plus a wooden gunstock and a pistol grip. At 18 kg (40 lb) the MG 08/15 had minimal weight savings over the MG 08, being "a cumbersome beast to use in the assault." Intended to provide increased mobility of infantry automatic fire, it nevertheless remained a bulky water-cooled weapon that was quite demanding on the crews and never on par with its rivals, the Chauchat and the Lewis Gun. Accurate fire was difficult to achieve and usually in short bursts only. The fabric ammunition belts were prone to stretching and there were cartridge extraction problems when they were wet.

It was first introduced in battle during the French Second Battle of the Aisne (Chemin des Dames offensive) in April 1917. Deployment in increasingly large numbers with all front line infantry regiments continued in 1917 and during the German offensives of the spring and summer of 1918.

There were other, less prominent, German machine guns in WWI that showed more promising understanding of tactical firepower; such as the air-cooled 7.92 mm Bergmann MG 15nA which weighed "a more manageable 13kg," had a bipod mount and was fed from a 200-round metal-link belt contained in an assault drum instead of fabric belts. Despite its qualities, it was overshadowed by the production volumes of the MG 08/15 and exiled to secondary fronts, being largely relegated to use in limited numbers on the Italian Front. The Bergmann MG 15nA was also used by the Asien-Korps in Sinai, Mesopotamia and Palestine. Being air-cooled, the Bergmann MG 15nA's barrel would overheat after 250 rounds of sustained fire. Other light machine guns would maintain the water-cooling system, such as the Dreyse MG 10 and MG 15; with an air-cooled version produced just before the war, known as the Dreyse-Muskete or the MG 15.

Despite such developments, the MG 08/15 remained by far the most common German machine gun deployed in World War I, reaching a full allocation of six guns per company (72 guns per regiment) in 1918. By that time, there were four times as many MG 08/15 light machine guns than heavy MG 08 machine guns in each infantry regiment. To attain this goal, about 130,000 MG 08/15 were manufactured during World War I, most of them by the Spandau and Erfurt government arsenals. The heavy weight remained a problem though and a "futile attempt" to solve this problem was a late-war air-cooled version of the MG 08/15, designated as the MG 08/18; but it was only 1 kg lighter than the MG 08/15. The MG 08/18's barrel was heavier and it could not be quickly changed; inevitably overheating was a problem. It was battlefield tested in small numbers during the last months of the war. As noted by McNab, "the Maxim Gun was not a sound basis for an LMG."

=== Idiom ===
The designation 08/15 lives on as an idiom in colloquial German, nullachtfünfzehn (Note: pronounced Null-acht-fünfzehn), being used as a term to denote something totally ordinary and lacking in originality or specialness.

The name of the weapon (null-acht-fünfzehn) originally became a slang term in the German Army in the Second World War. Because of the 08/15's tendency to jam, German soldiers used the name of the gun to refer to any thing that went wrong in their Army experiences.

== Aircraft gun development ==
=== lMG 08 ===
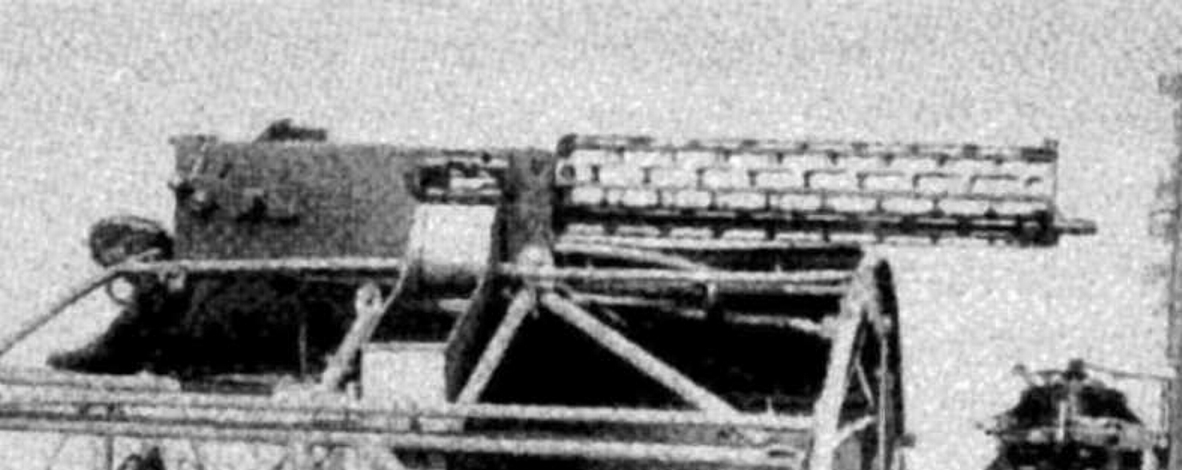
Sideview of the earliest version of the lMG 08 aircraft machine gun, with the overly-slotted 105 mm diameter cooling barrel that made it a physically fragile weapon in front-line use

A lightened air-cooled version of the original water-cooled rectangular pattern-receiver MG 08 infantry automatic ordnance, the lMG 08, was developed by the Spandau arsenal as a rigidly mounted aircraft machine gun and went into production in 1915, in single-gun mounts, for use on the E.I through the E.III production versions of the Fokker Eindecker. The lower case letter "L" prefix meant luftgekühlt ("air-cooled").

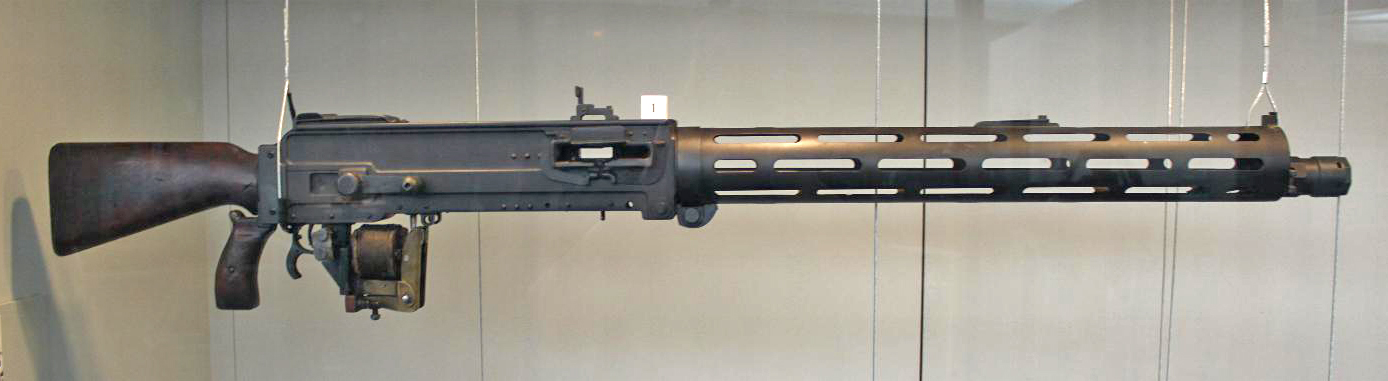
Parabellum MG14

The lMG 08s were later used in pairs by the time of the introduction of the Fokker D.III and Albatros D.I biplane fighters in 1916, as fixed and synchronized cowling guns firing through the propeller. The Parabellum MG 14 built by DWM was a lighter (22 lbs) and quite different, air-cooled Maxim system gun with a very high rate of fire (600-700 rounds/min). It was introduced in 1915, and was, but not without serious problems on occasion (as noted by Otto Parschau), prototyped on Parschau's own A.16/15 Fokker A.III "green machine" monoplane with the Fokker Stangensteuerung gun synchronizer, received back with the synchronized Parabellum by Parschau on May 30, 1915 and first used in quantity as the synchronized forward-firing armament on the five examples of the Fokker M.5K/MG Eindecker production prototype aircraft, and soon afterwards served as a flexible aircraft observer's gun for rear defense.

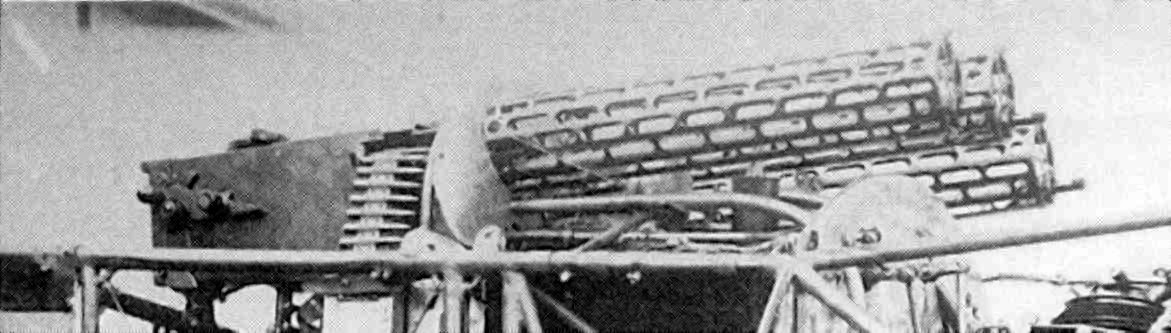
Triple mount of initial production examples of the lMG 08 machine gun in Kurt Wintgens' Fokker E.IV, May 1916 - these guns have the "over-lightened" cooling jackets that caused fragility problems. These use the standard (for aviation) "two hole" ammunition belt

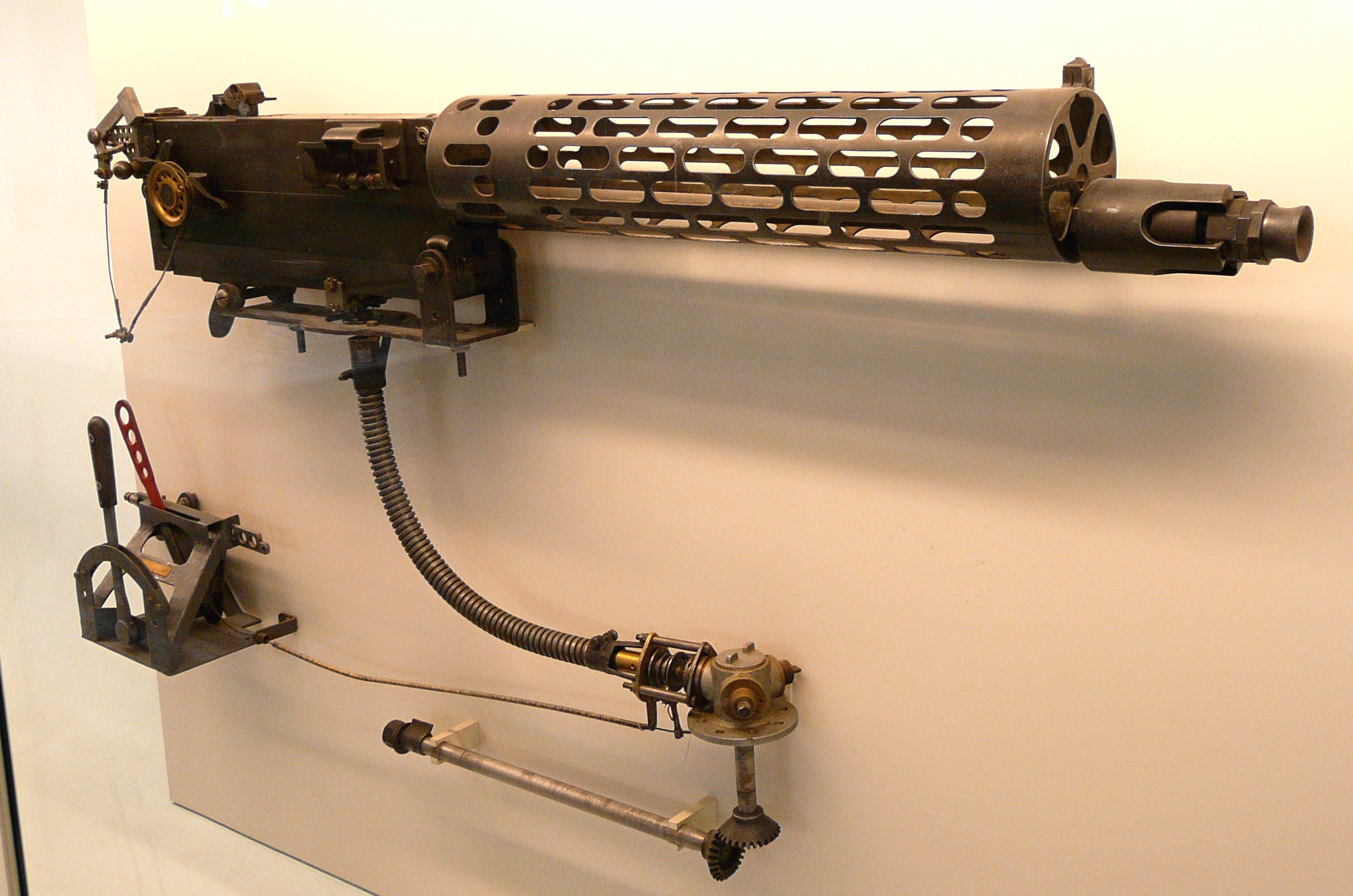
A later production version of the lMG 08 on display, with less slotting than the initial version. There is a synchronization gear and triggering assembly included below the gun.

The initial model of the air-cooled "Spandau" lMG 08 front-firing cowling machine guns had lost the stocks, grips, and bipods of the infantry MG 08s to adapt it to a fixed, forward-firing mount forward of an aircraft's cockpit, with gun synchronization allowing safe firing through a spinning propeller's arc. The 105 mm diameter cylindrical sheet metal water jacket used for the infantry's MG 08, an important support member for the barrel, was initially over-lightened with cooling slots, with fourteen rows of such slots completely surrounding and running the whole length of the jacket's circumferential sheetmetal.

These alternated between seven rows of nine "oblong" slots, alternating with seven more intervening rows of eight slots and twin round holes fore and aft of the slots apiece. Because of the important physical reinforcement provided by the cooling jacket on the MG 08 series of guns, the excessive slotting of the initial model of the air-cooled lMG 08 — amounting to slightly over 50% of the total area of the original cylindrical cooling jacket — rendered the gun too fragile, to the point of making it impossible to fit the muzzle booster that the water-cooled infantry MG 08 guns could be fitted with.

The later models of lMG 08 air-cooled machine gun variously "tweaked" the amount of slotting of the barrel by reducing the amount of sheet metal removed from it in minor ways through at least two or three trial formats, and eventually in the final versions produced, had the slotting omitted at the extreme ends of the cooling jacket's cylindrical member, with a 13 cm wide area of solid sheet metal at the breech end, and a 5 cm wide solid area at the muzzle end, giving the resultant gun much more rigidity. The lMG 08 also retained unchanged the rectangular rear receiver and breech assembly of the water-cooled MG 08 infantry weapon.

=== LMG 08/15 ===
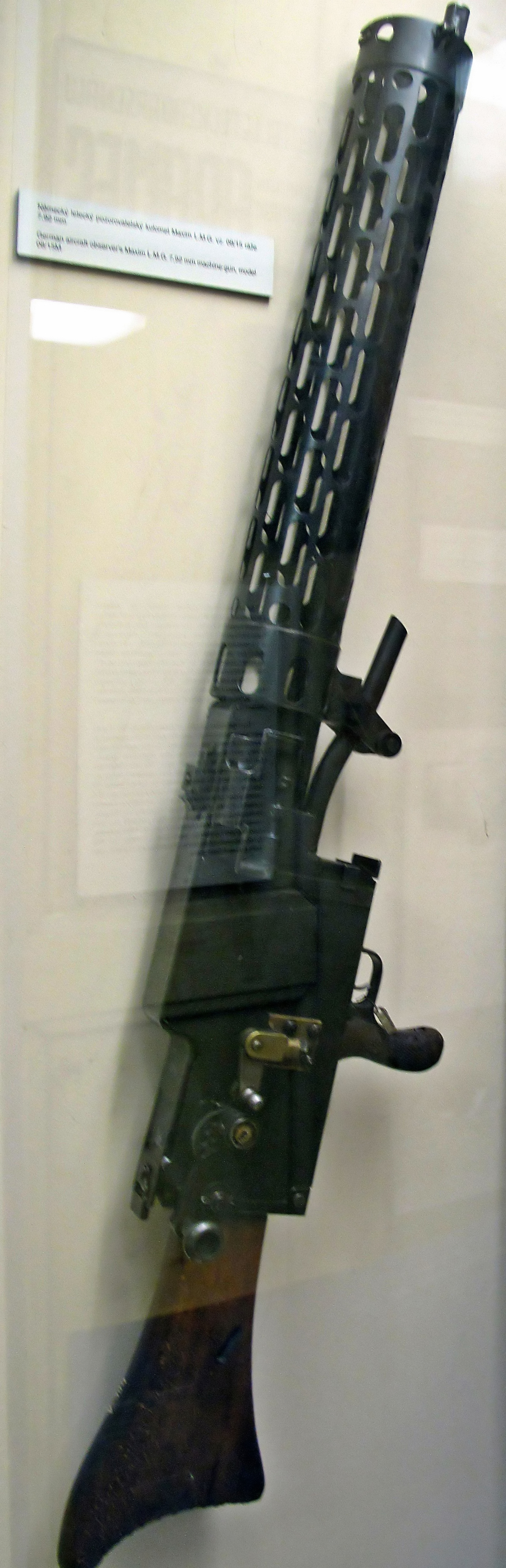
LMG 08/15 air-cooled example, used on 1917-18 German fighters, but without the rifle stock shown

Later, the MG 08's receiver would be lightened by being "stepped down" at its upper-rear and lower-forward corners as the more refined and lighter weight LMG 08/15 version was developed, using the same airframe mounting geometry as the earlier ordnance to allow interchangeability between the earlier lMG 08 and later LMG 08/15 models, with the still well-perforated cooling jacket reduced to a 92.5 mm diameter. Spandau Arsenal began producing the LMG08/15 in May 1916. The LMG 08/15 was introduced in 1917.

The lMG 08 and LMG 08/15 guns were always used on fixed-wing aircraft, as fixed forward-aimed synchronized firing ordnance initially in single mounts for Germany's 1915-16 era Fokker Eindecker and Halberstadt D.II "scout" single-seat fighters, and by 1916 in dual mounts, first appearing on the mass-produced examples of Robert Thelen's Albatros D.I and D.II fighters in late 1916, and singly on German "C-class" armed two-seat observation aircraft for synchronized forward-firing armament. The usual ammunition load for fighters was for longer, 500 round, belts, one for each gun.

A device, occasionally fitted to the rear surface of the later LMG 08/15's receiver backplate, told the pilot how much ammunition was left to fire. Later on a significant upgrade to the gun's aerial usability was the fitting of the Klingstrom device on the right side of the receiver, which allowed the gun to be cocked and loaded with one hand from the cockpit. Various cocking/charging handle styles evolved with a simplified distinctive long handled cocking/charging device finally becoming preferred late in the war.

LMG 08/15's used the 30mm "two hole" ammunition belts of the flexible Parabellum MG14 machine gun rather than the wider "three hole" belts of the MG 08/15 water-cooled infantry weapon. It is possible that these belts were used as they were a bit lighter and less bulky than the wider "three hole" ground gun belts and certainly made for standardization which would have been easier for the armorers and in addition allowed for smaller and lighter "tubes" or "chutes" that guided the empty belts into storage containers in the aircraft after firing.

It is a common misconception that the tubes or chutes coming out of the fixed mounted aviation LMG 08/15 fixed guns were for expended cartridge cases. In actuality these attachments were for guiding the empty cartridge belts into a container inside the fuselage of the aircraft so that the belts would not interfere with the operation of the aircraft. As the entire MG 08 Spandau family of German machine guns ejected their empty cartridge cases forward through a round hole in the receiver's lower forward surface, immediately under the aft end of the barrel's cylindrical cooling-jacket, these cartridge cases were guided out of the aircraft (except on Martin Kreutzer-designed Fokker biplane fighter aircraft, and the Fokker fighters designed by Kreutzer's successor Reinhold Platz) through tubes from under the barrel to the bottom of the fuselage. With Fokker designed aircraft following the Eindecker, the cartridge cases were ejected without tubes from the receiver hole directly into open trays that guided the tumbling cartridge cases backward and sideways onto the sloped fuselage decking, which then streamed down past the cockpit on either side. These trays are clearly visible in photographs but have rarely been recognized for their purpose.

Hermann Göring, who flew both the Fokker Dr.I and Fokker D.VII was so annoyed with the case tumbling out in front of him that he had deflectors made on his aircraft to ensure the empty cartridge cases did not come into his cockpit. On photographs of Göring's aircraft these plates, seen only on his aircraft, are very prevalent but most historians have failed to recognize their purpose. Both empty belt guides and trays were attached directly to the machine guns rather than to the aircraft. In the film showing Australian officers handling the LMG 08/15s from Baron von Richthofen's crashed triplane, the Fokker type belt tubes/chutes and empty cartridge trays can be clearly seen still attached to the guns.

More than 23,000 examples of the LMG 08/15 and an unknown number of the lMG 08 were produced during World War I.

== Chinese derivative ==
Based on the commercial MG 09, in 1935, the Chinese began to produce the Type 24 Heavy Machine Gun, a derivative which was not based solely on German drawings and introduced several improvements and new features.

The Type 24, first introduced to the National Revolutionary Army in 1935, was designed to replace the original MG 08. It was the standard heavy machine gun for all Nationalists, Communists, and Warlords from 1935. They were usually made in the Hanyang Arsenal. Like the original MG 08, because of transportation difficulties, the M1917 Browning machine gun and other machine guns slowly replaced the Type 24 for the NRA after the Chinese Civil War. The PM M1910, and the SG-43 Goryunov (or Type 53/57 Machine gun) slowly replaced the Type 24 Heavy machine gun after the Chinese Civil War, but it was kept in service with the PLA, KPA and the NVA until the 1960s during the Vietnam War.

The Type 24 heavy machine gun's tripod resembles the tripod of the MG 08. This gun is not able to be mounted on sledge mounts. When aiming at enemy infantry, it usually comes with a muzzle disk. When used as an anti-aircraft gun, it uses a metal pole to make the tripod higher and usually does not come with a muzzle disk. The gun's receiver is similar to the MG 08's gun body. Like the original MG 08, it needs a crew of four. The Type 24 heavy machine gun is chambered with the 7.92×57mm Mauser round, the standard Chinese military rifle cartridge of Nationalist China. After the Chinese Civil War, People's Republic of China militia and reserve units converted a number of Type 24 HMG into the 7.62×54mmR Russian cartridge. They were used for training or as filming prop, and never entered service.

== Variants ==
Ground variants

- MG 08 −
- MG 08/15 −
- MG 08/18 (German: Maschinengewehr 08/18) − An air-cooled variant developed at the very end of World War I as a lighter alternative to the MG 08/15 (being ~2.7 kg (6 lb) lighter). Only a few hundred appeared to have been produced. The MG 08/18 barrel jacket served as the basis for the MG 34 barrel shroud.
- MG 09 (German: Maschinengewehr 09, lit. 'Machine gun 09') − Commercial pattern of the MG 08 made by DWM, featuring the naval tripod mount of the MG 08 instead of the sled mount. Exported to Romania and Switzerland.
- MG 16 (German: Maschinengewehr 16, lit. 'Machine gun 16') − An experimental version of the MG 08, which was to be a universal machine gun for the Deutsches Heer. The MG 16 could use the bipod of the MG 08/15 or a modified tripod for the MG 08. (Note: The tripod was later issued as the Dreifuss 16, which required an adapter for mounting the MG 08.) Due to Germany's limited manufacturing capacity, mass production was not proceeded.

Other variants

- lMG 08 (German: luftgekühlt Maschinengewehr 08, lit. 'air-cooled machine gun 08') − Aircraft machine gun
- LMG 08/15 − Aircraft machine gun
- MG 18 TuF (German: Maschinengewehr 18 Tank und Flieger, lit. 'Machine gun 18 tank and aircraft') − A heavy machine gun version designed in 1917, chambered in the same 13.2×92mmSR round as the 13.2 mm (0.52 in) Mauser Tankgewehr M1918 anti-tank rifle. It was introduced in 1918, issued in very limited numbers in the near end of World War I and saw no service.

Foreign derivatives

- MG 11 −
- Type 24 − A Chinese variant based on the commercial MG 09 with some improvements.

== Manufacturers ==
Main manufacturers
Deutsche Waffen und Munitionsfabriken (1896–1918)
Spandau Gewehrfabrik (1908–1918)
Erfurt Arsenal (1908–1918)
Maschinenfabrik Augsburg Nürnberg (1918) (Note: Main manufacturer of the MG 18 TuF.)
Other manufacturers
Waffenfabrik Bern (1911–1946)
Hanyang Arsenal (1935–1950)

== Users ==
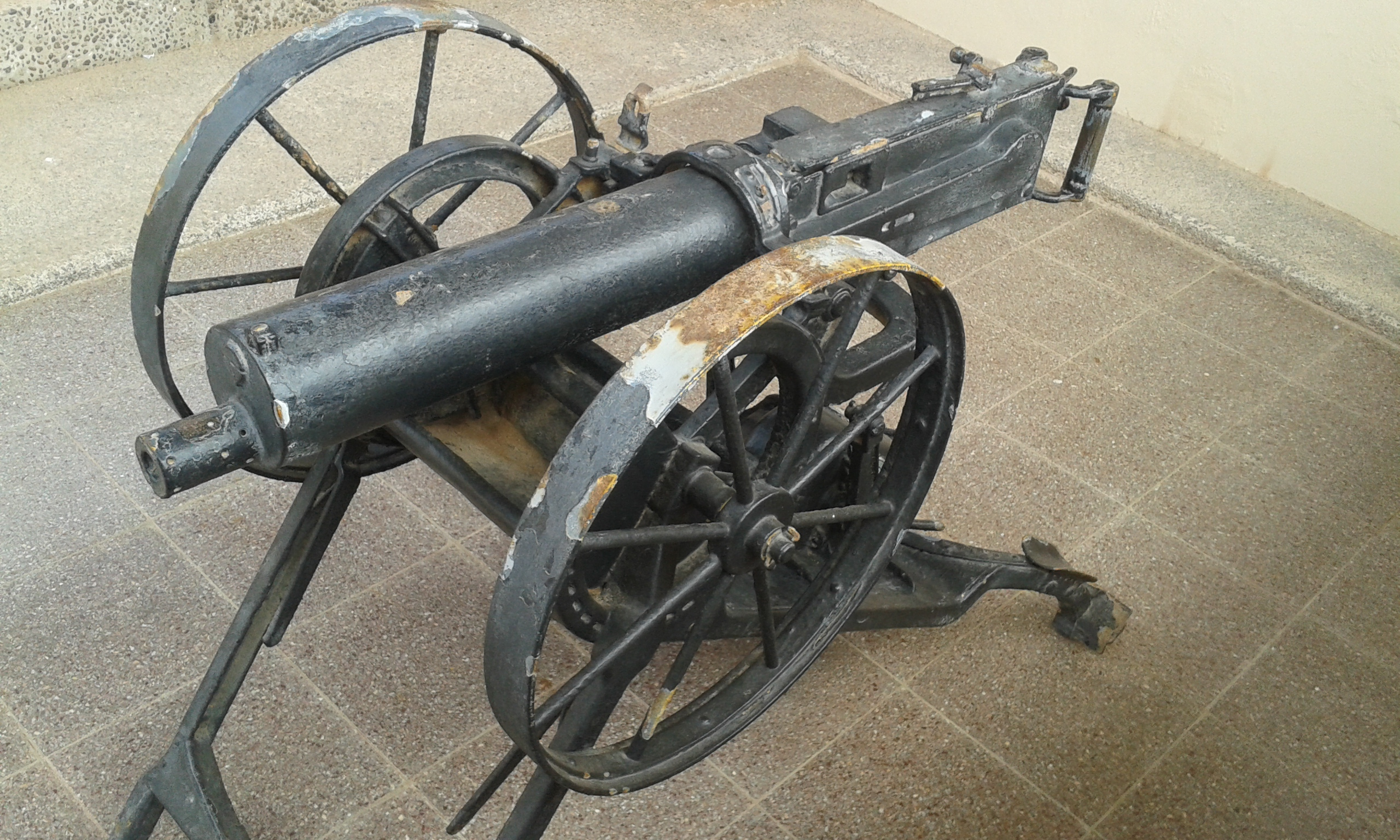
Chilean M1902 Maxim was essentially identical to MG 01 except for the caliber

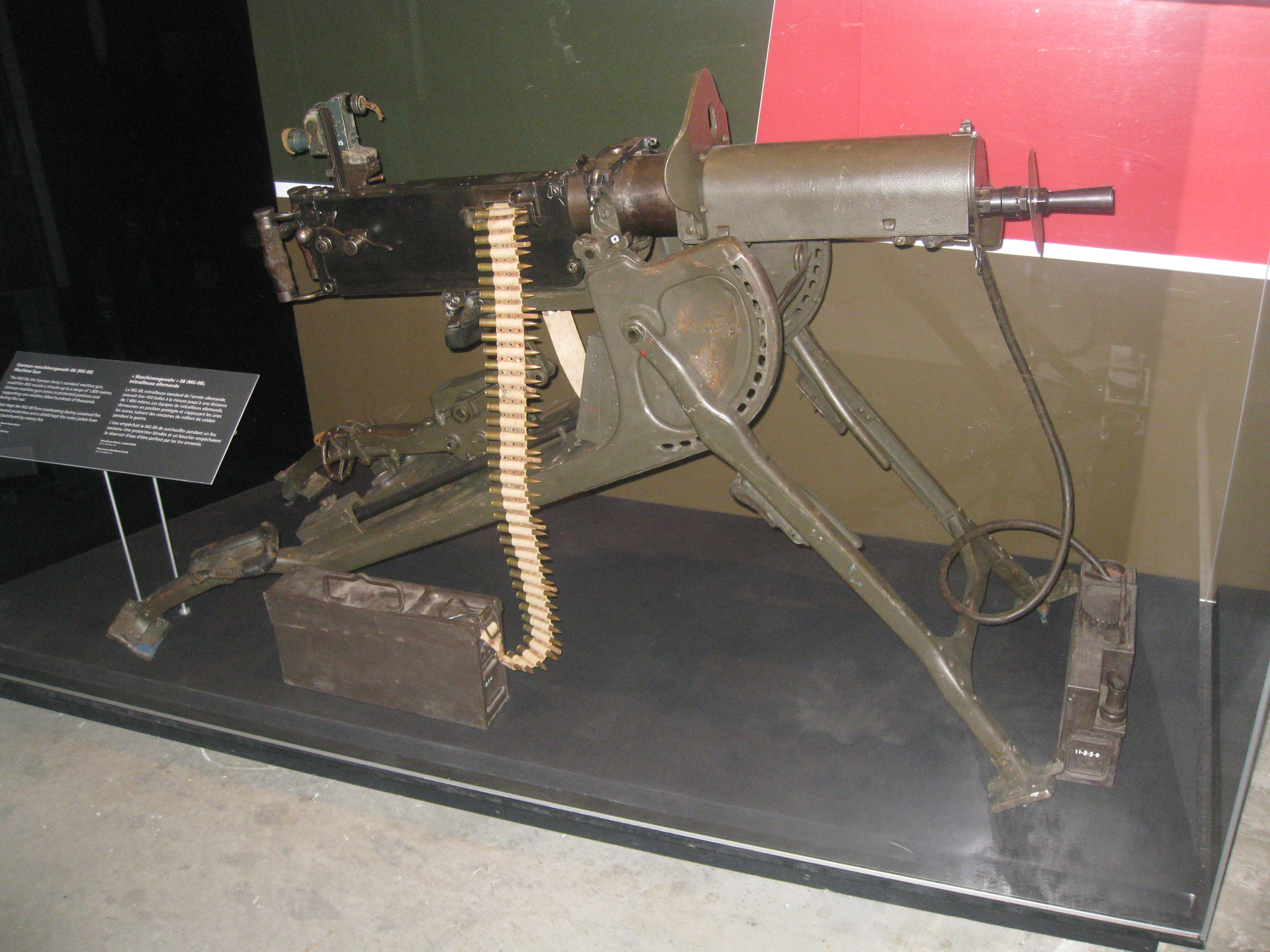
An MG 08 at the Canadian War Museum

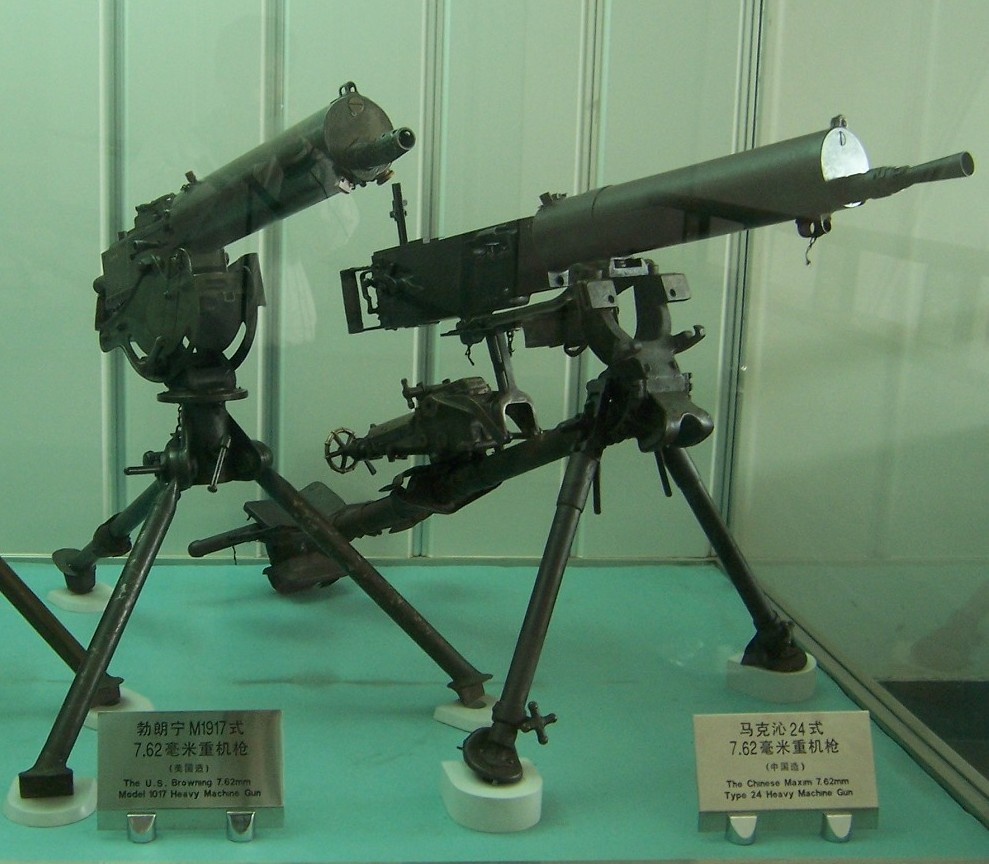
A Browning M1917 and Type 24 Heavy Machine Gun

- Austria-Hungary
- Argentina
- Belgium
- Brazil
- Bulgaria — At least two MG 01s were delivered and used during the Balkan Wars. MG 08s were supplied before the Balkan Wars and during World War I. After World War I, some were retained, both officially and as hidden supplies.
- Chile — Despite the cheaper Hotchkiss machine gun already in service, the MG 01 was adopted as the ametralladora Maxim modello 1902 (in 7mm Mauser) on the orders of Emil Körner who was affiliated with DWM.
- China — Made under license as the Type 24 heavy machine gun. Imported MG 08/15 machine guns also used during Second Sino-Japanese War.
- China (PRC) — Used Type 24 guns (converted to 7.62×54mmR).
- Czechoslovakia — The MG 08/15 was in use after independence
- Finland — The MG 08 (designated 7.92 KK 08) used as late as the Continuation War (mostly with coastal troop). The MG 08/15 and MG 08/18 (designated 7.92 PK 08-15 and 7.92 PK 08-18 respectively) were used until 1931, when they were sold off.
- France — MG 08 and 08/15 versions were captured and used by French forces in WW1 and afterwards.
- German Empire — Used by the Kaiserliche Marine and Deutsches Heer between 1901 and 1919. By the start of World War I, almost all of the MG 01s and other machine guns considered obsolete had been relegated to machine gun detachments in Germany's colonial possessions where they had started to be replaced by the MG 08s.
- Germany (Weimar Republic)
- Germany
- Indonesia — Used Chinese Type 24.
- Latvia — At least 11 light-weight MG 08s used by the Latvian Army (by April 1936)
- Lithuania — About 800 MG 08 (7,92 mm sunkusis kulkosvaidis 08 m.) and 520 MG 08/15 (7,92 mm lengvasis kulkosvaidis 08/15 m.). Some MG 08 were modernized for anti-aircraft defense.
- Netherlands — Ex-German MG 08s confiscated at the end of WWI entered Dutch service in 1925 in the light anti-aircraft role, with the designation Spandau M.25.

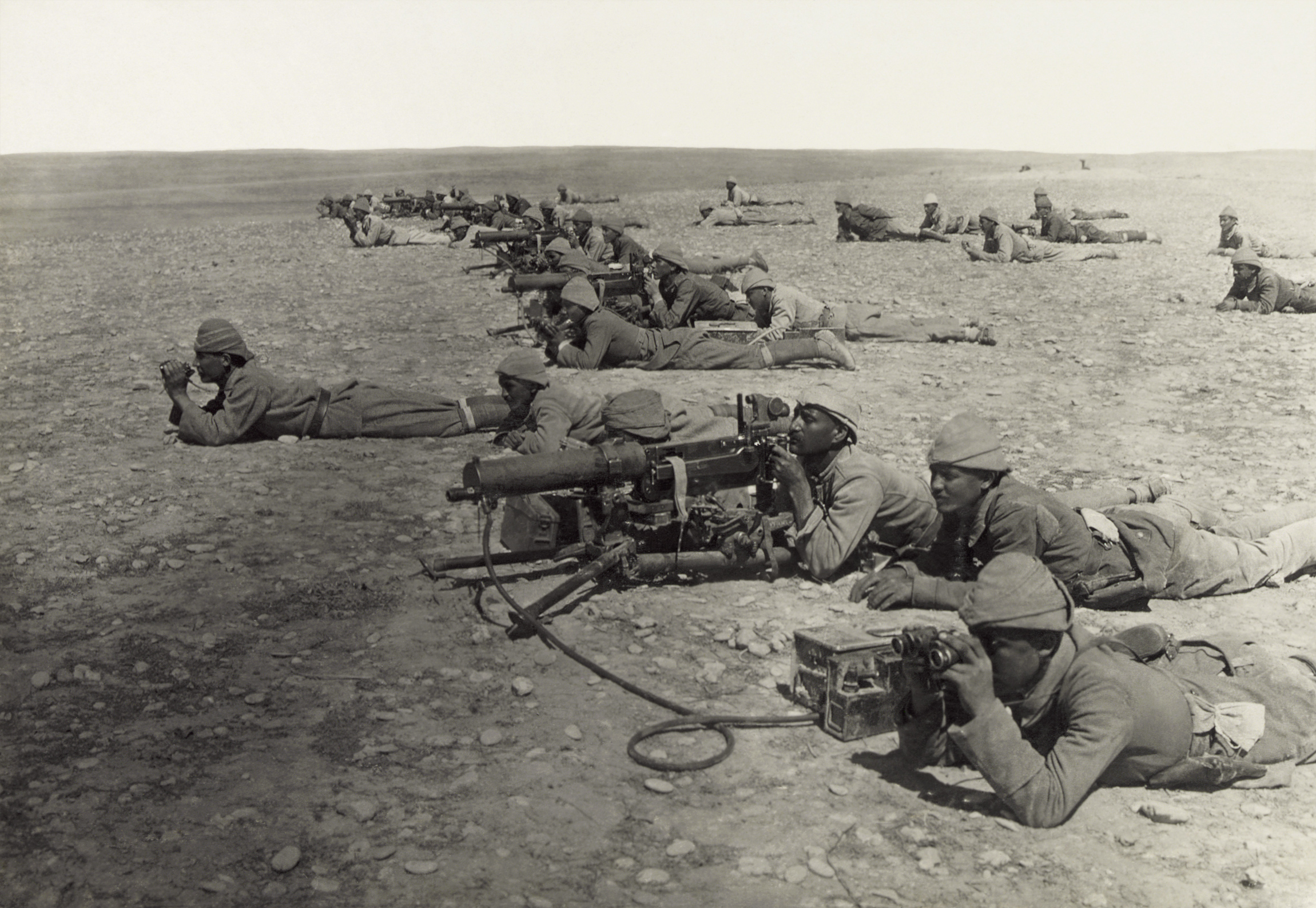
Ottoman soldiers and tripod mount MG 08s. (Note: The MG 08s are mounted on tripods instead of sledge mounts that were common to the MG 08.)

- Ottoman Empire
- Poland — Between 1918 and 1944, up to 5,964 MG 08 (ckm wz.08) and 7,775 MG 08/15 (lkm wz.08/15) were used.
- Malaysia — Used Chinese-made Type 24.
- Manchukuo — Used Chinese-made Type 24s
- Romania — Commercial MG 09s marked as Model 1910.
- Russian Empire
- Switzerland
- Spanish Republic
- United Kingdom — At least 1 MG 01 captured from the Germans and put into service during World War I.
- Vietnam — The Viet Minh used Chinese Type 24 during the First Indochina War, as did the Viet Cong during the Vietnam War.
- Yugoslav Partisans

== Conflicts ==
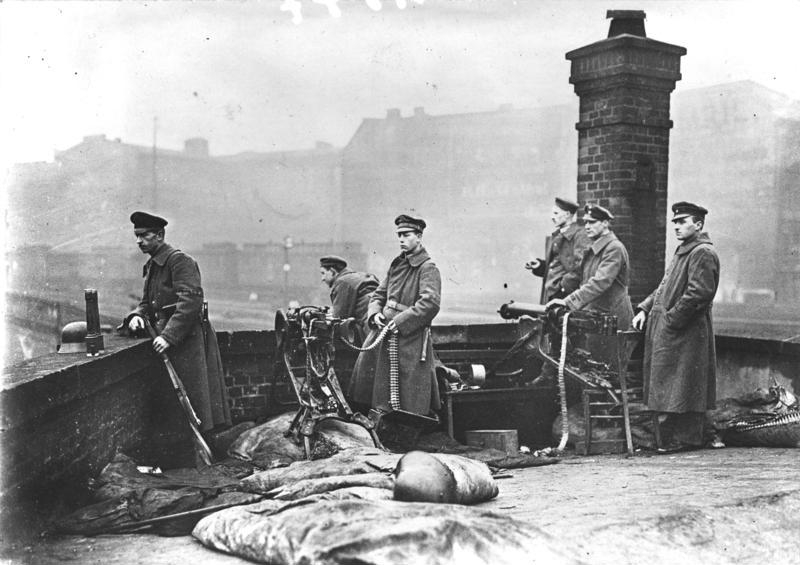
German soldiers during the 1919 Spartacist uprising occupying the Silesian train station in Berlin with an MG 01 and MG 08.

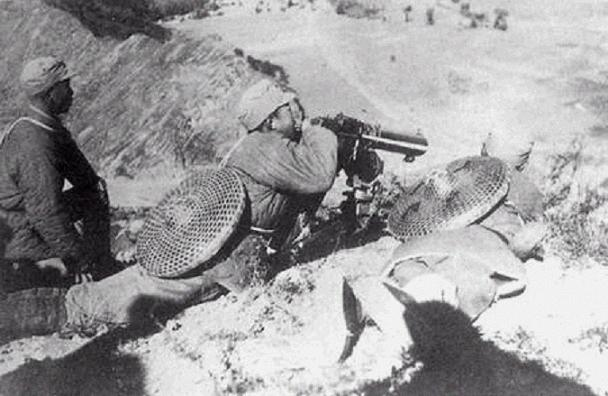
Chinese soldiers of the Eighth Route Army firing a Type 24 in an ambush of Japanese troops in the Battle of Pingxingguan

1900 – early 1920s
Herero Wars (1904–1908) (Note: Wars that included the use of the MG 01.)
Mexican Revolution (1910–1920)
Xinhai Revolution (1911–1912)
Balkan Wars (1912–1913)
- World War I (1914–1918)
  - Siege of Tsingtao (1914) (Note: In the Kiautschou Bay Leased Territory, it was used by the machine gun company of the III. Seebataillon.)
- Aftermath of World War I (1917–1923) (Note: Including the revolutions of 1917–1923.)
  - Russian Civil War (1917–1922)
  - German Revolution (1918–1919)
    - January uprising (1919)
  - Finnish Civil War
  - Greater Poland Uprising
  - Silesian Uprisings
  - Polish–Soviet War (1919–1921)
Late 1920s onward
- Chinese Civil War
  - 1^{st} Phase (1927–1936)
  - 2^{nd} Phase (1945–1949)
Spanish Civil War (1936–1939)
2^{nd} Sino-Japanese War (1937–1945)
World War II (1939–1945)
Indonesian War of Independence (1945–1949)
- Indochina Wars
  - 1^{st} Indochina War (1946–1954)
  - 2^{nd} Indochina War (1955–1975)
Korean War (1950–1953)

== See also ==
- List of 7.92×57mm Mauser firearms

Weapons of comparable role, performance and era

- Bergmann MG 15nA machine gun – (German Empire)
- M1917 Browning machine gun – (United States)
- Kjellman machine gun – (Sweden)
- Marlin M1917 & M1918 machine guns – (United States)
- PM M1910 – (Russian Empire, Soviet Union)
- Schwarzlose MG M.07/12 – (Austria–Hungary)
- Vickers machine gun – (United Kingdom of Great Britain and Ireland)
