= Heavy machine gun =

Gun capable of heavy sustained fire

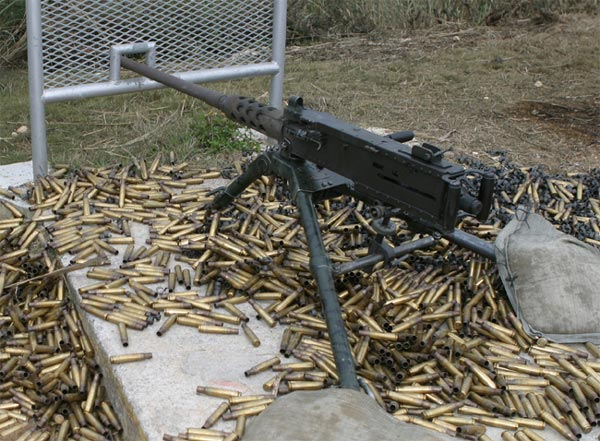
The M2 Browning machine gun with a tripod weighs 58 kg (128 lb).

A heavy machine gun (HMG) is significantly larger than light, medium or general-purpose machine guns. HMGs are typically too heavy to be man-portable (carried by one person) and require mounting onto a weapons platform to be operably stable or tactically mobile, have more formidable firepower, and generally require a team of personnel for operation and maintenance.

There are two classes of weapons generally defined as HMGs:

- The historical definition refers to machine guns, typically chambered in standard full-power cartridges, that are identified as being "heavy" due to their weight and cumbersomeness, which prevents infantrymen from transporting them on foot. Examples include the Maxim machine gun and M1917 Browning machine gun.
- The modern definition refers to "heavy caliber" machine guns, pioneered by the German Empire's MG 18 TuF which was a Maxim derivative chambered in 13.2×92mmSR fielded near the end of World War I. They are designed to provide increased effective range, penetration and stopping power against vehicles, aircraft and light fortifications beyond the full-power cartridges used in battle rifles and medium or general-purpose machine guns, and far beyond the intermediate cartridges used in assault rifles, light machine guns and squad automatic weapons. HMGs also have more felt recoil than their lighter counterparts. Popular HMG rounds today are the 12.7×99mm, 12.7×108mm and 14.5×114mm cartridges.

== Classification ==
The term originally referred to the generation of machine guns which came to prominence in the lead up to and during World War I. These fired standard full-power rifle cartridges such as the 7.92×57mm Mauser, 7.7×56mmR (.303 British) or 7.62×54mmR, but featured heavy construction, elaborate mountings and water-cooling mechanisms that enabled long-range sustained automatic fire with excellent accuracy. However, these advantages came at the cost of being too cumbersome to move and required a crew of several soldiers to operate them. Thus, in this sense, the "heavy" aspect of the weapon referred to the weapon's bulk and ability to sustain fire, not the cartridge caliber. This class of weapons was best exemplified by the Maxim gun, invented by the American inventor Hiram Maxim. The Maxim was the most ubiquitous machine gun of World War I, variants of which were fielded in large simultaneously by three separate warring nations—Germany with the MG 08, Britain with the Vickers, and Russia with the PM M1910).

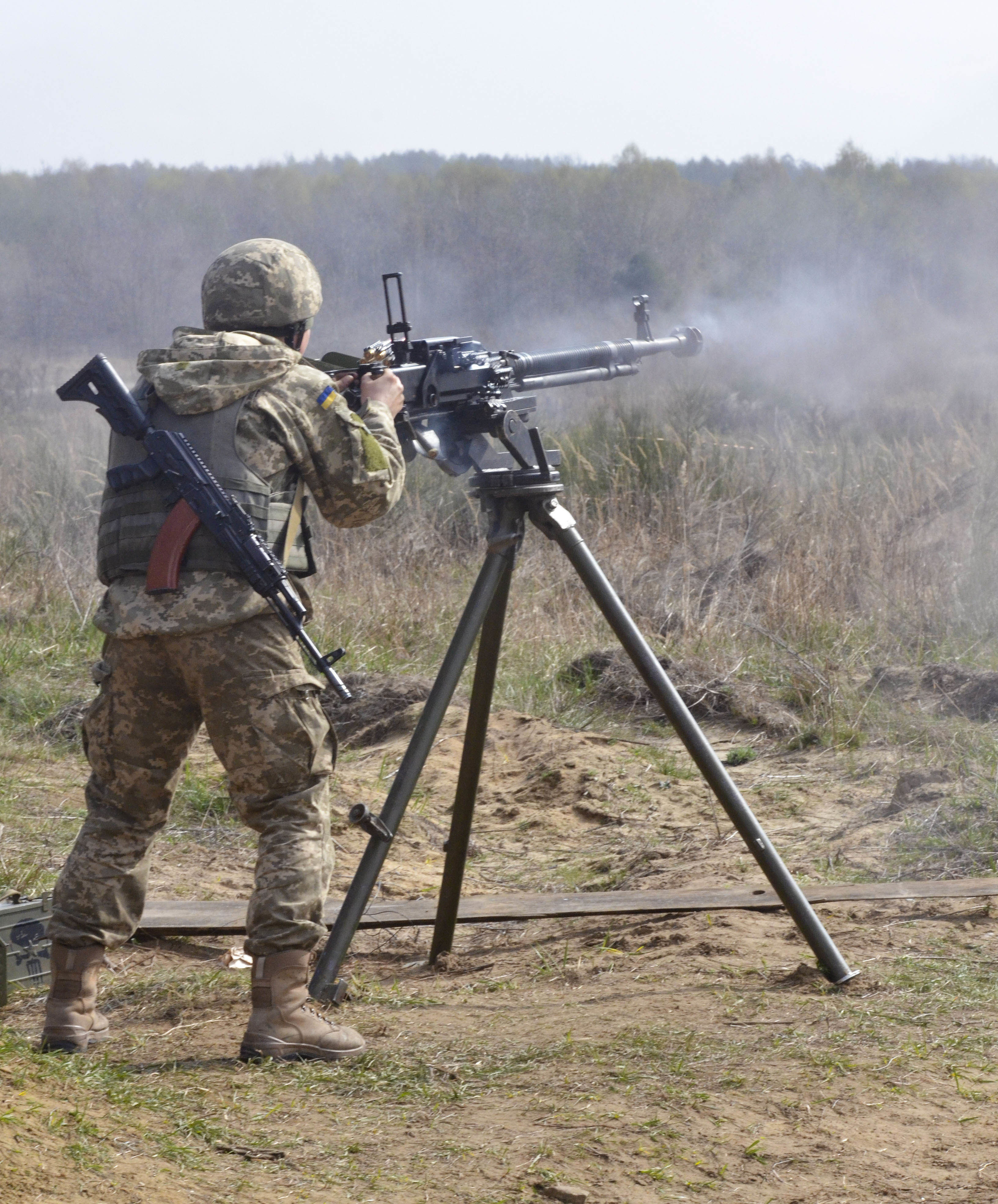
A Ukrainian Ground Forces soldier firing the DShKM in heavy role.

The modern definition refers to a class of machine guns chambered in "heavy caliber" ammunition, generally with a minimum bullet diameter of 12mm, a minimum cartridge case length of 80mm and a minimum bullet weight of 500 grain, but below a bullet diameter of 20mm which are considered "medium caliber" ammunition for autocannons. Pioneered by the German Empire's 13.2×92mmSR caliber MG 18 TuF (Maschinengewehr 18 Tank und Flieger, 'Machinegun 18 Tank and Aircraft') during World War I, these weapons are designed to provide increased range, penetration and destructive power against vehicles, buildings, aircraft and light fortifications beyond the standard rifle calibers used in medium or general-purpose machine gun, or the intermediate cartridges used in light machine guns. In this sense, the "heavy" aspect of the weapon refers to its superior power and range over light and medium caliber weapons, in addition to its weight. This class of machine gun came into widespread use during World War II, when the M2 was used widely in fortifications, on vehicles and in aircraft by American forces. A similar HMG capacity was later fielded by the Soviets in the form of Vasily Degtyaryov's DShK in 12.7×108mm. The ubiquitous German MG42 general-purpose machine gun, though well-suited against infantry, lacked the M2's anti-fortification and anti-vehicle capability, a fact that was noted and lamented by the Germans. The continued need for a longer-range machine gun with anti-materiel capability to bridge the gap between exclusively anti-infantry weapons and exclusively anti-materiel weapons has led to the widespread adoption and modernization of the class, and most nations' armed forces are equipped with some type of HMG.

Currently, machine guns with calibers from .22 to .250 caliber (i.e., 5.45 mm to 6 mm) are considered light machine guns; medium machine guns have .264 to .33 caliber (i.e., 6.5 mm to 8 mm); and .50 caliber or larger (i.e., 12.7 mm to 21 mm) for heavy machine guns.

Autocannons, or "cannons" are defined by any gun firing a cartridge above .80 caliber (i.e., 20 mm), but does not apply to 40mm grenade launchers. Anything else under .80 caliber is considered a machine gun.

== History ==
In the late 19th century, Gatling guns and other externally powered types such as the Nordenfelt gun and Gardner gun were often made in a variety of calibers, such as 0.5-inch and 1-inch. Due to their multiple barrels, overheating was not so much of an issue, but they were also quite heavy. When Maxim developed his recoil-powered Maxim gun using a single barrel, his first main design weighed a modest 26 pounds (11.8 kg) and fired a .45-inch rifle-caliber bullet from a 24-inch barrel. A famous photo of Maxim showed him picking it up by its 15-pound tripod (6.8 kg) with one arm. It was similar to present-day medium machine guns, but it could not be fired for extended periods due to overheating. As a result, Maxim created a water jacket cooling system to enable it to fire for extended periods. However, this added significant weight, as did the change to more powerful rifle cartridges.

There were thus two main types of heavy, rapid-fire weapons: the manually powered, multiple-barrel machine guns and the single-barrel Maxim guns. By the end of the 19th century, many new designs such as the M1895 Colt–Browning and Hotchkiss M1897 were developed, powered by gas operation or recoil operation. Also, rather than the heavy water jacket, new designs introduced other types of barrel cooling, such as barrel replacement, metal fins, heat sinks or some combination of these.

== Designs ==
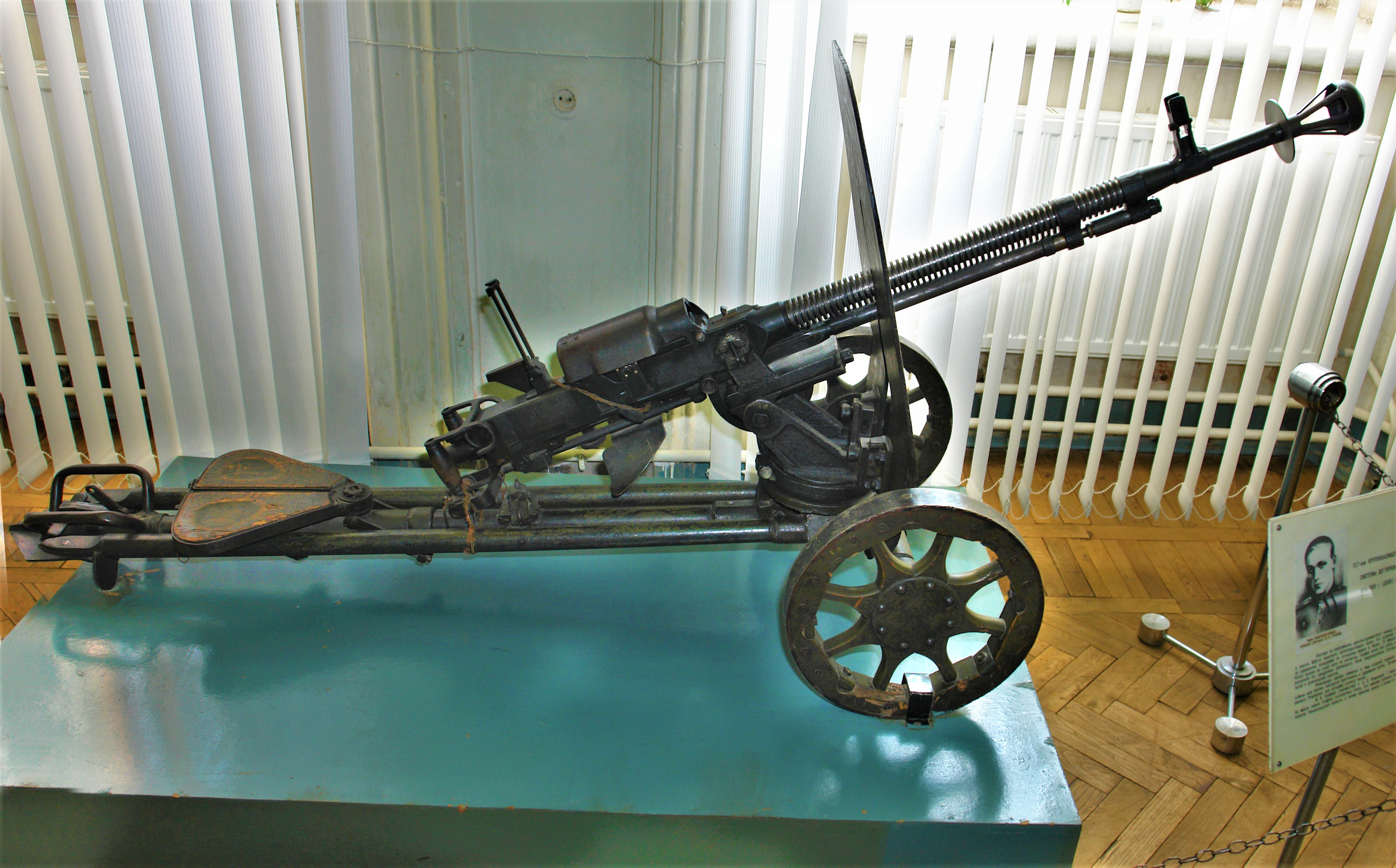
Wheel mounted DShK.

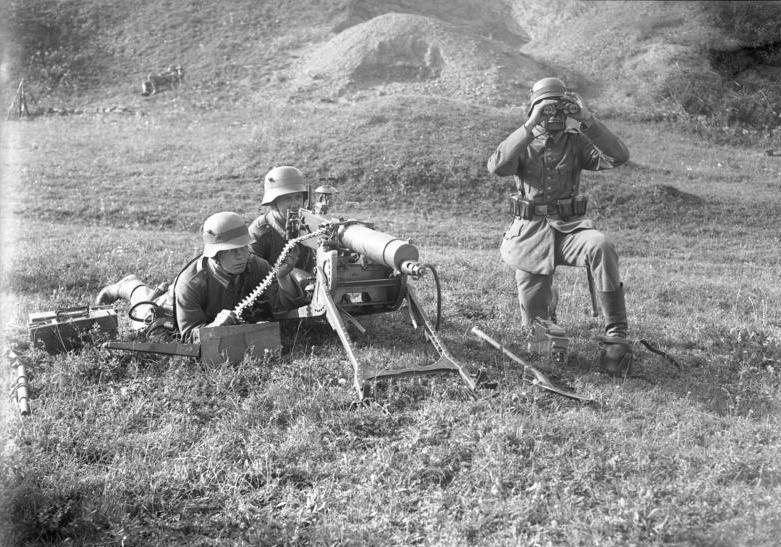
MG 08 system (7.92 mm) and crew circa 1931.

Machine guns diverged into heavier and lighter designs. The later model water-cooled Maxim guns and its derivatives the MG 08 and the Vickers, as well as the American M1917 Browning machine gun, were all substantial weapons. The .303 Vickers, for example, weighed 33 lb (15 kg) and was mounted on a tripod that brought the total weight to 50 lb (23 kg). The heavier designs could, and in some cases did, fire for days on end, mainly in fixed defensive positions to repel infantry attacks. These machine guns were typically mounted on tripods and were water-cooled, and a well-trained crew could fire nonstop for hours, given sufficient ammunition, replacement barrels and cooling water. Carefully positioned HMGs could stop an attacking force before they reached their objectives.

=== Light machine guns ===
However, during the same period a number of lighter and more portable air-cooled designs were developed weighing less than 30 lbs (15 kg). In World War I they were to be as important as the heavier designs, and were used to support infantry on the attack, on aircraft, and on many types of vehicles.

The lightest of the new designs were not capable of sustained automatic fire, as they did not have water jackets and were fed from comparatively small magazines. Essentially machine rifles with a bipod, weapons like the Lewis Gun, Chauchat and the Madsen were portable by one soldier, but were made for single and burst fire.

=== Medium models ===
The medium designs offered greater flexibility, either being fitted with a bipod in the light machine gun role or on a tripod or other weapon mount as medium machine guns. An example was the Hotchkiss M1909 machine gun weighing 27.6 lb (12.2 kg) fitted with a mini-tripod and using linkable 30-round ammunition strips, but there was also a belt-fed version.

This type of multipurpose machine gun would be further developed, and later given names such as "universal machine gun", and later "general-purpose machine gun", and would eventually supplant the water-cooled designs. These later designs used quick-change barrel replacement to reduce overheating, which further reduced the weapon's weight, but at the cost of increasing the soldier's load due to the extra barrels. Some earlier designs like the Vickers had this feature, but it was mainly for barrel wear, as they normally used water cooling. It was in the 1920s and 1930s that quick barrel replacement for cooling purposes became more popular in weapons such as the ZB vz. 30, the Bren, the MG34 and the MG42.

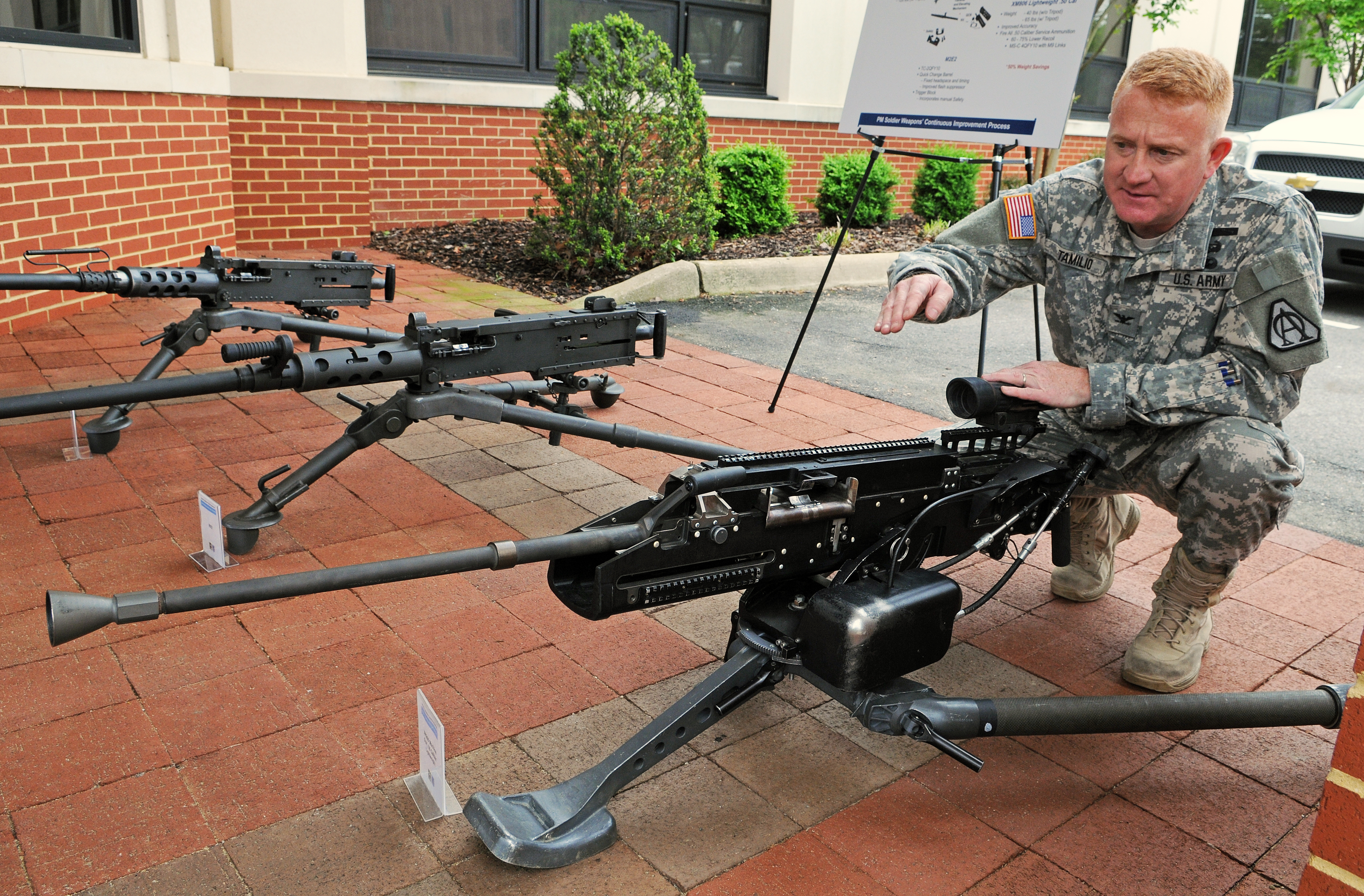
US .50 caliber HMG developments – Browning M2, Browning M2E2 Quick Change Barrel, XM806 Lightweight .50 Caliber Machine Gun (LW50)

== World War II and later ==
The heavier designs continued to be used throughout World War II and into the 1960s, but were gradually phased out in favor of air-cooled designs. The mediums were now used both as medium machine guns while mounted on tripods and as light machine guns while mounted on bipods. This was possible in part because a heavy, static MG position was not a very effective tactic in vehicle-centered warfare, and the significantly lighter air-cooled designs could nearly match the capabilities of the water-cooled versions.

Gatling-type machine guns such as the Minigun and GShG-7.62 reappeared after World War II. These are typically mounted on ships and helicopters because of their weight and large ammunition requirements due to their extremely high rate of fire. The need for sustained automatic fire on the ground, however, is now nearly entirely filled by air-cooled medium machine guns.

== See also ==
- Autocannon
- Medium machine gun
- Squad automatic weapon
- List of firearms
- List of machine guns
- List of multiple barrel machine guns
