= MG 18 TuF =

Maschinengewehr 18
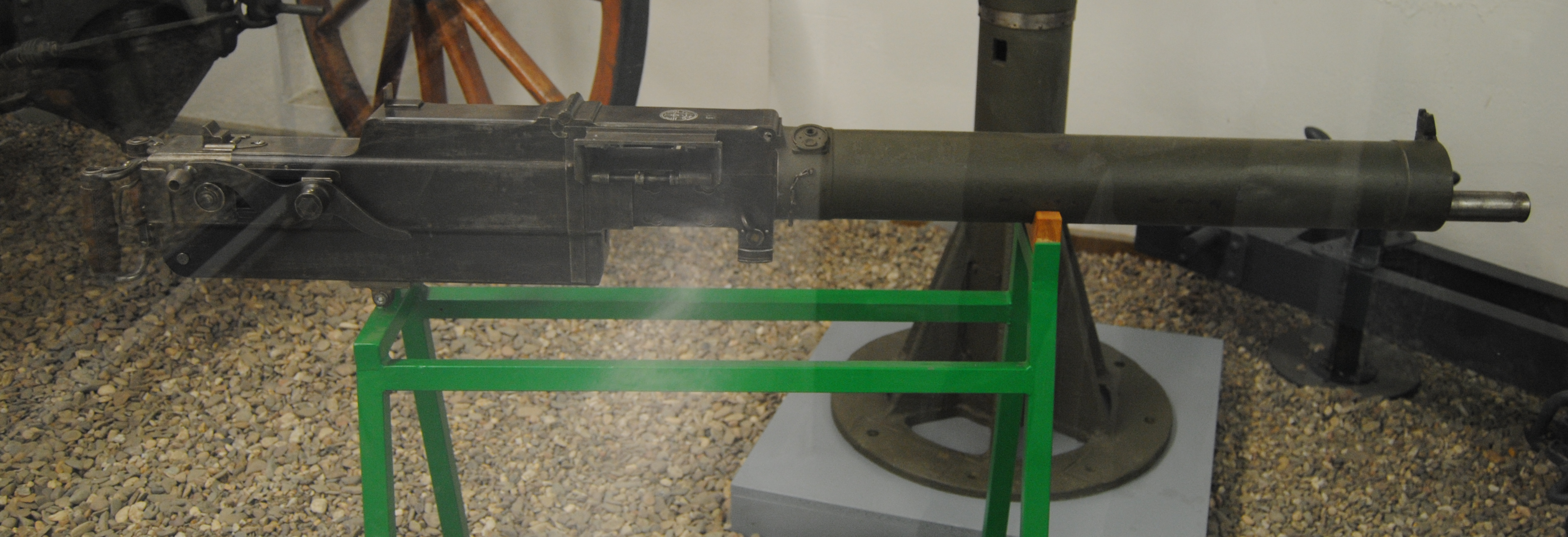
- Type: Anti-tank machine gun
- Place of origin: German Empire

Production history
- Designer: Maschinenfabrik Augsburg Nürnberg (MAN)
- Designed: 1917
- Manufacturer: MAN
- Produced: 1918
- No. built: 50

Specifications
- Mass: 133.7 kg (294.8 lb) total 37 kg (81.6 lb) gun 86 kg (189.6 lb) carriage
- Length: 1,590 mm (62.6 in)
- Barrel length: 960.1 mm (37.8 in)
- Crew: 6
- Cartridge: 13×92mm TuF (TuF variant)
- Action: Short recoil, toggle locked
- Rate of fire: 500 rpm cyclic 300 rpm practical
- Muzzle velocity: 550 m/s (1,804 ft/s)
- Effective firing range: 500 m (547 yd) horizontal
- Maximum firing range: 6,400 m (6,999 yd) horizontal 3,000 m (9,843 ft) vertical
- Feed system: 75-round belt (anti-tank); 50-round drum (anti-aircraft)

The Maschinengewehr 18 Tank und Flieger or MG 18 TuF, is a German dual-purpose heavy machine gun that was designed to fill both anti-tank and anti-aircraft roles. Developed at the end of the First World War, it fired the same 13.25 × 92mm SR or tankpatrone 18 armor-piercing round later used by the Mauser 1918 T-Gewehr anti-tank rifle.

== History ==
The genesis of the MG 18 was closely linked to the appearance of the first British and French tanks on the Western Front during 1916-1917. In October 1917, the Gewehr Prüfungs Kommission (GPK), on behalf of the Ministry of War, announced a six company competition for the construction of an automatic weapon capable of firing the new 13.25 × 92mm SR ammunition designed by the Polte cartridge factory in Magdeburg. The two finalists in this competition were Rheinmetall and Maschinenfabrik Augsburg-Nürnberg (MAN). The Rheinmetall design used a top mounted pan magazine similar to the Lewis gun, while the MAN design was a belt-fed gun. After a series of tests and modifications, the MAN design was officially adopted by the German army on August 13, 1918. It was planned that some 4,000 MG 18s would be built starting in January 1919. However, it is estimated that only 50 guns were actually built before the Armistice of 11 November 1918 and none were used in combat. Besides the end of the war, there were other factors which limited the number of MG 18s produced, such as lack of production capacity, cost, complexity, weight and poor mobility. The collapse of the German Empire and the prohibition of design and production of weapons imposed by the Versailles Treaty stopped any further development of the MG 18.

== Description ==
The MG 18 was essentially a scaled-up MG 08 heavy machine gun, the MG 08 itself being a licensed derivative of the Maxim gun. The MG 18, like the Maxim gun, was a belt-fed, water-cooled heavy machine gun which operated on the basis of short recoil and a toggle lock. Once cocked and fired, the MG 18 would continue firing rounds until the trigger was released or until all available ammunition was expended. In the anti-tank role the gun was fed by a 75-round belt, while in the anti-aircraft role it was fed by a 30-round drum magazine. Due to the weight of the gun, 133.7 kg (295 lb), a two-wheeled carriage was provided and a crew of 6 men were needed to service the gun.

The MG 18 was designed for the ammunition of the Mauser 1918 T-Gewehr anti-tank rifle. With its much shorter barrel, the muzzle velocity only reached 550 m/s (1,804 ft/s), compared to 785 m/s (2,575 ft/s) for the Mauser 1918; however, this was still sufficient to penetrate 20 mm (0.79 in) of face-hardened steel armor plate at 100 m (110 yd), and 15 mm (0.59 in) at 300 m (330 yd).

== See also ==
- Hotchkiss 13.2 mm machine gun, French inter-war period 13.2mm heavy machine gun
- M2 Browning, American inter-war period 12.7mm heavy machine gun
- MG 131 machine gun, World War II 13 mm German aircraft-mounted gun
- DShK, NSV, and Kord, Soviet/Russian 12.7 mm machine guns.
