= 13.2×92mmSR =

Anti-tank rifle cartridge

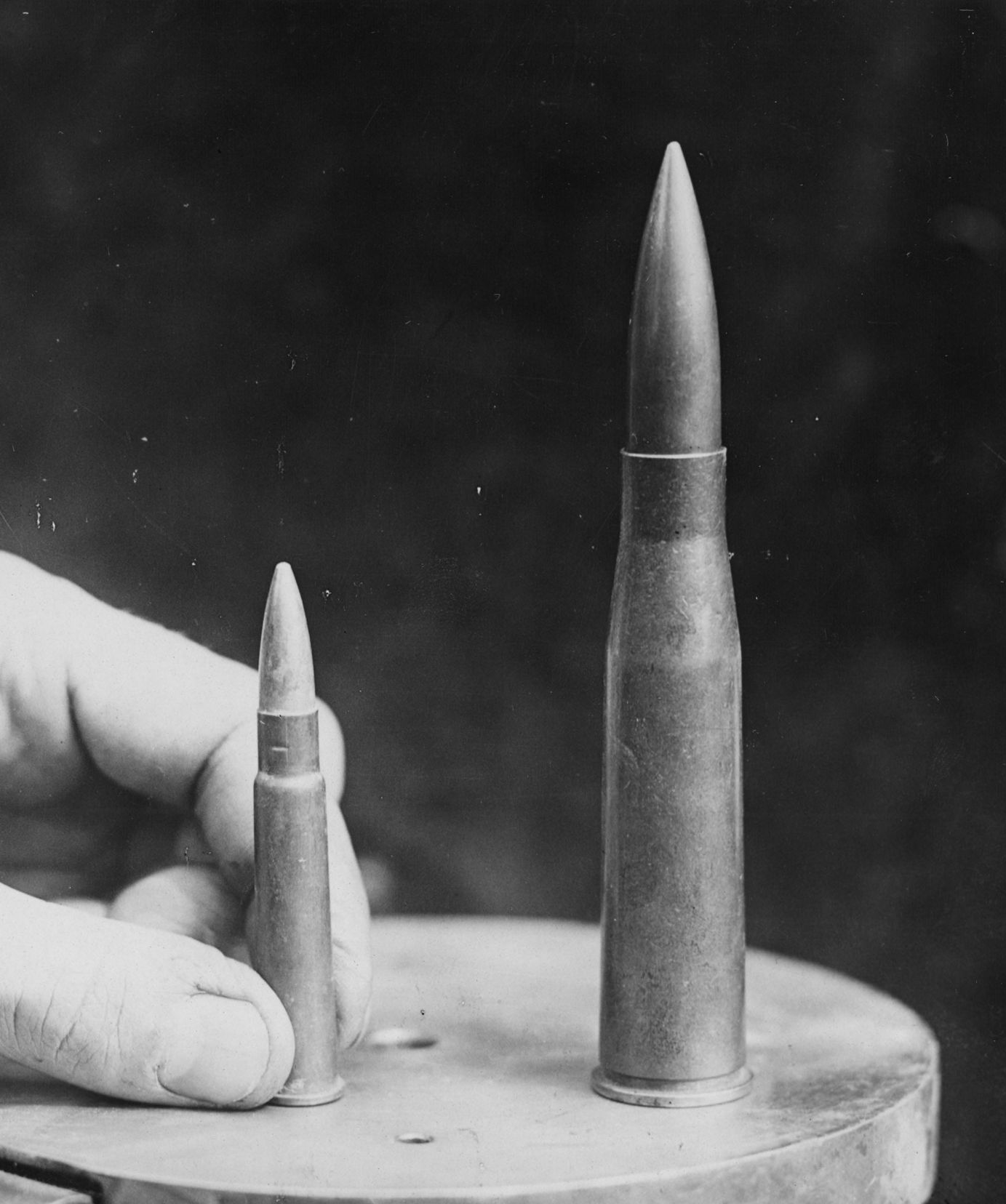
- Comparison of British .303 (left) and German 13.2 mm Tuf (right).
- Type: Anti-tank rifle Heavy machine gun
- Place of origin: German Empire

Service history
- In service: 1918–1919
- Wars: World War I

Production history
- Designed: 1917

Specifications
- Bullet diameter: 13.2 mm (0.525 in)
- Neck diameter: 14.6 mm (0.57 in)
- Shoulder diameter: 19.1 mm (0.75 in)
- Base diameter: 20.9 mm (0.82 in)
- Rim diameter: 23.1 mm (0.91 in)
- Case length: 91.3 mm (3.59 in)
- Overall length: 132.6 mm (5.22 in)

Ballistic performance
Bullet mass/type	Velocity	Energy
51.5 g (795 gr) Solid	785 m/s (2,580 ft/s)	15,868 J (11,704 ft⋅lbf)
- Test barrel length: 39"

The 13.2×92mmSR, also known as Mauser 13.2 mm TuF (German: Tank und Flieger; literally "tank and aircraft", historical military designation), is a semi-rimmed rifle and machine gun cartridge developed by the German Empire for anti-tank and anti-aircraft use which was introduced during World War I. The cartridge was a major step in the development of anti-tank cartridges, being the first one designed for the sole purpose of destroying armored targets.

== History ==
The cartridge was used in the Mauser Tankgewehr M1918 anti-tank rifle. Its use was also planned in a new heavy machine gun scheduled for deployment in 1919, the MG 18 TuF.

The 13.2 mm Tuf was designed to counter early British tanks which made their appearance during late World War I. Since a tank's path was difficult to determine prior to its deployment near the front, land mines were difficult to employ as a deterrent to their forward passage. Light artillery pieces pressed into service as anti-tank guns were very effective, but cumbersome and difficult to bring into action quickly enough. Thus, another means of combating these early armored vehicles needed to be found. Since early plate armor was relatively thin due to the need to reduce vehicle weight for low-powered drive trains to propel the unit (and since tanks were mainly designed to protect from machine-gun fire), large-bore rifles could be used to harass and kill tank crews.

When word of the German anti-tank round spread, there was some debate amongst Allied militaries as to whether it should be copied and used as the basis for a new machine gun cartridge. However, after some analysis, an exact copy of the German ammunition was ruled out. Firstly, its performance was regarded as inadequate (compared, for example, to the later .50 BMG – which itself may be regarded as enlarged .30-06 Springfield round and has - therefore - a preceding German Mauser round). Secondly, the 13.2 mm round was a semi-rimmed cartridge, making it sub-optimal for automatic weapons. Nevertheless, when the US military learned of the German round, the .50 BMG was still on the design stage; the fact that the .50 BMG was started prior to discovery of the German round can in no way rule out the possibility that the German round played a significant part in formulating the .50 BMG parameters (even though) the latter emerged with significantly different performance characteristics.

== Design ==
The 13.2 Tuf utilized a 92 mm-long semi-rimmed case featuring a shallow bottle-neck. It was developed by the Polte ammunition factory in Magdeburg, Germany.

== See also ==
- List of rifle cartridges
- 13 mm caliber
