= Polte ammunition factory =

Ammunition factory in Magdeburg, Germany

In the first half of the 20th century, the firm of Polte Armaturen- und Maschinenfabrik OHG in Magdeburg, Germany was an important manufacturer of large fittings and one of the largest ammunition producers in the world. The group was one of the most important employers in Magdeburg, a pioneer in the construction of sanitary and social facilities for employees and workers and internationally appreciated for the engineering quality of its products. After the Second World War, it was mainly known for the mass employment of forced laborers and concentration camp prisoners (from June 1943 until the end of the war, by which time some 50% of the workforce were of this category). The parts of the Polte-Werke that were not destroyed during the war or transported away by the Soviet occupying forces as reparations were later merged into the VEB Schwerarmaturenwerk "Erich Weinert" and the resulting VEB Magdeburger Armaturenwerke "Karl Marx".

== History ==
The company was founded in 1873 as a metal foundry and fittings factory under the Jürgens & Co. company. It was taken over by Eugen Polte in 1885 and entered in the commercial register in 1887 as Armaturenfabrik Polte ('Fittings Factory Polte'). The company operated under the name of Polte (often referred to as Polte-Werke) from 1885 to 1945. During this 60-year period, the company remained a family business and was owner-managed. On Eugen Polte's death in 1911, running the Polte works was continued by his sons-in-law Martin Nathusius and Arnulf Freiherr von Gillern; it expanded to become one of the largest German ammunition suppliers before and during the Second World War.

In contemporary catalogues, price lists and advertisements, the company appeared under names such as Polte metal goods factory, Polte fittings and machine factory, Polte machine tools, Polte aluminum factory, Polte fittings and water meter factories, Polte cartridge, ammunition machine and fittings factory, Polte fittings and cartridge factory or Polte Munitions Factory – with or without the addition of 'Magdeburg'.

C. Louis Strube AG of Magdeburg belonged to Polte-Werke from 1913 onwards. (Note: C. Louis Strube's machine and fittings factory was established in 1864 on Porsestraße in Magdeburg-Buckau. Managed as a stock corporation from 1889, it specialized in the manufacture of and trade in machines, fittings, pumps, metal goods and related items. After the takeover by Polte-Werke, it traded under Maschinen- und Armaturenfabrik Magdeburg-Buckau.)

From 1931, around a dozen other production facilities outside Magdeburg, mainly in central Germany at the time, were taken over, built or leased and operated as branches or subsidiaries; in addition to the main plant ("old plant") in Magdeburg-Sudenburg, another plant in Sudenburg (the Fichtestraße plant) and the "plant II" (or "new plant") in Magdeburg-Wilhelmstadt, the Polte works operated 15 other factories in Germany until 1945. These plants were partly subsidiaries and partly Reich-owned or third-party plants that were leased and operated by Polte oHG.

=== Subsidiaries ===
- 1913: C. Louis Strube AG in Magdeburg-Buckau, renamed Maschinen- und Armaturenfabrik AG
- 1931: Grüneberger Metallwarenfabrik GmbH in Grüneberg
- 1932: Pollux GmbH in Ludwigshafen am Rhein, a water meter and valve factory with a branch in Neustadt (1939) (Note: After the war Spanner-Pollux GmbH or Pollux Meter GmbH & Co. KG ("Pollux Meter Group"), taken over by the British BTR Group in 1997, since 2003 part of Sensus Metering Systems Inc., the world's largest manufacturer of water measuring valves)
- 1933: Metallwerk Wolfenbüttel GmbH in Wolfenbüttel, production of ammunition for rifles and machine guns
- 1933: Metallwerk Odertal GmbH in Bad Lauterberg in the Harz Mountains, manufacturer of cartridges for the Wehrmacht; With more than 2,000 employees at the beginning of 1944, the company was one of the largest companies in the region.
- 1938: Castor GmbH in Magdeburg

=== Second World War ===
By 1945, Polte-Werke had grown into an armaments group with several subsidiaries, branches and subsidiary companies. At the end of the war, around 30,000 people worked in all the plants operated by Polte oHG, around half of them in four factories in Magdeburg.

== Subcamps for Polte-Werke ==
From 1943, concentration camp prisoners were used in production at various Polte-Werke sites. They had to work in the regeneration of used cases, in the production of new ammunition, in the paint shop and electroplating as well as in warehousing/loading. Some prisoners were also employed in factory canteens or camp kitchens. The work normally took place in two shifts of twelve hours each. The prisoners mostly had to work piecework. In addition to beatings by the concentration camp supervisory staff, there were also abuses by German workers and master craftsmen (who were the prisoners' technical superiors). Those unable to work were sent back to the respective concentration camp mother camps. There were numerous deaths from malnutrition and disease.

There were subcamps housing these workers at the main Polte works in Magdeburg-Stadtfeld (one each for women and men, subcamps of Buchenwald concentration camp), as well as at works operated by Polte in Duderstadt (Lager Steinhoff, a subcamp of Bergen-Belsen), Genthin Grüneberg (a subcamp of Ravensbrück, supplying workers to Silva Metallwerk), Seehausen (a subcamp of Dachau) and Arnstadt (Rudisleben, another subcamp of Buchenwald). (Note: There was another concentration camp satellite camp at the Draht- und Metallwaren-Fabrik GmbH in Salzwedel. It is conceivable that this factory was managed by the Polte-Werke, but so far cannot be proven.)

== Bibliography ==
Martin Nathusius: The "Magdeburg Line" of the Nathusius family, illustrated lineage. IRL Imprimeries Reunies Lausanne, Saint-Sulpice (Switzerland) 1985. (Open Library: OL24730576M)
