= Mauser Tankgewehr M1918 =

German anti-tank rifle

Mauser Mod. 1918 13.2 mm Tankgewehr
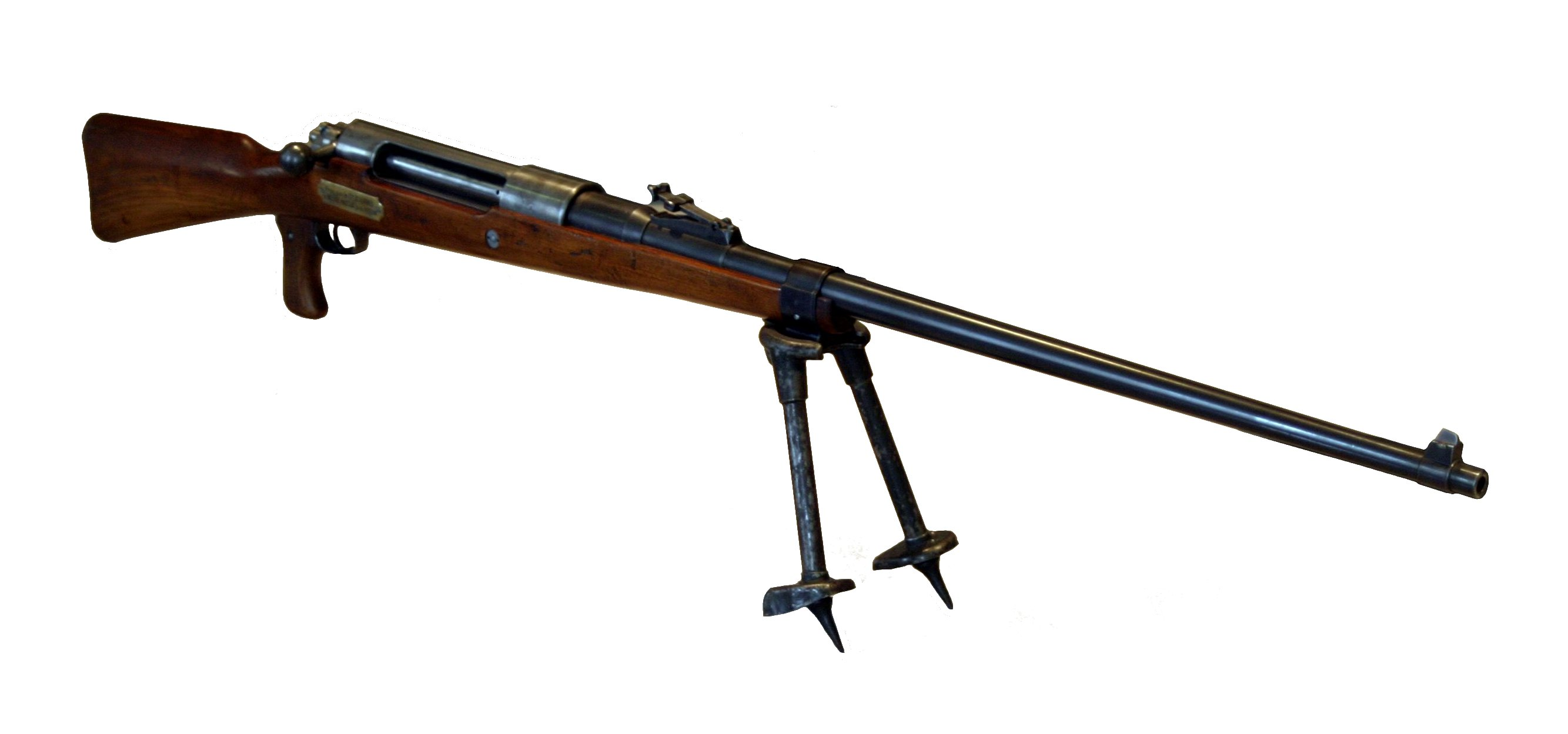
- 13.2 mm Rifle Anti-Tank at the Musée de l'Armée in Paris
- Type: Anti-tank rifle Anti-materiel rifle
- Place of origin: German Empire

Service history
- In service: 1918–1933
- Used by: German Empire; Weimar Republic; Sweden; Republic of the Rif
- Wars: World War I; German Revolution of 1918–1919; Rif War

Production history
- Manufacturer: Mauser
- Produced: January 1918 – April 1919
- No. built: 16,900
- Variants: M1918 shortened Magazine-fed

Specifications
- Mass: 15.9 kg (35 lb), 18.5 kg (41 lb) loaded with the bipod
- Length: 169.1 cm (5 ft 7 in)
- Barrel length: 98.4 cm (3 ft 2.7 in)
- Crew: two-man crew
- Cartridge: 13.2 mm TuF (German: Tank und Flieger)
- Caliber: 13.2 mm (.525 inches)
- Action: bolt-action
- Rate of fire: single-shot
- Muzzle velocity: 780 m/s (2,600 ft/s)
- Effective firing range: 500 m (550 yd)
- Feed system: manual
- Sights: 100–500 m (110–550 yd) (notched V)

The Tankgewehr M1918 (transl. Tankgun), also known as the Mauser 13mm anti-tank rifle and T-Gewehr in English, is a German anti-tank rifle—the first rifle designed for the sole purpose of destroying armored targets—and the only anti-tank rifle to see service in World War I. Approximately 16,900 were produced.

== History ==
During the First World War the onset of static, trench warfare saw the rise in the use of armour plate for personal defense, and the development and use of armour-piercing ammunition to counter this. Both Britain and Germany used high-powered rifles, such as elephant guns from their African colonies, for this purpose. The first use of armoured fighting vehicles (tanks) was by the British at the Battle of Flers–Courcelette in September 1916 and were followed by the French. By June 1917, the German Army faced the Mark IV tank, and found that the standard armour-piercing 7.92 mm K bullet was no longer effective. This prompted the development by the Germans of a heavy-calibre and high-velocity rifle as an anti-tank weapon. The makers of the gun were inspired by weapons used to hunt African big game, like the elephant gun. The Mauser Company responded with the 13mm T-gewehr and began mass production at Oberndorf am Neckar in May 1918. The first of these off the production lines were issued to specially raised anti-tank detachments.

14,700 T-Gewehrs were produced before the Armistice, and production ceased in April 1919. Approximately 1,490 were produced after the cessation of hostilities.

== Operation ==
The rifle was a single-shot bolt-action rifle using a modified Mauser action, with rounds manually loaded into the chamber. The weapon had a pistol grip and bipod, but no method of reducing recoil, such as a soft buttpad or muzzle brake. This could cause problems for the shooter with repeated firing. The iron sights were composed of a front blade and tangent rear, graduated in 100-meter increments from 100 to 500 meters. The rifle was operated by a two-man crew of a gunner and ammunition bearer, who were both trained to fire the weapon. Due to the tremendous blunt force of the recoil, it was designed to be shot in a static position, either prone or from inside a trench.

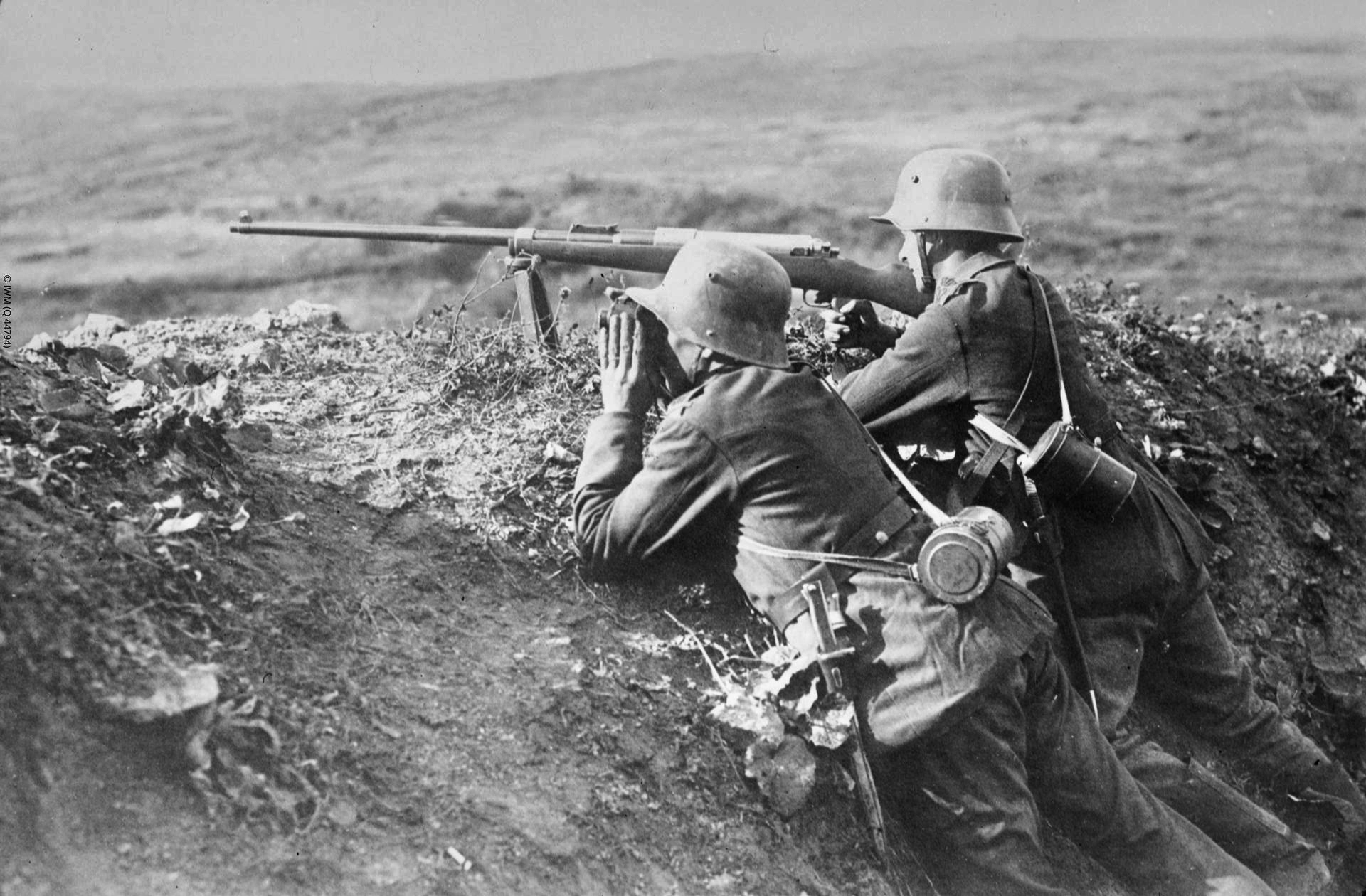
Imperial German Army soldiers firing a Mauser 1918 T-Gewehr

== Post-war service ==
The United States Army tested the T-Gewehr after the war, as did the other Allied Powers. Poland obtained a few T-Gewehrs during border skirmishes at the German border in 1920.

The Reichswehr kept some M1918s in service into the 1930s (805 were in the secret arsenals of the Reichswehr in 1925). Sweden bought a number from Germany, and used them under the designation Pansarvärnsgevär m/21. During the Rif War, the Rifian rebels obtained some smuggled Mauser 1918s to counter the Spanish Renault and Schneider tanks.

In 1939, a Soviet team led by V.N. Shokolov retro-engineered the T-Gewehr, modified to fire the Soviet 12.7×108mm B-32 bullets. Small numbers were hand-produced by the Bauman Institute in the emergency of July 1941. After the Winter War, Finland bought 100 T-Gewehr from Great Britain but they were never used and Finland scrapped them in 1944.

== Cartridge ==
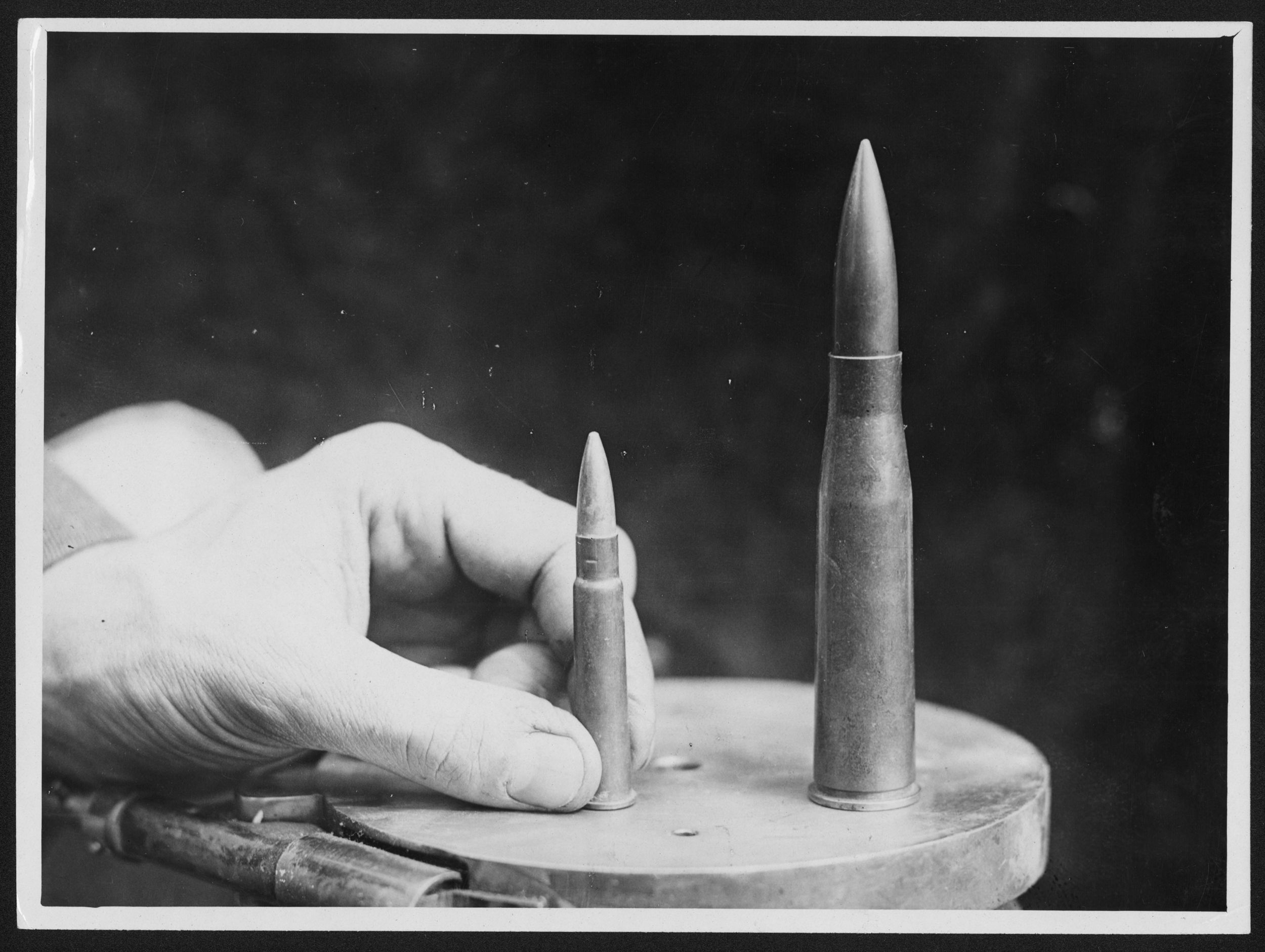
Comparison of a standard .303 British rifle cartridge and a 13.2 mm T-Gewehr cartridge

The armour-piercing hardened steel cored 13.2×92mm (.525-inch) semi-rimmed cartridge, often simply called "13 mm", was originally planned for a new, heavy Maxim MG.18 water-cooled machine gun, the Tank und Flieger (TuF) meaning for use against "tank and aircraft", which was under development and to be fielded in 1919. The rounds weighed 51.5 g (795 gn) with an initial velocity of 785 m/s (2,580 ft/s).

Range	Penetration @ 90°
100 m (110 yd)	26 mm (1 in)
200 m (220 yd)	23.5 mm (0.93 in)
400 m (440 yd)	21.5 mm (0.85 in)
500 m (550 yd)	18 mm (0.71 in)

== Surviving examples ==
Examples of the Mauser 1918 anti-tank rifle can be found in several museums:

- Argentina
  - Museo de Armas, Circulo Militar, Buenos Aires
  - Museo de Armas, Colegio Militar de la Nación, El Palomar
  - Museo de la Ciudad, San Carlos de Bariloche
- Australia
  - Army Museum Bandiana in Wodonga
  - Queensland Museum, Brisbane
  - Mialls Gun Shop, Melbourne
  - Australian War Memorial, Canberra
  - Rocky Hill War Memorial, Goulburn
- Austria
  - Museum of Military History, Vienna
- Belgium
  - In Flanders Fields Museum, Ypres
  - In Royal Museum of the Armed Forces and Military History, Brussels
  - Passchendaele Museum, Zonnebeke
- Canada
  - On display in the lobby of the McGill club, Montreal, being the gift made in 1919 by a Canadian general
  - The Officers and Non-Commissioned Officers Mess of the South Alberta Light Horse in Medicine Hat, Alberta
  - The Officers Mess of the Barrack Green Armories in Saint John, New Brunswick
- China
  - In Huaihai Campaign Commemoration Hall, Xuzhou City, Jiangsu Province
- France
  - The Musée de l'Armée at the Invalides, Paris
  - The Batterie Todt museum near Cape Gris Nez
- Germany
  - Herzog Anton Ulrich Museum in Braunschweig
  - Museum im Schwedenbau in Oberndorf am Neckar
- Italy
  - The National Museum of Artillery in Turin
- Latvia
  - Latvian War Museum
- Luxembourg
  - National Museum of Military History in Diekirch
- United Kingdom
  - Lancashire Infantry Museum, Preston
  - Imperial War Museum, London
  - Canterbury Heritage Museum Canterbury
  - King's Own Royal Border Regiment museum
  - 22nd Cheshire Regiment museum
  - Royal Armouries Museum in Leeds
  - Norwich Castle Museum, Norwich
  - Redoubt Fortress and Museum, Eastbourne
  - King's Shropshire Light Infantry museum, Shrewsbury castle
  - Norris Museum, St Ives, Huntingdonshire
  - Heugh Battery Museum, Hartlepool
  - Worcester Art Gallery And Museum, Worcester.
  - Royal Ulster Rifles Museum, Belfast
- United States
  - U.S. Army Armor & Cavalry Collection, Fort Benning
  - The National World War I Museum and Liberty Memorial in Kansas City, Missouri
  - NRA National Firearms Museum in Fairfax, Virginia
  - Woodrow Wilson Presidential Library, Staunton, Virginia
  - Iowa Gold Star Military Museum, Camp Dodge, Iowa
  - Maryland Museum of Military History in Baltimore, Maryland
  - North Dakota Heritage Center in Bismarck, North Dakota
  - Clark Brothers gun store Opal Virginia
  - Klamath County Museums in Klamath Falls, Oregon
  - International Ordnance Museum in St Jo, Texas
  - National Museum of the Marine Corps in Quantico, Virginia
  - Virginia War Museum in Newport News, Virginia

== See also ==
- Bazooka
- Anti-tank rifle
- Boys anti-tank rifle
- Lahti L-39
- Panzerbüchse 39
- PTRD-41 ― Mass produced competing design to the PTRS
- PTRS-41 ― Mass produced competing design to the PTRD
- Solothurn S-18/100
- Type 97 automatic cannon
- Wz. 35 anti-tank rifle
- MG 18 TuF
