= M10 =

M10, M-10 or M 10 may refer to:

== Science and technology ==
- Messier 10, a globular cluster in the constellation Ophiuchus
- M10, a Garmin Nüvifone smartphone
- Samsung Galaxy M10, a smartphone
- M10 (rocket engine), a rocket engine
- The Olivetti M10, a variant of the TRS-80 Model 100 notebook
- McLaren M10, a Formula 5000 racing car

== Transportation ==
=== Bus routes ===
- M10 (New York City bus), a New York City Bus route in Manhattan, US
- M10 (New York City bus franchise), a New York City Bus route in Manhattan, US now named M21

=== Rail lines ===
- M10 (Istanbul Metro), Turkey

=== Roads ===
- M10 motorway (Great Britain), a former designation for a motorway in Hertfordshire, England
- M-10 (Michigan highway), a road in Michigan
- M10 (East London), a Metropolitan Route in East London, South Africa
- M10 (Cape Town), a Metropolitan Route in Cape Town, South Africa
- M10 (Johannesburg), a Metropolitan Route in Johannesburg, South Africa
- M10 (Pretoria), a Metropolitan Route in Pretoria, South Africa
- M10 (Durban), a Metropolitan Route in Durban, South Africa
- M10 (Bloemfontein), a Metropolitan Route in Bloemfontein, South Africa
- M10 (Port Elizabeth), a Metropolitan Route in Port Elizabeth, South Africa
- M10 (Pietermaritzburg), a Metropolitan Route in Pietermaritzburg, South Africa
- M10 motorway (Pakistan), a road located in Sindh province
- M10 highway (Russia), a road connecting Saint Petersburg and Moscow
- Highway M10 (Ukraine), a road in Ukraine
- M10 road (Zambia), a road in Zambia
- M10 road (Malawi), a road in Malawi

=== Vehicles and engines ===
- BMW M10, an I4 piston engine produced from 1961 to 1987
- Mooney M10 Cadet, an aircraft once produced by the Mooney Airplane company
- Noble M10, a British sports car built by Noble Automotive Ltd
- Sri Lanka Railways M10, diesel-electric locomotives

== Firearms and military ==
- M10 tank destroyer, a US tank destroyer used in World War II
- M10 Booker, an armored fighting vehicle
- 152 mm howitzer M1938 (M-10), a Soviet howitzer used in World War II
- MAC-10, a machine pistol manufactured in the US
- Remington Model 10, a US WWI-era pump-action shotgun
- M10, a modern rifle based on the No. 4 action produced in Australia
- M.10, a German World War I prototype base for one of the two Fokker B.II
- M10, a scabbard for the M7 bayonet

== Other uses ==
- M10 (political party), in Romania
- M10, an ISO metric screw thread gauge
- Magic 2010, the eleventh core set in Magic: The Gathering
- M10 (panel building), a high rise apartment building type in East Germany
- M10, a difficulty grade in mixed climbing

== See also ==
- Model 10 (disambiguation)
- M2010 Enhanced Sniper Rifle
- M1910 (disambiguation)
- MX (disambiguation)
