= XMSS =

XMSS may refer to:

- Extended Merkle signature scheme, a type of hash-based cryptography
- Xinmin Secondary School, a secondary school in Hougang, Singapore
- Xiamen Shuangshi High School

== See also ==
- XMS (disambiguation)
- XMMS
