= 152 mm howitzer M1943 (D-1) =

D-1 howitzer
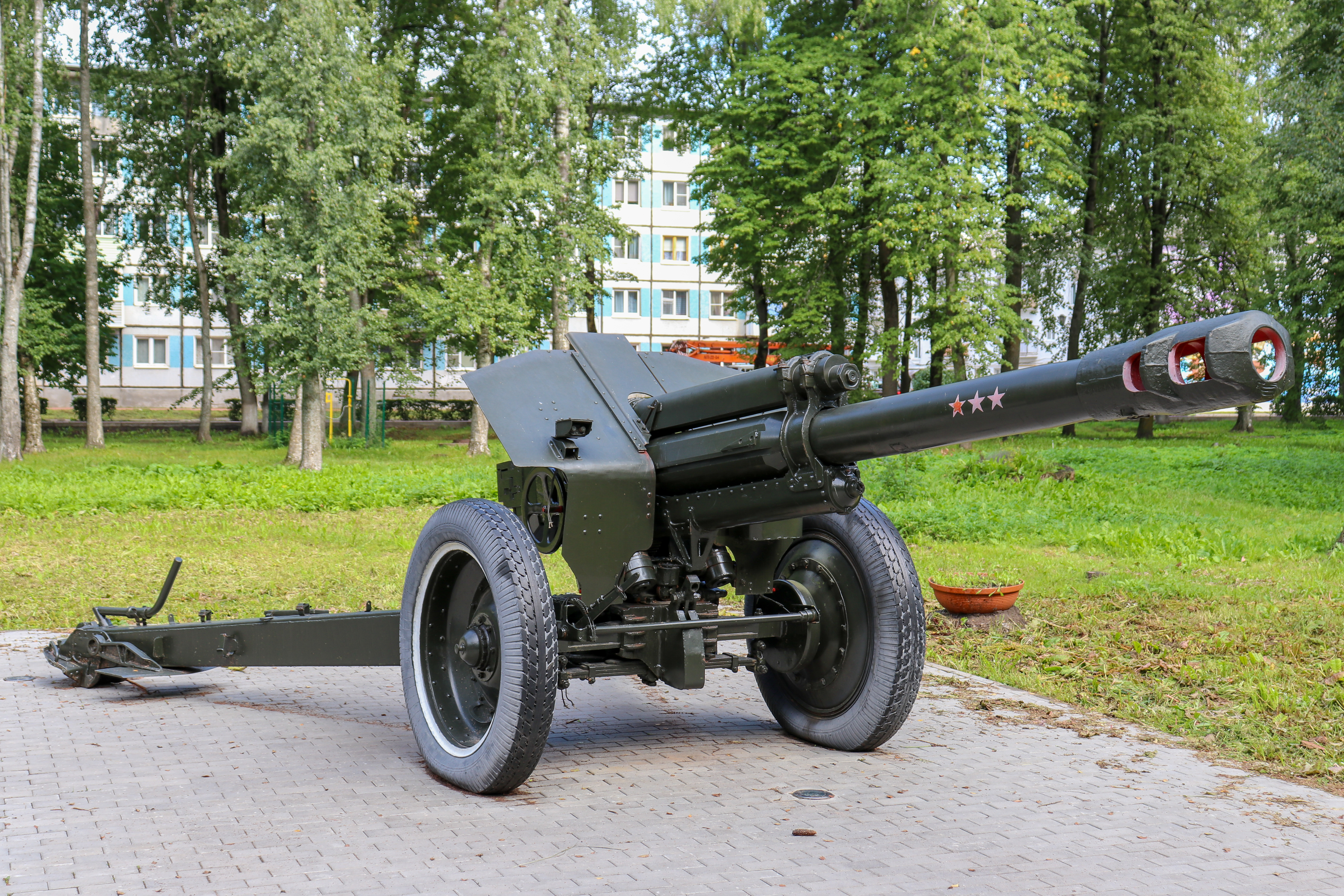
- Type: Field howitzer
- Place of origin: Soviet Union

Service history
- In service: 1943–present
- Used by: See operators
- Wars: World War II; Arab-Israeli War; Vietnam War; 2016 Nagorno-Karabakh conflict Second Nagorno-Karabakh War; Russo-Ukrainian war

Production history
- Designer: F. F. Petrov
- Designed: 1943
- Manufacturer: No. 9 Plant
- Produced: 1943–1949
- No. built: 2,827
- Variants: D-15, M1943/85

Specifications
- Mass: 3,600 kg (7,937 lbs)
- Length: 6.7 m (22 ft)
- Barrel length: Bore: 3.527 m (11 ft 7 in) L/23
- Width: 1.9 m (6 ft 3 in)
- Height: 1.8 m (5 ft 11 in)
- Crew: 8
- Shell: Separate loading charge and projectile HE; 40 kg (88.2 lb)
- Caliber: 152.4 mm (6 in)
- Breech: Interrupted screw
- Recoil: Hydro-pneumatic
- Carriage: Split trail
- Elevation: -3° to 63.5°
- Traverse: ±17.5°
- Rate of fire: 3–4 rounds/min
- Muzzle velocity: 508 m/s (1,666 ft/s)
- Maximum firing range: 12.4 km (7.70 mi)

The 152 mm howitzer M1943 (D-1) (Russian: 152-mm gaubitsa obr. 1943 g. (D-1)) is a Soviet World War II-era 152.4 mm howitzer. The gun was developed by the design bureau headed by F. F. Petrov in 1942 and 1943, based on the carriage of the 122 mm howitzer M1938 (M-30) and using the barrel of the 152 mm howitzer M1938 (M-10). The powerful and mobile D-1, with its wide range of ammunition, significantly increased the firepower and breakthrough abilities of Red Army tank and motor rifle formations. Several hundred D-1s were manufactured before the end of World War II.

Post World War II, the D-1 saw combat in numerous conflicts during the mid- to late 20th century. The long operational history of D-1 howitzers in national armies of numerous countries is a testimony to its qualities; the gun still remains in service in a number of post-Soviet states and some other countries. The D-1 is widely considered a valuable element of Soviet artillery.

== Development and production ==
=== Background ===
In 1941 the Soviet Union decided to cease production of the 152 mm howitzer M1938 (M-10). One of the reasons was the disbanding of the Rifle Corps between August and September 1941 and the consequent removal of the corps artillery. Moreover, all 152 mm howitzers were excluded from divisional artillery. As a result, there was no series production of 152 mm howitzers during 1942.

However, the rifle corps were re-established in late 1942 and the previous organization of artillery at the corps level was reintroduced. As a result of the halting of 152 mm howitzer production, the Red Army corps artillery lacked a weapon more mobile than the heavy 152 mm howitzer-gun M1937 (ML-20) (typically employed by army-level and Reserve of the Main Command artillery units), but more powerful than the 122 mm howitzer M1938 (M-30).

=== Response to the challenge ===
In 1942, trying to solve the problem of lack of a suitable mobile 152 mm howitzer, the design bureau headed by F. F. Petrov started to work privately on a new howitzer, based on the carriage of the M-30 and the barrel of the M-10 (which was fitted with a muzzle brake in order to reduce the recoil and thus prevent damage to the lighter carriage). The approach allowed production to begin on the new howitzer almost immediately from the stockpile of parts for both earlier guns. Given the war situation and shortages of artillery, this solution was both elegant and expedient.

Early in 1943 Petrov notified the People's Commissar of Armaments Dmitriy Ustinov about the new project. On 13 April Ustinov informed Petrov that the State Committee of Defence had requested for five of the new guns to be sent to the testing grounds on 1 May. On 5 May, two pieces were received for trials; two days later, on 7 May the gun was recommended for adoption, and on 8 August 1943 it was officially adopted as the 152 mm howitzer M1943. One and a half months later, the first series production D-1 howitzers were delivered to the Red Army representatives.

=== Production ===
The D-1 was manufactured solely at No. 9 Plant (UZTM) in Sverdlovsk from late 1943 to 1949. During World War II, the howitzer was only produced in small numbers because Plant No. 9 was also responsible for the mass production of the 122 mm howitzer M-30. This resulted in critical shortages of the 152 mm howitzers in the Red Army corps artillery until the end of the war.

Production of D-1, pcs.
Year	1943	1944	1945	1946	1947	1948	1949	Total
Number produced	84	258	715	1,050	240	240	240	2,827

== Description ==
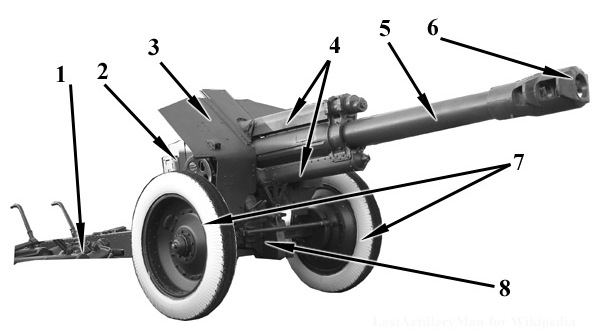
Components of D-1 howitzer: 1 – split trails 2 – breachblock 3 – gunshield 4 – recoil devices (buffer and recuperator) 5 – barrel 6 – muzzle brake 7 – wheels 8 – suspension Parts 1, 7 and 8 belong to the carriage; 2, 4, 5 and 6 make the barrel group

The D-1 howitzer was essentially a combination of the barrel of the 152-mm howitzer model 1938 (M-10) on the carriage of the 122-mm howitzer M1938 (M-30). Since the new carriage was lighter than that of the M-10, the barrel was fitted with a massive double-baffle muzzle brake DT-3 to soften the shock of recoil. The breech block was of interrupted screw type, the recoil system consisted of a hydraulic buffer and a hydro-pneumatic recuperator. The separately loaded ammunition included a variety of shells and eight different propellant charges in cartridges.

The carriage was nearly identical to the carriage of the M-30. It had suspension and steel wheels with pneumatic rubber tires. The trails were initially of riveted construction, but were eventually replaced in production by welded ones. Late production pieces were equipped with caster wheels to ease manhandling. Time to set up for combat was about two minutes. In an emergency it was possible to fire without splitting trails; however this was at the price of a drastically reduced traverse (1°30'). Since the gun was not equipped with a limber, it could be towed only by vehicle. The maximum towing speed was 40 km/h on paved roads, 30 km/h on cobbled roads and 10 km/h off-road. To give the crew some protection from bullets and shell fragments, the gun was fitted with a shield.

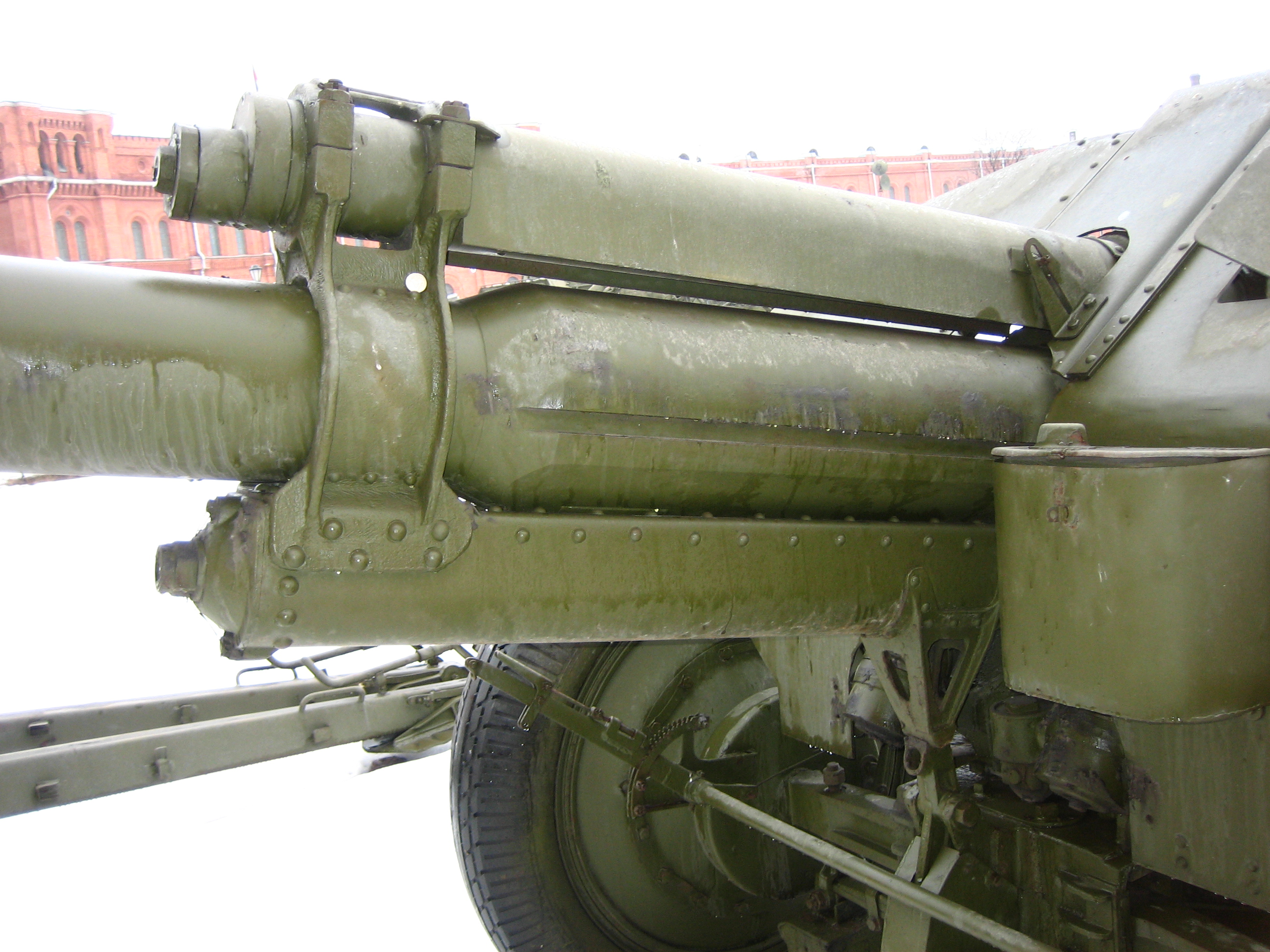
Recoil devices

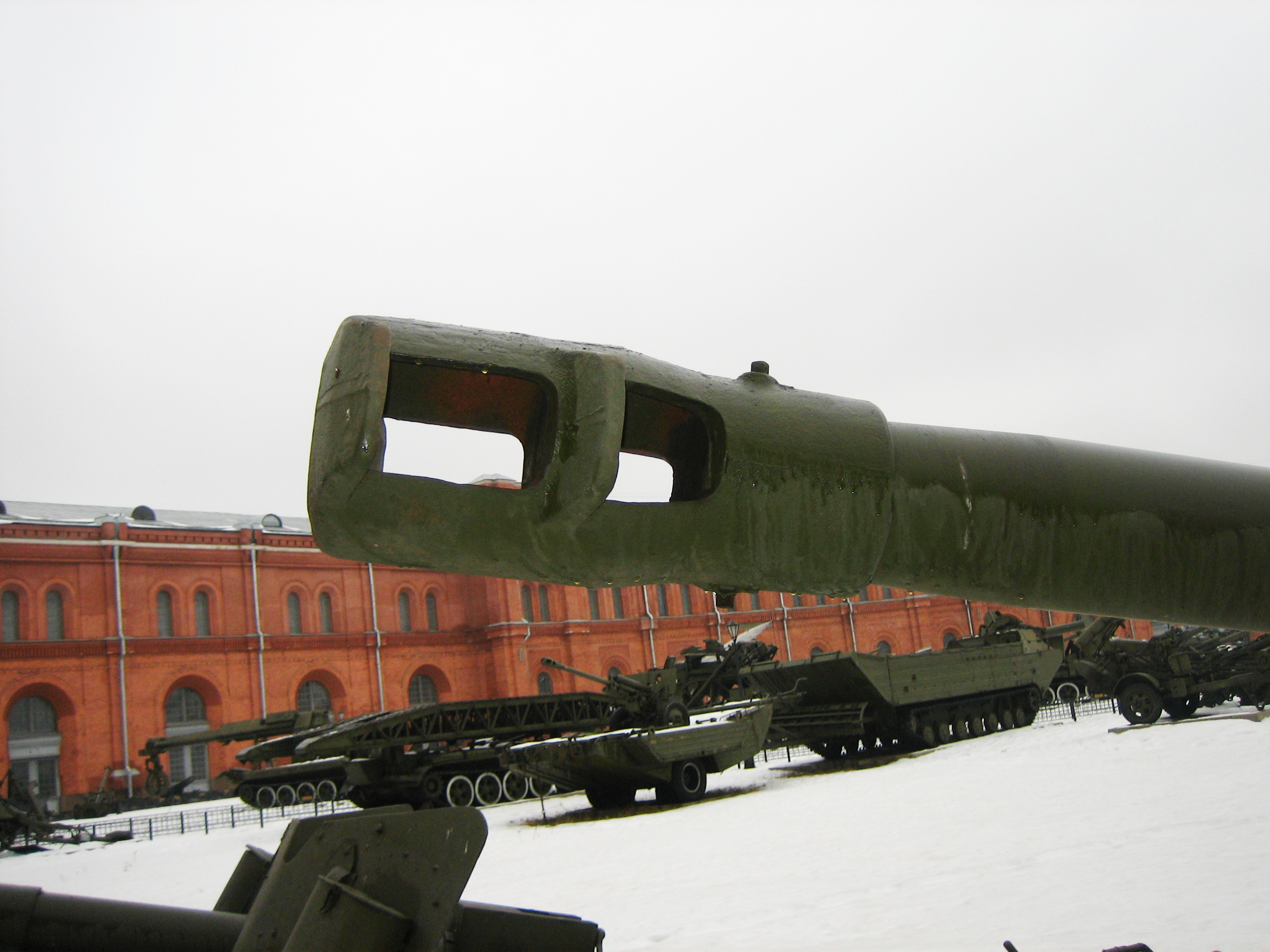
Muzzle brake

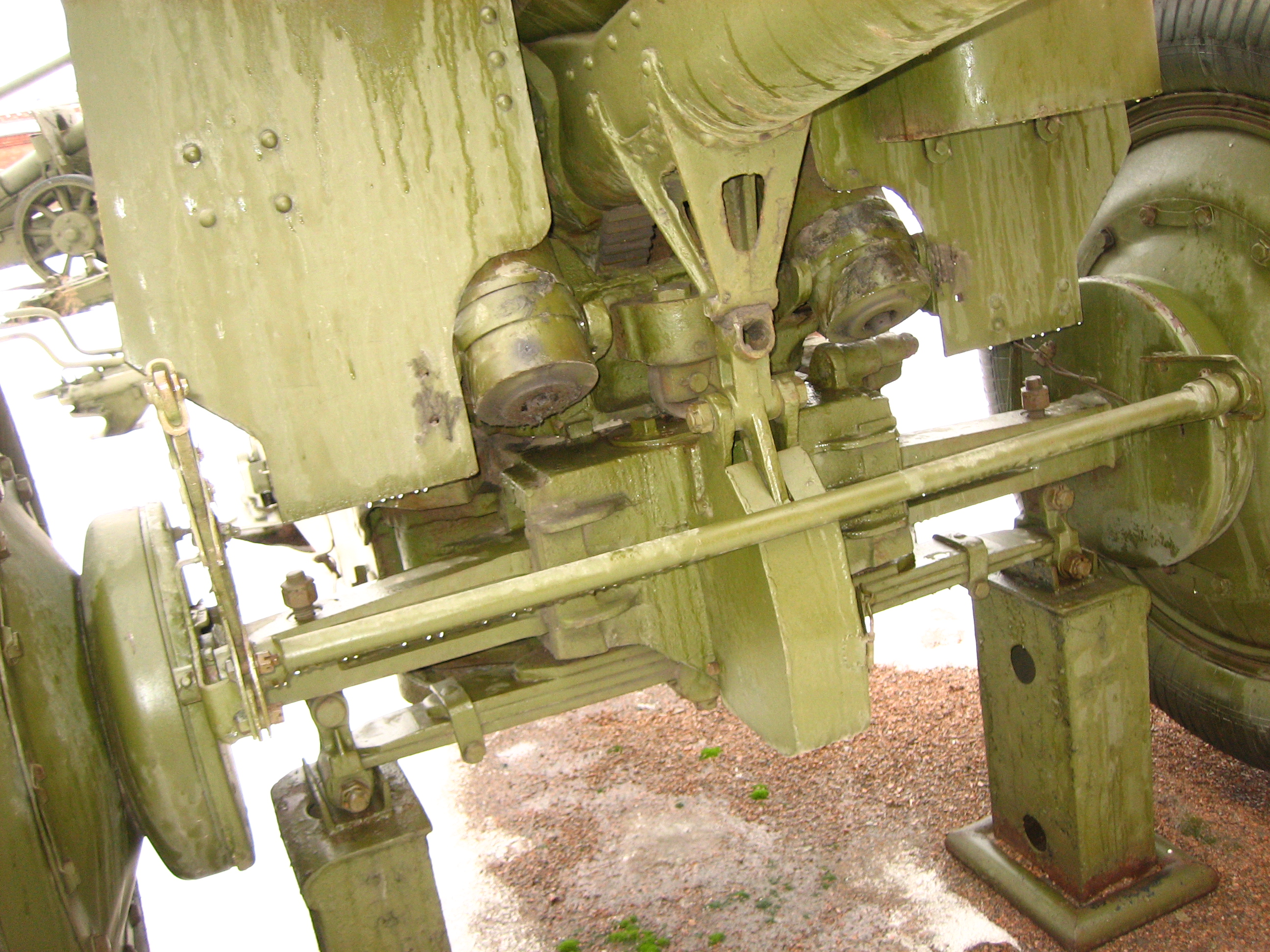
Carriage suspension

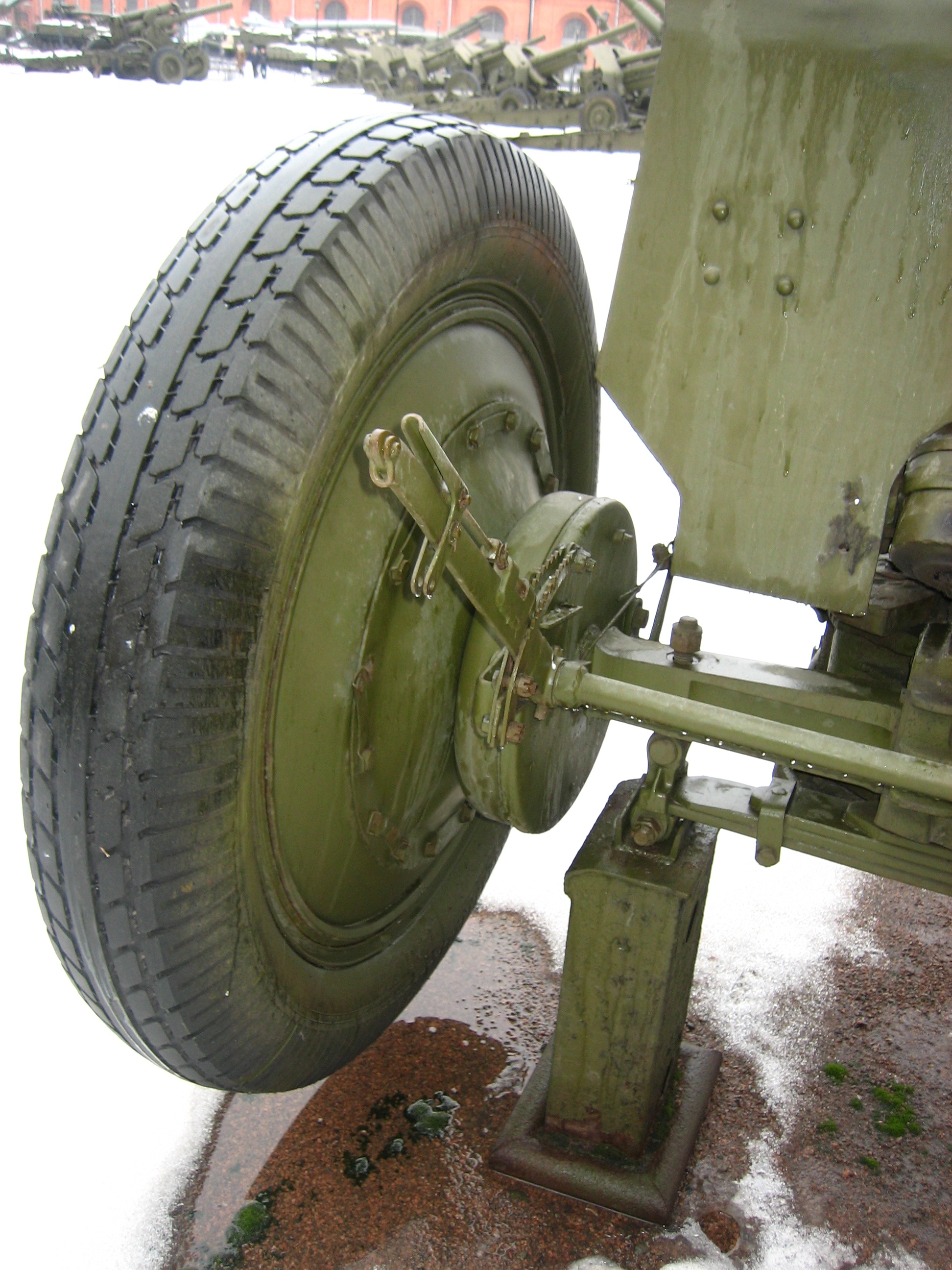
Carriage suspension

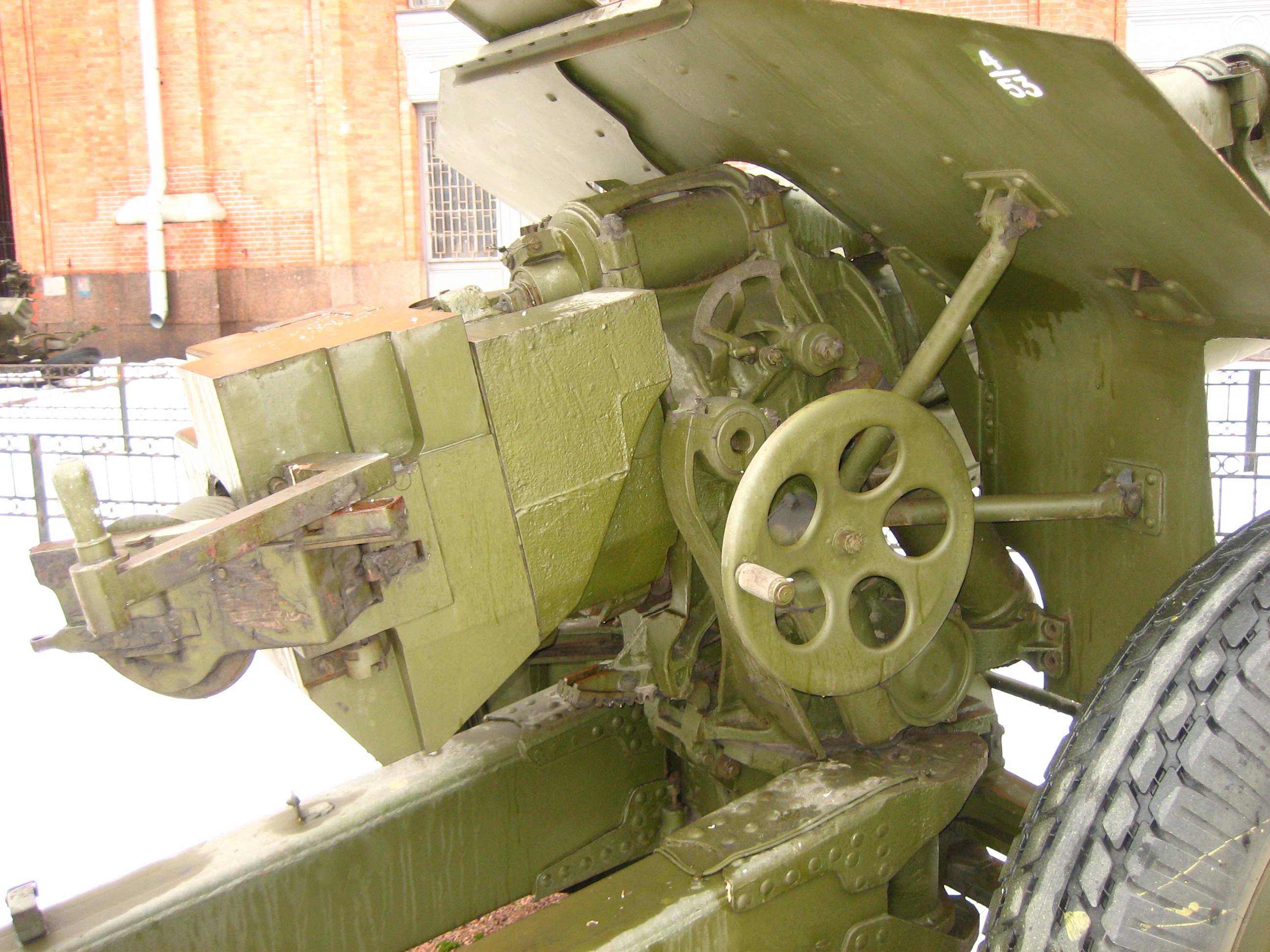
Right side of the breech

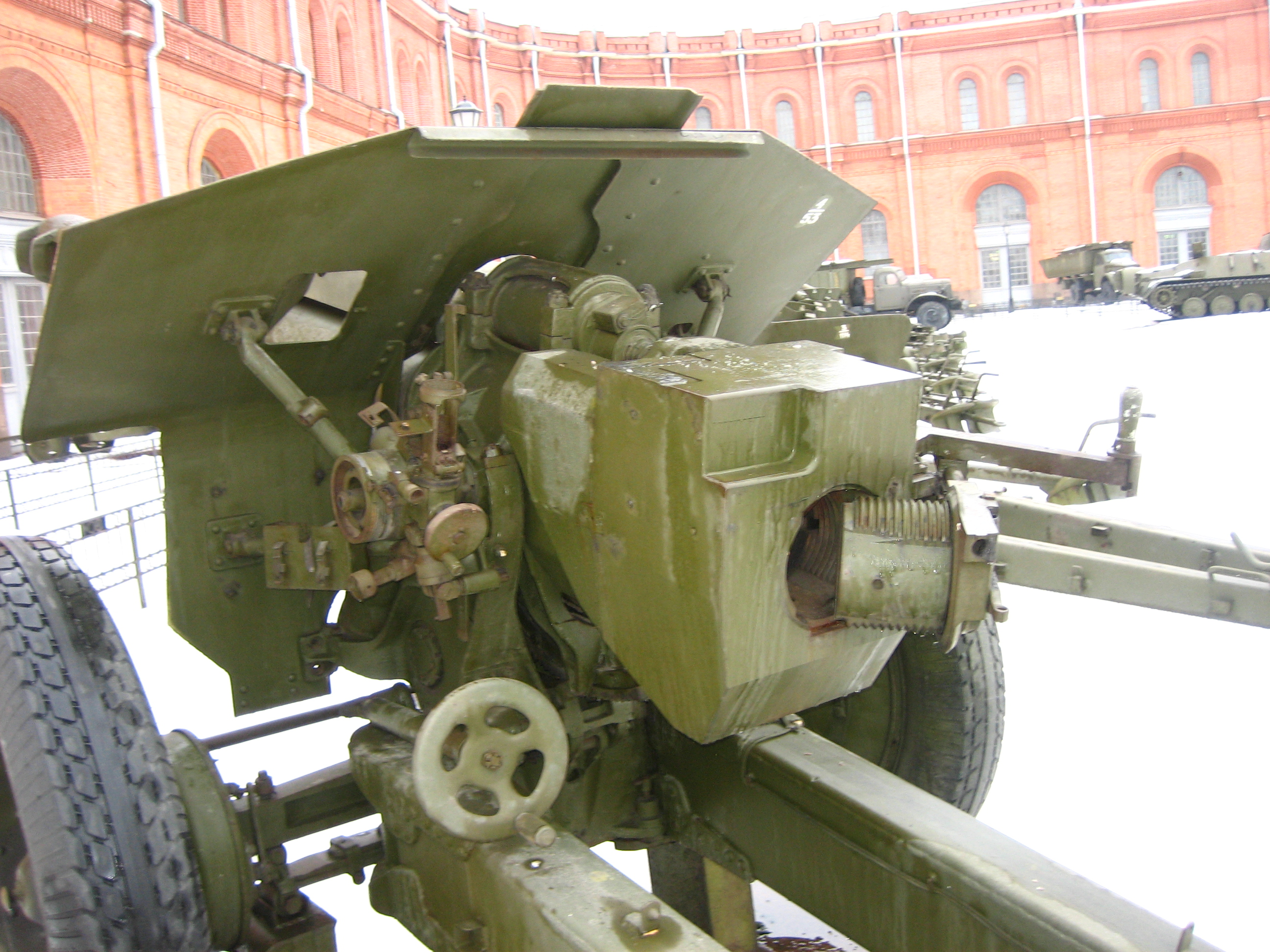
Left side of the breech with panoramic sight

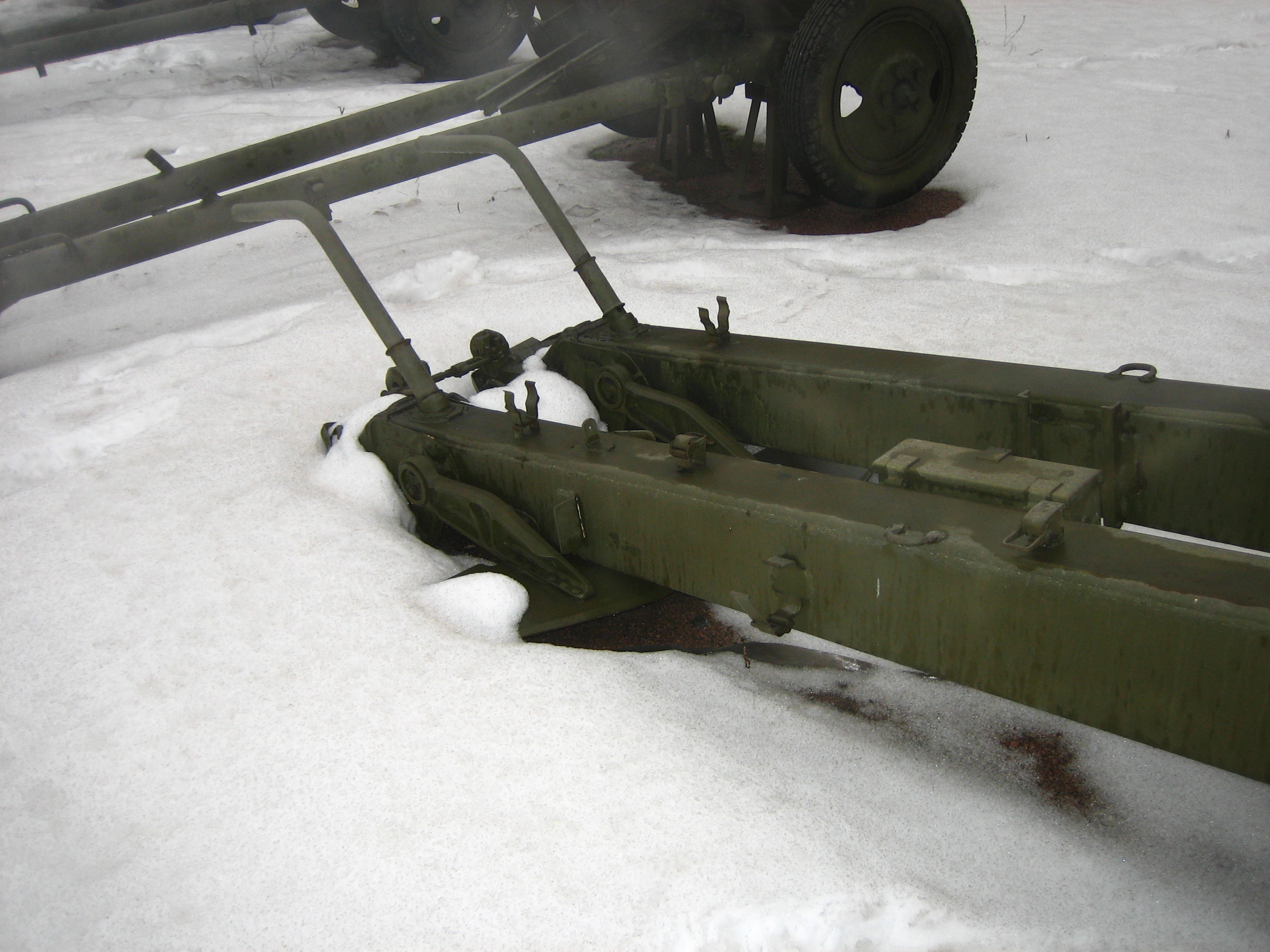
Trails of the carriage

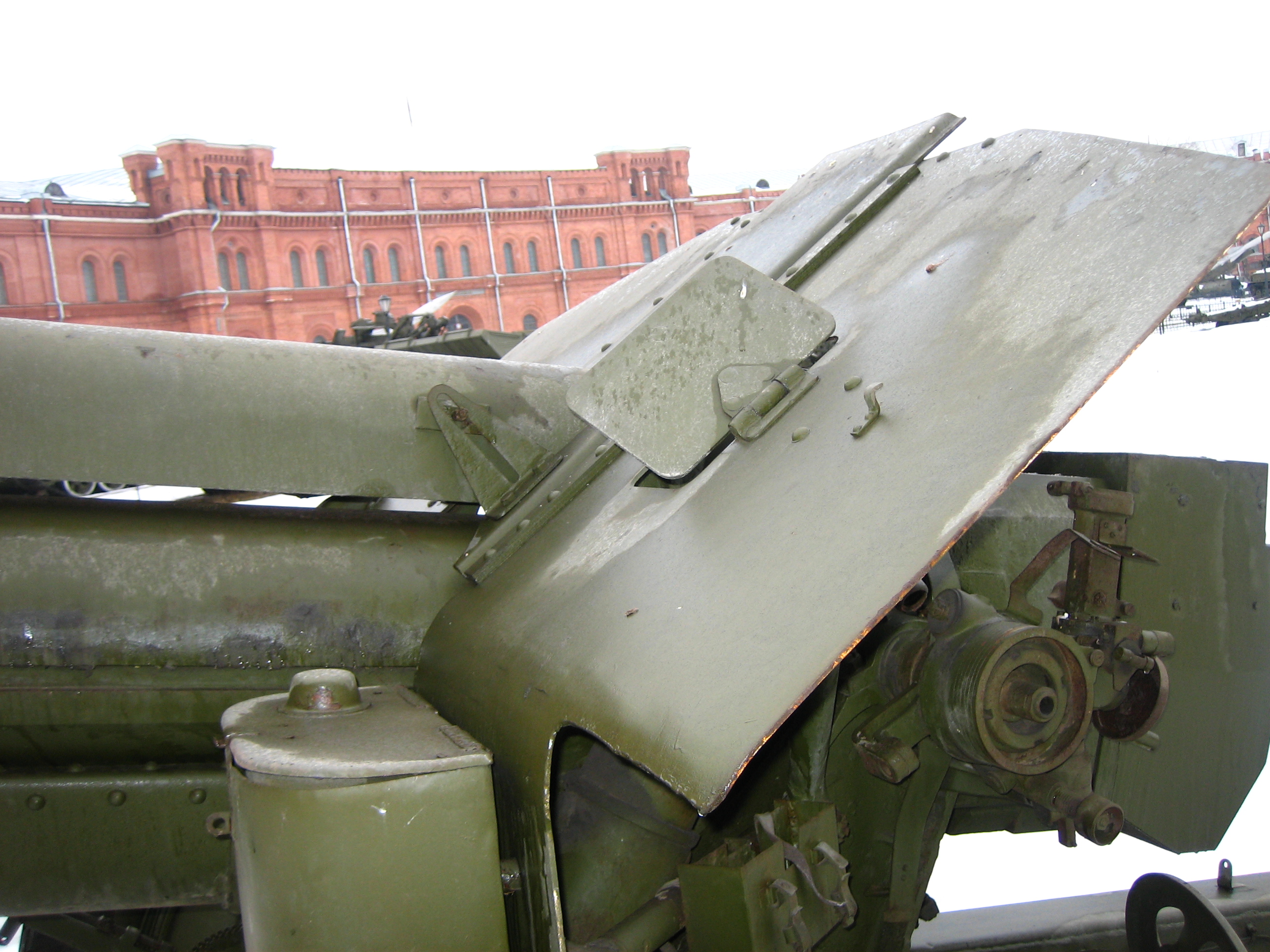
Gunshield

=== Comparison with contemporary howitzers ===
From a technical and tactical point of view, the D-1 project provided the Red Army (RKKA) corps artillery with a modern 152 mm howitzer, which combined both good mobility and firepower. When compared with a typical contemporary howitzer of similar caliber, the D-1 had shorter range, but was much lighter. For example, the German 15 cm sFH 18 had a range of 13,325 meters – about one kilometer longer than that of the D-1 – but also weighed almost two tons more (5,510 kilograms in traveling position). The same can be said of the US 155-mm howitzer M1 (14,600 meters, 5,800 kilograms) or the 149 mm howitzer manufactured by the Italian Ansaldo (14,250 meters, 5,500 kilograms). A German howitzer with characteristics similar to those of the D-1 – the 15 cm sFH 36 – did not reach mass production. Compared with older pieces such as the French Schneider model 1917 (11,200 meters, 4,300 kg), the D-1 had the advantage in both weight and range.

== Organization and employment ==
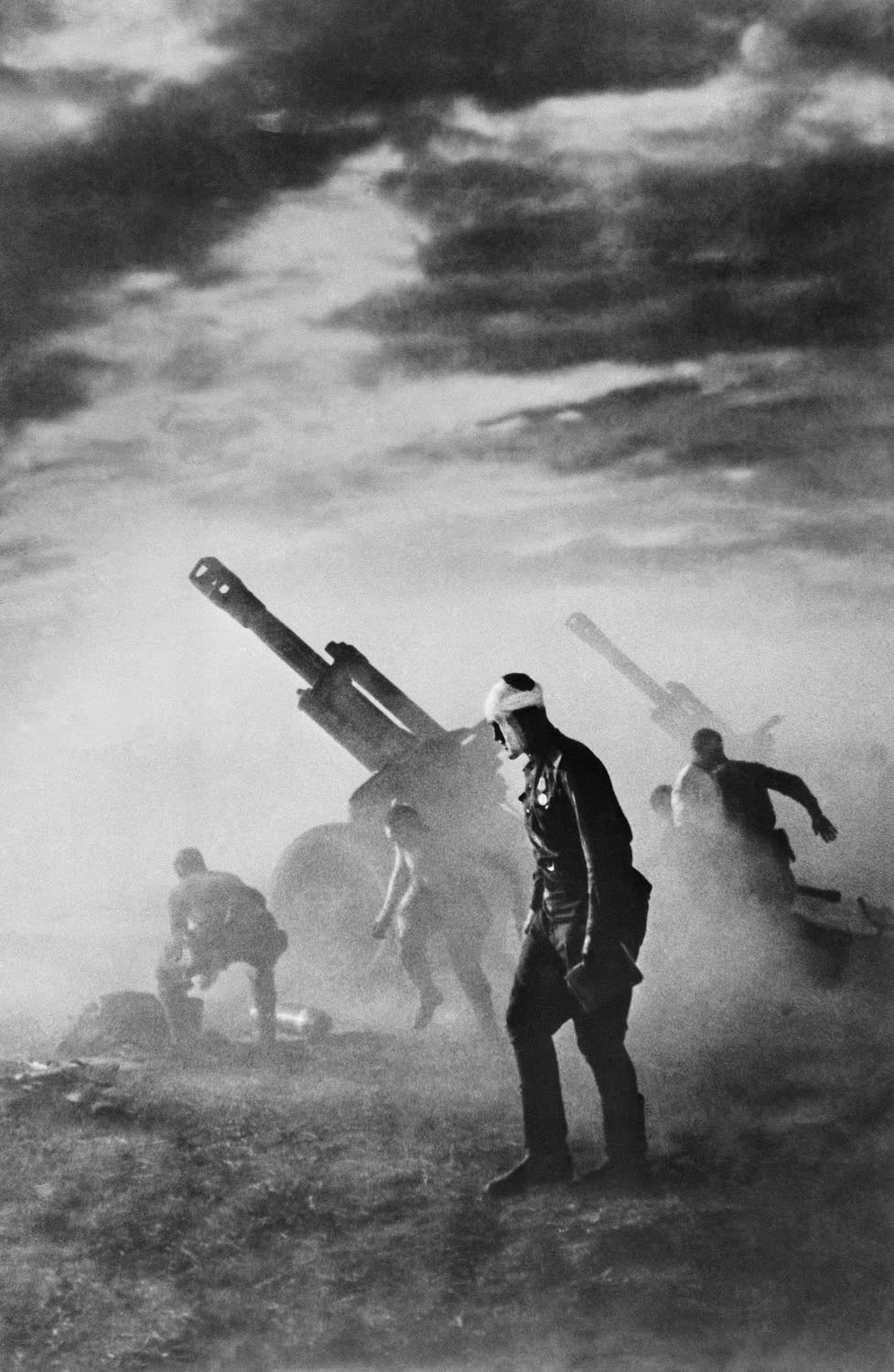
A battery of D-1s of the 49th Army in Belorussia, mid-1944

The D-1 was employed by corps artillery and the reserve of the main command units. In 1944, the rifle corps of the Red Army had one artillery regiment each. Those regiments consisted of five batteries (totaling 20 guns), equipped with the D-1 along with various other 152 mm howitzers, 122 mm gun M1931/37 (A-19), 152 mm howitzer-gun M1937 (ML-20) or 107 mm gun M1910/30. Reserve of the Main Command included howitzer regiments (48 pieces) and heavy howitzer brigades (32 pieces). Those could be merged to form artillery divisions.

The Red Army employed D-1 howitzers from 1944 onwards, during the final stages of World War II. The D-1 was used primarily used against personnel, fortifications and key structures in the enemy rear. The anti-concrete G-530 shell was also sometimes used against armored vehicles with good results. During its service the gun earned a reputation for being reliable and accurate. The D-1 was finally withdrawn from service in the mid-seventies.

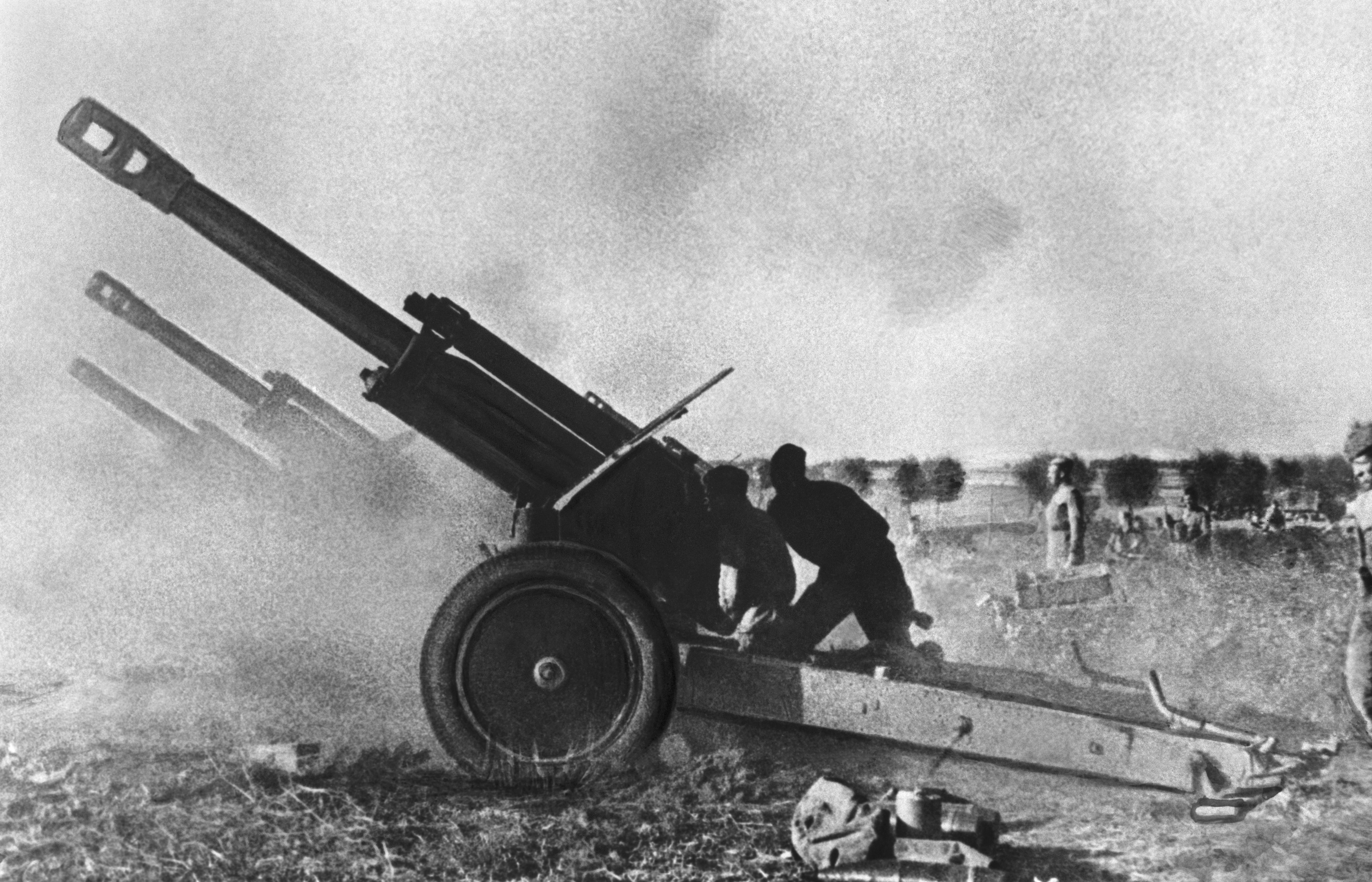
A battery of D-1s in East Prussia, late 1944

After the war the gun was supplied to many countries around the globe, including former Warsaw Pact allies, such as Poland. As of the early 2000s it remains in service in Afghanistan, Albania, China, Cuba, Hungary, Iraq, Mozambique, Syria, Vietnam and other countries. The gun was employed in the Arab-Israeli Conflict and also in some conflicts in former republics of Soviet Union. The long operational history of D-1 howitzers in the national armies of numerous countries is an additional testimony to its qualities.

The D-1 was seen in use during the April 2016 battles between the Nagorno-Karabakh Defense Army and the Azerbaijani Forces. It was used by the NKR Defense Forces. In the 2022 Russian invasion of Ukraine, D-1s were reportedly provided to the LPR People's Militia, DNR and Wagner PMCs.

In October 2023, at least one D-1 howitzer was being deployed by the DNR's 132nd Separate Guards Motor Rifle Brigade in Ukraine. The gun was being used to shell Ukrainian positions near Avdiivka.

Surviving D-1 howitzers can be seen in various military museums and war memorials, e. g. in the Museum of Artillery and Engineering Forces, Saint Petersburg, Russia; in the Museum of Heroic Defense and Liberation of Sevastopol on Sapun Mountain, Sevastopol and in the National Museum of the History of Ukraine in the Second World War, Kyiv, Ukraine; in Fort Winiary, Poznań, Poland and in Polatsk, Belarus, as a memorial piece.

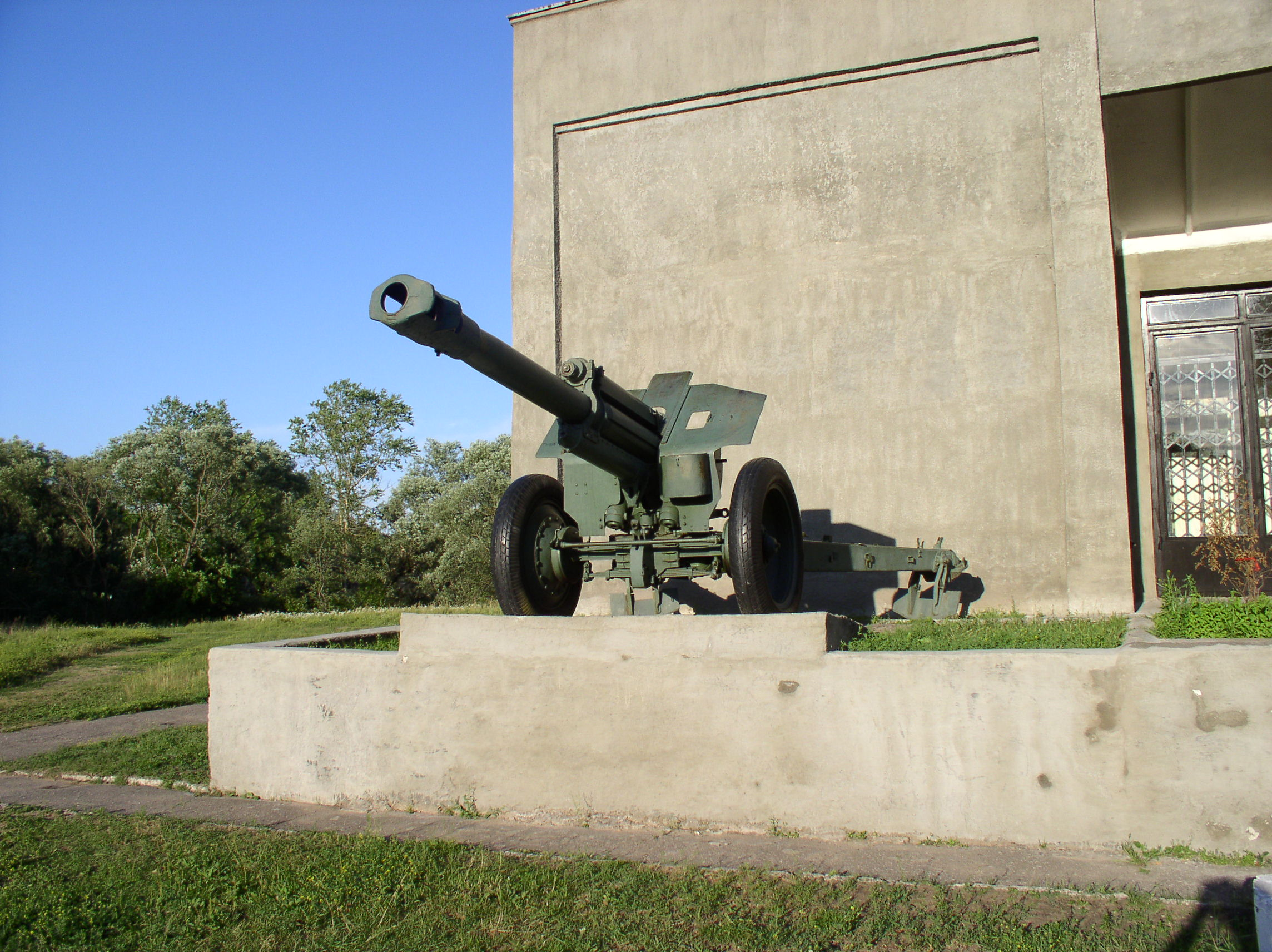
D-1 in Polatsk.

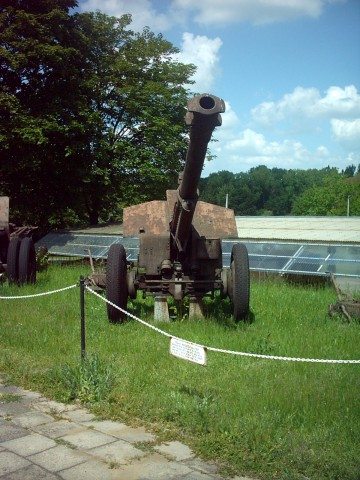
D-1 in Poznań citadel.

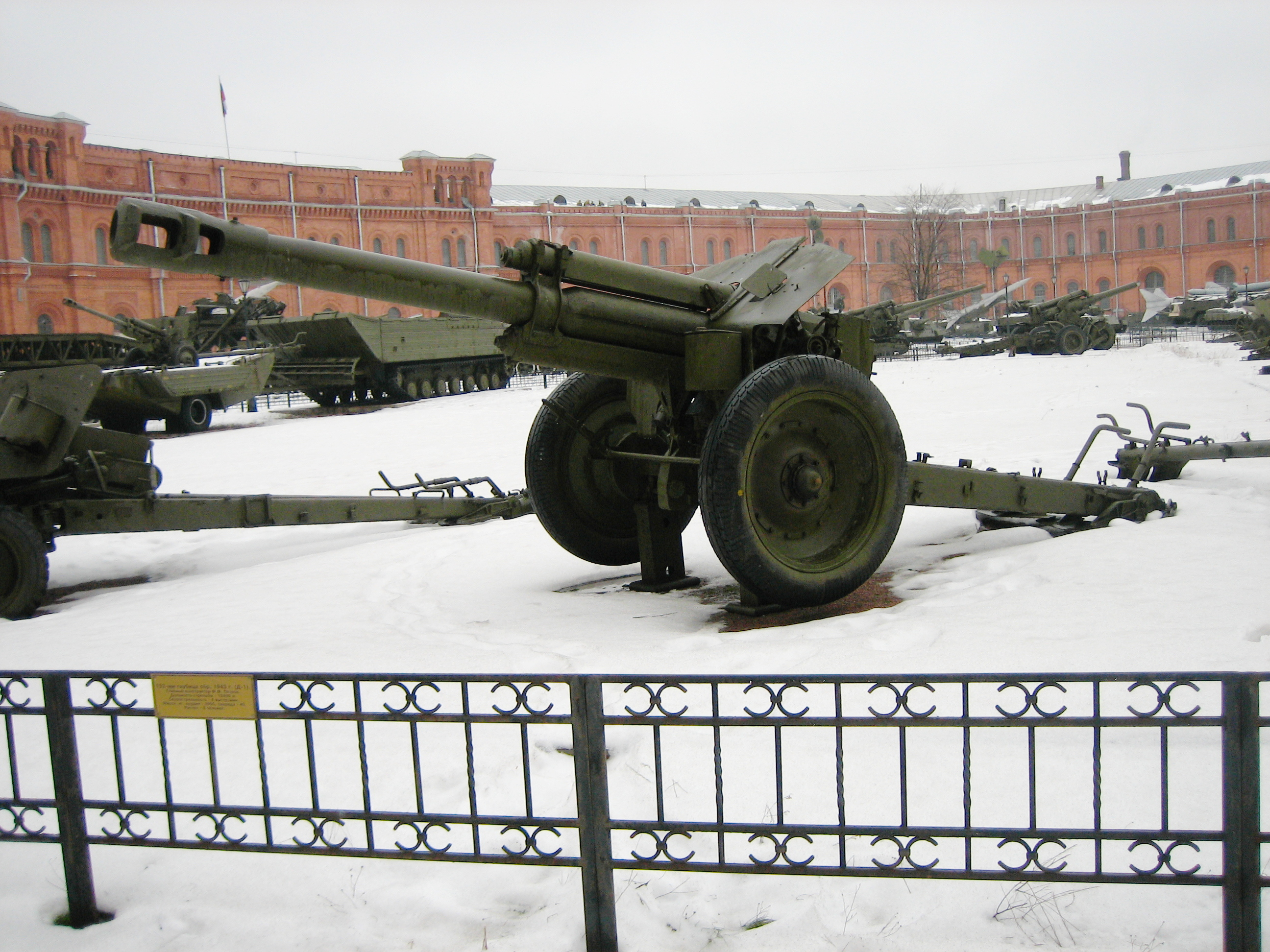
D-1 in the Museum of Artillery, Saint Petersburg.

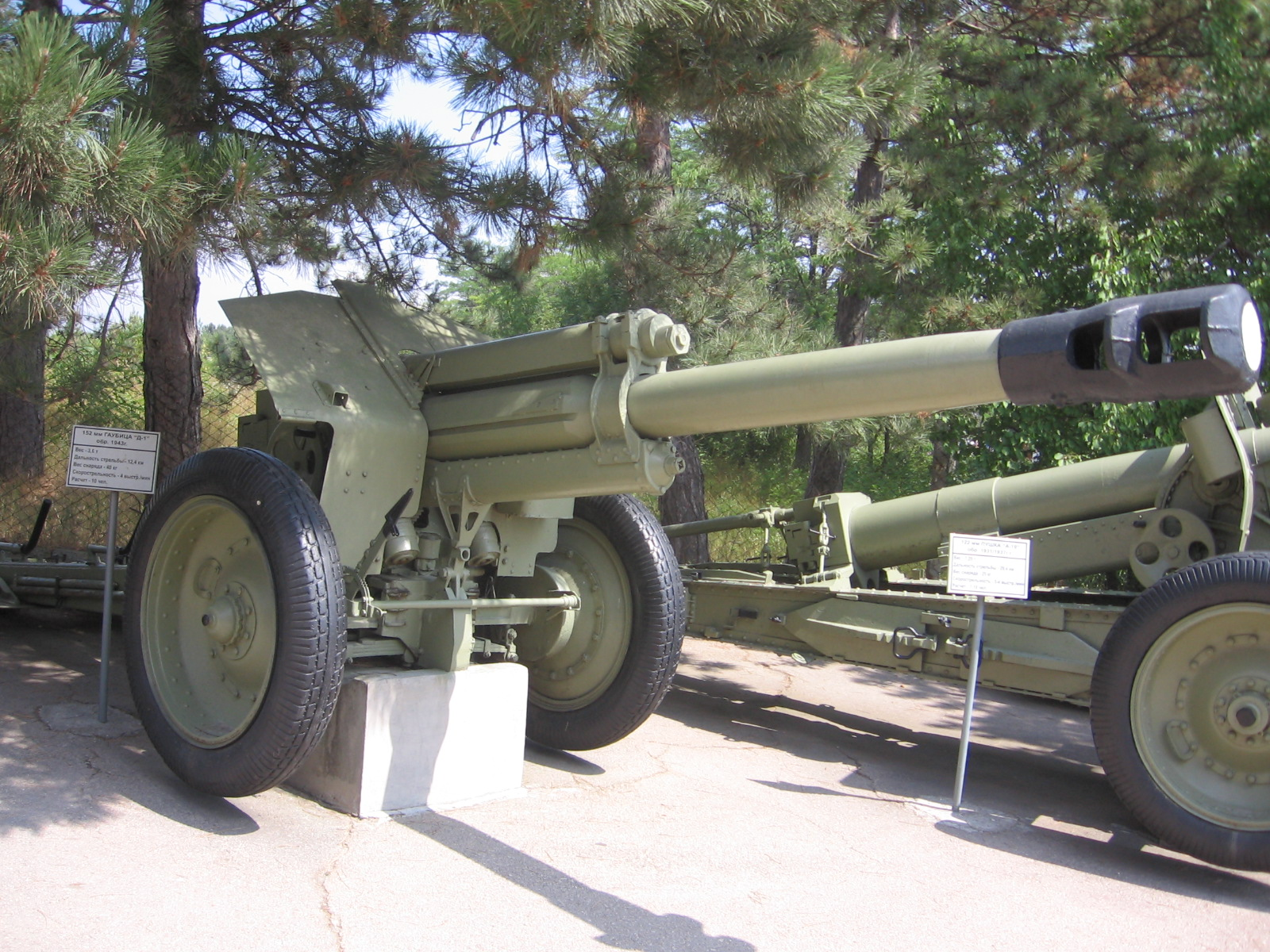
D-1 in the Museum on Sapun Mountain, Sevastopol

== Variants ==
In addition to the towed howitzer, Petrov's team developed a vehicle-mounted variant of the D-1. Red Army offensive operations in the summer and fall of 1943 reawakened interest in the idea of a heavy "artillery" tank similar to the KV-2, that could provide close fire support to rifle and tank units and would be capable of demolishing heavy fortifications. Probable causes for the development of such a vehicle were the cessation of mass production of the SU-122 medium assault gun and diversion of SU-152 heavy assault guns for anti-tank actions. The tank variant of the D-1 was originally intended for mounting in a variant of the KV-1s heavy tank. It utilized the mount of the 85 mm D-5, leading to the unofficial name D-1-5 and eventually to the official designation of D-15. Only one example was built. There is no information about the gun being mounted in the KV tank. By October 1943 Soviet authorities were anticipating the start of mass production of the powerful IS-2 heavy tank; as a result the idea of a specialized artillery tank based on the obsolete KV chassis was dropped.

Another project combining the T-34 tank chassis with the D-15 gun was also considered. Designated SU-D15, the medium assault gun was intended as a replacement for the SU-122. Although the project received a lot of support from the authorities it never entered production, both because of its shortcomings (the heavy gun put too much strain on the suspension and ammunition stowage was too limited) and because it was made redundant by the ISU-152. However lessons learned mounting a powerful gun in the T-34 allowed for rapid development of the SU-100 tank destroyer.

== Ammunition ==
1 – HE/Frag shell OF-530, 2 – fragmentary shell O-530, 3 – HEAC (anti-concrete) shell G-530.

The D-1 had a large variety of ammunition, including high-explosive, armor-piercing, HEAT, shrapnel, illumination, and chemical.

The D-1 used separate loading ammunition, with eight different charges. The charges included the "full charge" Zh-536 and smaller charges ranging from the "first" to "sixth", which was the smallest. A "special charge" was used with the BP-540 HEAT projectile. Propellant charges were produced in "full" and "third" variants in munitions factories. All other charges were derived from them by removing small gunpowder bags from the charge cartridge. For flash suppression there was a special chemical mixture which was to be inserted into a cartridge before night firing. 152 mm projectiles for the D-1 weighed about 40 kg; a difficult job for the loaders, who had to carry the projectiles alone.

When set to fragmentation mode, the OF-530 projectile produced fragments which covered an area 70 meters wide and 30 meters deep. When set to high-explosive (HE) action, the exploding shell produced a crater about 3.5 meters in diameter and about 1.2 meters deep. Despite the D-1's withdrawal from service in the mid- 1970s, the OF-530 is still fired from modern 152 mm ordnance pieces of the Russian Army.

The G-530 HEAC anti-concrete shell had a muzzle velocity of 457 m/s when fired with the "first" charge. At a range of one kilometer it had a 358 m/s terminal velocity and was able to punch through up to 80 centimeters of reinforced concrete before detonating a TNT charge which increased the total penetration to 114 centimeters. The G-530 could not be fired with a "full" charge without putting the crew at risk of having the shell explode in the barrel. A special version of the shell, the G-530Sh, was developed to allow use with the full charge.

The BP-540 HEAT projectile was not used during World War II. It had an armour penetration of 250 millimeters at an incident angle of 90°, 220 millimeters at 60°, 120 millimeters at 30°.

In the late 1950s old ammunition stocks for the D-1 were removed from the Soviet inventory. The only shells retained were the OF-530, O-530, G-530/G-530Sh, and possibly chemical shells. The Soviet Army also possessed a 152 mm nuclear shell, but it is not clear whether that shell could be used with the D-1.

Available ammunition
Type	Model	Weight	Filler weight	Muzzle velocity	Range
Armor-piercing shells
Naval semi-AP	Model 1915/28 (PB-35)	51.07 kg (112.6 lb)	3.2 kg (7.1 lb)
HEAT	BP-540	27.44 kg (60.5 lb)		560 m/s (1,800 ft/s)	3,000 m (3,300 yd)
Anti-concrete shells
Anti-concrete shell	G-530 / G-530Sh	40.0 kg (88.2 lb)	5.1 kg (11 lb)	508 m/s (1,670 ft/s)	12,400 m (13,600 yd)
High-explosive and fragmentation shells
HE-Fragmentation, steel	OF-530	40.0 kg (88.2 lb)	5.47–6.86 kg (12.1–15.1 lb)	508 m/s (1,670 ft/s)	12,400 m (13,600 yd)
HE-Fragmentation, steely iron	OF-530A	40.0 kg (88.2 lb)	5.66 kg (12.5 lb)
HE, old	F-533	40.41 kg (89.1 lb)	8.0 kg (17.6 lb)
HE, old	F-533K	40.68 kg (89.7 lb)	7.3 kg (16 lb)
HE, old	F-533N	41.0 kg (90.4 lb)	7.3 kg (16 lb)
HE, old	F-533U	40.8 kg (90 lb)	8.8 kg (19 lb)
HE, steely iron, old, French	F-534F	41.1 kg (91 lb)	3.9 kg (8.6 lb)
HE, for 152-mm mortar model 1931	F-521	41.7 kg (92 lb)	7.7 kg (17 lb)
HE, British, for Vickers 152-mm howitzer	F-531	44.91 kg (99.0 lb)	5.7 kg (13 lb)
Shrapnel shells
Shrapnel with 45 sec. tube	Sh-501	41.16–41.83 kg (90.7–92.2 lb)	0.5 kg (1.1 lb) (680–690 bullets)
Shrapnel with Т-6 tube	Sh-501T	41.16 kg (90.7 lb)	0.5 kg (1.1 lb) (680–690 bullets)
Illumination shells
Illumination, 40 sec.	S 1	40.2 kg (89 lb)
Chemical shells
Chemical howitzer shell	HS-530	38.8 kg (86 lb)
Chemical howitzer shell	HN-530	39.1 kg (86 lb)
Chemical (post-war)	ZHZ

== Operators ==
A few countries still have the D-1 in reserve units or deep storage.

- Armenia — 2
- China — Some/all reverse-engineered copies.
- Cuba
- Donetsk People's Republic
- Kyrgyzstan — 16
- Mozambique — 12
- Russia — 500+
- Rwanda — 29: Some/all Chinese-built copies.
- Turkmenistan — 17

=== Former operators ===
- Artsakh
- Soviet Union
- East Germany
- People's Socialist Republic of Albania

== Sources ==
- Shunkov V. N. – The Weapons of the Red Army, Mn. Harvest, 1999 (Шунков В. Н. – Оружие Красной Армии. – Мн.: Харвест, 1999.) ISBN 985-433-469-4
- Shirokorad A. B. – Encyclopedia of the Soviet Artillery – Mn. Harvest, 2000 (Широкорад А. Б. Энциклопедия отечественной артиллерии. – Мн.: Харвест, 2000., ISBN 985-433-703-0)
- Ivanov A. – Artillery of the USSR in Second World War – SPb Neva, 2003 (Иванов А. Артиллерия СССР во Второй Мировой войне. – СПб., Издательский дом Нева, 2003., ISBN 5-7654-2731-6)
- Ballistic Tables for the 152-mm Howitzer M1943, M. MoD, 1968 – Таблицы стрельбы 152-мм гаубицы обр. 1943 г. – М., Военное издательство министерства обороны, 1968.
- Zheltov I. G., Pavlov I. V., Pavlov M. V., Solyankin A. G. – The Soviet medium self-propelled guns 1941–1945, Moscow, 2005, 48 pp. (Желтов И. Г., Павлов И. В., Павлов М. В., Солянкин А. Г. Советские средние самоходные артиллерийские установки 1941–1945 гг. – М.: ООО Издательский центр «Экспринт», 2005. – 48 с. ISBN 5-94038-079-4)
- Kolomietz M. V. – KV. "Klim Voroshilov" breakthrough tank, Moscow, 2006, 136 pp. (Коломиец М. В. КВ. «Клим Ворошилов» – танк прорыва – М.: Коллекция, Яуза, ЭКСМО, 2006. – 136 с.:ил. ISBN 5-699-18754-5)
- Shirokorad A. B. – The Nuclear Ram of 20th century, Moscow, 2005 (Широкорад А. Б. Атомный таран XX века – М. Вече, 2005)
