= XM 5 =

XM 5 may refer to:

- XM-5, a satellite operated by XM satellite radio
- XM 5, a radio channel from Sirus XM satellite radio; see List of Sirius XM Radio channels
- XM5, former name for the U.S. Army M7 assault rifle

== See also ==
- XMS (disambiguation)
- XMV (disambiguation)
- XM (disambiguation)
