= XMM =

XMM may refer to:

- XMM-Newton (X-ray Multi-Mirror Mission), a space telescope
- XMM, registers of x86 microprocessors with Streaming SIMD Extensions
- Extended memory manager, in the Extended Memory Specification
- Intel XMM modems, in mobile devices

== See also ==
- XM2 (disambiguation)
- XM (disambiguation)
