= XM2 =

XM2 may refer to:

- XM-2 Roll, a satellite for XM satellite radio
- XMX (XM) (a.k.a. XM2), a satellite radio channel for XM satellite radio
- Canon XM2, a camcorder
- Citroën XM 2.0, a French automobile
- South African type XM2 tender, a steam locomotive tender
- Moller XM-2, a VTOL aircraft; see List of aircraft (Mo)
- XM2, a prototype version of the Bradley Fighting Vehicle
- XM-2, a U.S. Army Vietnam War era sensor
- XM-2, a U.S. X-ray microscope for soft X-ray microscopy, the first such for biological samples
- XMII (a.k.a. XM 2), 2005 album by Porcupine Tree

== See also ==
- RTÉ 2XM, Irish radio station
- XM2go, a portable XM satellite radio receiver
- XM (disambiguation)
- XMM (disambiguation)
- XMZ (disambiguation)
