= M10 motorway =

M10 motorway may refer to:

- M10 motorway (Great Britain), a former road in Hertfordshire, England
- Karachi Northern Bypass, also known as the M10 motorway, a road in Pakistan
- M10 highway (Russia), a road connecting Moscow and St. Petersburg

== See also ==
- List of highways numbered 10
- M10 (disambiguation)
