= XMV =

XMV may refer to:

- Malagasy language (ISO 639 language code xmv)
- Vox Novus XMV (eXperimental Music Video), a single-night music video festival in New York City hosted by Vox Novus
- iShares MSCI Canada Minimum Volatility Index (stock ticker XMV), an ETF from Blackrock; see List of Canadian exchange-traded funds

== See also ==
- XM 5 (disambiguation)
