= XMZ =

XMZ may refer to:

- Mori Bawah language (ISO 639 language code: xmz)
- XMZ, a concept car version of the Daihatsu Copen convertible kei car
- .XMZ, a file extension used by FastTracker 2
- "XMZ" (Xenofobní Misanthropickou Zrůdu), a 2014 song by 'Master's Hammer' off the album Vagus Vetus

== See also ==
- XM2 (disambiguation)
