= XMS =

XMS may refer to:

- Cray XMS, a vector processor minisupercomputer
- eBuddy XMS, instant-messaging service
- ISO 639:xms, Moroccan Sign Language
- Macas Airport (IATA: XMS), Ecuador
- XMS Capital Partners, a global financial services firm
- eXtended Memory Specification, an application programming interface for storing data in extended memory on IBM PC systems
- XMS, an API offered by IBM WebSphere MQ

== See also ==
- XM 5 (disambiguation)
- XM (disambiguation)
