= MX =

MX, Mx, mX, or mx may refer to:

== Arts, entertainment, and media ==
- MX (band), a Brazilian thrash metal band
- Monsta X, occasionally shortened to "MX"
- mX (newspaper), a former Australian newspaper
- "MX", a song by Deftones on the album Around the Fur
- MX (album), a 1993 album by David Murray
- Mylo Xyloto, a 2011 album by Coldplay
- MX Player, an Indian video-on-demand platform
- MX (series), a trilogy of motocross racing video games
- Tokyo MX, a television station based in Tokyo, Japan

== Businesses and organizations ==
- MX, IATA code of Breeze Airways (2021–present)
- MX, then IATA code of Mexicana de Aviación (1921–2010)
- Montreal Exchange, a stock exchange
- Moon Express, an American spaceflight company

== Science and technology ==
=== Computing and the Internet ===
- .mx, the Internet top-level domain of Mexico
- Macromedia Studio MX, a web content software program
- Maximum mode, a processor hardware mode
- MX Linux, a computer operating system
- MX record, an Internet data element used for routing email
- Mail exchange, a software application responsible for transferring email
- OpenMx, a structural equation modeling software application
- WinMX, a file sharing program
- Juniper MX-Series, a family of Ethernet routers and switches
- Java Management Extensions, abbreviated JMX or MX

=== Weapons ===
- MX designations, used for a series of weapons by the United States military
- LGM-118 Peacekeeper, a missile originally known as the MX for "Missile, Experimental"

=== Other uses in science and technology ===
- Maxwell (unit), measuring magnetic flux
- Murexide, an ammonium compound
- Mutagen X, an organochloride
- MX, a designation for letter beacons, a type of radio transmission
- Mx, shorthand for maintenance activities, typically in aviation context
- Cherry MX switches for mechanical keyboards
- Meizu MX series, a series of smartphones

== Other uses ==
- MX, Roman numeral for the number 1010
- Mexico (ISO 3166 country code MX)
- Motocross, a sport
- Malcolm X (1925–1965), African-American civil rights activist
- Mx., a gender-neutral honorific

== See also ==
- XM (disambiguation)
- Model X (disambiguation)
- M10 (disambiguation)
