= Model X =

Model X or X-model or variant may refer to:

== Vehicles ==
- Tesla Model X, mid-size all-electric luxury sports activity coupé (SAC)
- Matchless Model X, motorcycle
- BMW X Models
- Duesenberg Model X

== In fiction ==
- Biometal Model X, fictional metal from Mega Man ZX

== See also ==
- Smith & Wesson Model 10
- MAC-10
- X (disambiguation)
- MX (disambiguation)
- Model 10 (disambiguation)
