= M1910 =

M1910 may refer to:

- FN Browning M1910 pistol
- Glisenti Model 1910 pistol
- PM M1910, Russian machine gun
- 122 mm howitzer M1910/30, Russian artillery piece
- 152 mm howitzer M1910, Russian artillery piece
  - 152 mm howitzer M1910/37, Russian artillery piece
- 152 mm siege gun M1910, Russian artillery piece
  - 152 mm gun M1910/34, Russian artillery piece
  - 152 mm gun M1910/30, Russian artillery piece
- 107 mm gun M1910, Russian artillery piece
  - 107 mm gun M1910/30, Russian artillery piece
- 14-inch gun M1910, US Army artillery piece

== See also ==
- M10 (disambiguation)
