= 152 mm howitzer M1938 (M-10) =

152-mm howitzer M1938 (M-10)
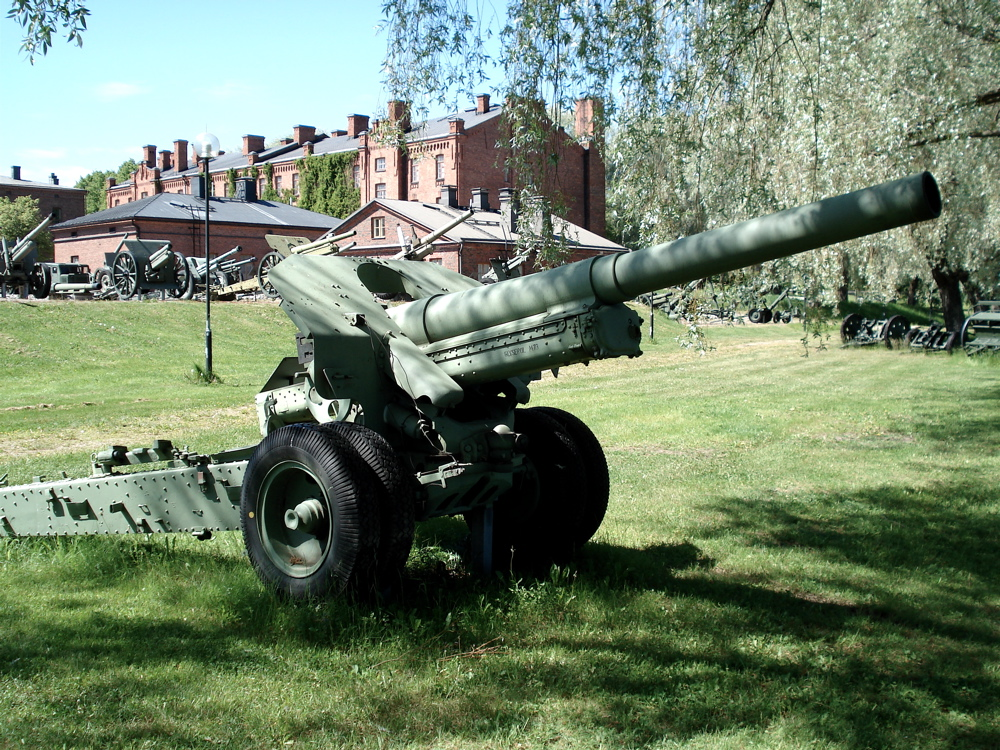
- M-10 in Hämeenlinna artillery museum, Finland
- Type: Howitzer
- Place of origin: USSR

Production history
- Manufacturer: Plant no. 172
- Produced: 1939–1941
- No. built: 1,522

Specifications
- Mass: combat: 4,150 kg (9,049 lbs) travel: 4,550 kg (10,031 lbs)
- Length: bore: 3.527 m (11 ft 6.9 in) L/23 overall: 3.7 m (12 ft 2 in) L/24.3
- Crew: 10
- Shell: Separate loading bagged charges and projectiles
- Shell weight: 51.5 kg (114 lb)
- Caliber: 152.4 mm (6 in)
- Breech: interrupted screw
- Recoil: Hydro-pneumatic
- Carriage: Split trail
- Elevation: −1° to 65°
- Traverse: 50°
- Rate of fire: 3–4 rounds per minute
- Muzzle velocity: 432–508 m/s (1,420–1,670 ft/s)
- Maximum firing range: 12.4 km (7.7 mi)
- Sights: panoramic

152-mm howitzer M1938 (M-10) (Russian: 152-мм гаубица обр. 1938 г. (М-10)) was a Soviet 152.4 mm (6 inch) howitzer of World War II era. It was developed in 1937–1938 at the Motovilikha Mechanical Plant by a team headed by F. F. Petrov, and produced until 1941. It saw combat with the Red Army until the end of World War II and remained in service until the 1950s. Captured pieces were used by Wehrmacht and the Finnish Army. The latter kept the M-10 in service until 2000.

In a tank-mounted variant, M-10T, the gun was mounted on the KV-2 heavy tank.

== Development history ==
By the early 1930s the Red Army (RKKA) started to look for a replacement for the 152-mm howitzer M1909 and the 152-mm howitzer M1910. Those pieces, developed before World War I, had unsprung fixed trail carriages and short barrels, which meant poor mobility, insufficient elevation and traverse angles and short range. Although both pieces were eventually modernized, resulting in the 152-mm howitzer M1909/30 and the 152-mm howitzer M1910/37 respectively, these were relatively minor upgrades which brought only limited improvement in some areas and didn't address others. It was clear that a completely new design was needed.

At that time, the Soviets had little experience in developing modern artillery pieces. An initial attempt was made to overcome that issue through a collaboration with Germany. Constrained by the limitations of the Treaty of Versailles, Germany was looking for ways to proceed with weapons development and joint projects gave them such an opportunity. Among other weapons supplied by Germans was a heavy howitzer, designated 152-mm howitzer M1931 (NG) in the USSR. Soon the Motovilikha Mechanical Plant (MMZ) was tasked with the production of this gun. After only eight pieces had been completed in 1932–1934, production was stopped, as the design had proven to be too complicated for the Soviet industry of the early 1930s, similar to other designs like 122-mm howitzer M1934 or 20-mm and 37-mm autocannons. Also it was considered somewhat heavy at 5,445 kg in travelling configuration. But these early failures gave Soviet developers some valuable experience.

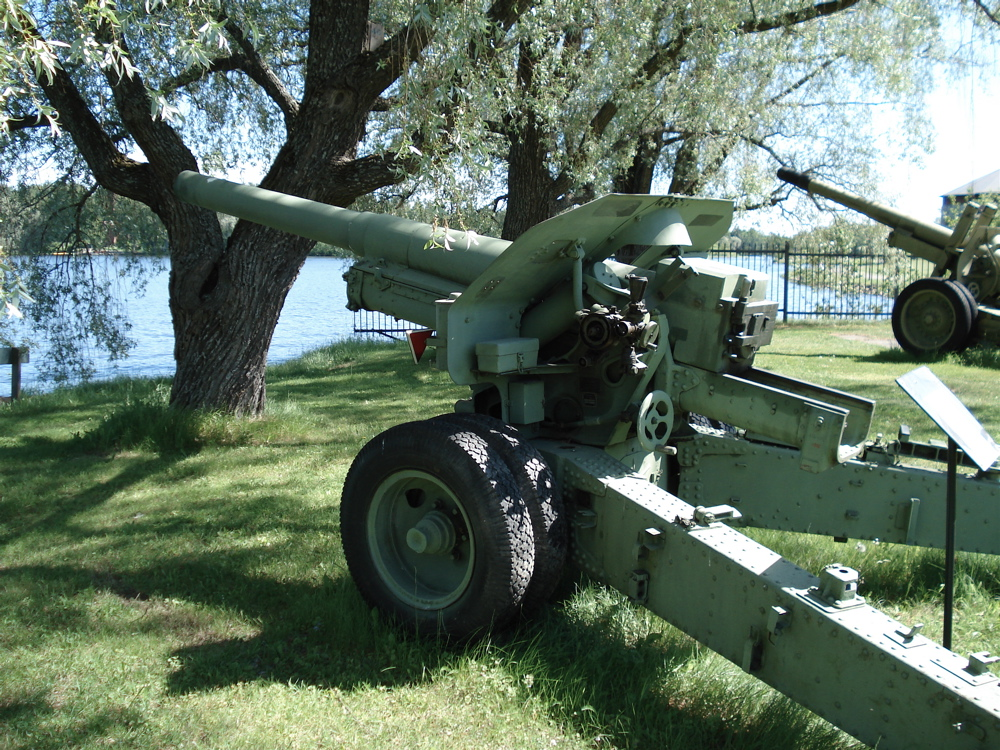
M-10 in Hämeenlinna artillery museum, Finland.

In 1937, F. F. Petrov and his design team at the Plant No.172 (another name for Motovilikha Plant) started work on a new design, the M-10. Technical papers were submitted to the Artillery Directorate on 1 August 1937 and on 2 November the first prototype was completed. Ground trials (19–25 October 1938) featured two pieces: No. 302 (L/25 barrel with constant rifling) and No. 303 (L/20 barrel with progressive rifling). The No. 303 was found to be superior. The trials also revealed numerous defects in the gun construction: the howitzer suffered from insufficient upper carriage strength, leaks in the recoil buffer, unreliable suspension etc. For army tests early in 1939, an improved design with a longer barrel was presented. Another series of army tests followed from 22 December 1939 to 10 January 1940, but even before it started—on 29 September 1939—the gun was adopted as 152 mm divisional howitzer model 1938. Later, the word divisional was removed from the designation.

== Production history ==
The M-10 entered production at the Plant No. 172 in 1939. Until the end of the year, four pieces were manufactured, 685 more in 1940 and 833 in 1941. About 340 barrels for KV-2 heavy tanks were also built (for 334 serial production tanks and a few prototypes and experimental vehicles).

Soon after the outbreak of the war, mass production of the gun was halted. The following reasons are typically cited:.

- The M-10 was considered too heavy for divisional artillery and not powerful enough for corps artillery;
- Problems with manufacturing process;
- Lack of requirement for this type of weapon during the defensive phase of the war.

Some found these arguments questionable. Later in the war, corps artillery employed the 152-mm howitzer M1943 (D-1) with the same ballistics. Production rates were growing. Even early in the war, the Red Army wasn't passive, but tried to attack at every opportunity; moreover, howitzers are certainly useful in defensive combat too, e.g. for suppressing enemy howitzers. A historian M. Svirin offered the next explanation instead:

- Shortage in powerful artillery tractors;
- Problems with maintenance and repair;
- Complexity and steel intensity of the carriage;
- Soviet ordnance plants either were lost or were busy producing other equipment that had higher priority.

== Description ==
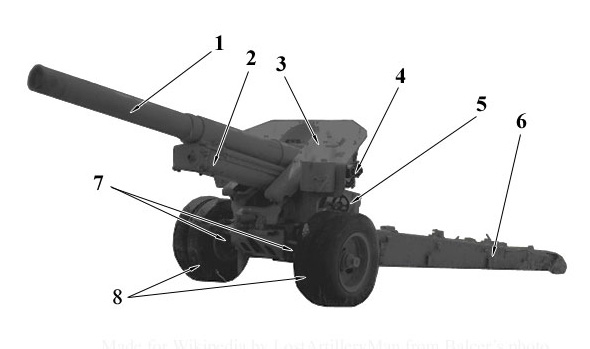
Components of M-10 howitzer: 1 — barrel 2 — recoil devices 3 — gunshield 4 — panoramic sight 5 — breech 6 — split trails 7 — suspension 8 — wheels.

The M-10 was much more advanced design compared to older Soviet 152 mm howitzers. It had a modern split trail carriage which allowed for a much larger traverse. The trails were of riveted construction. The carriage was equipped with suspension and wheels from the ZiS-5, increasing towing speed.

The barrel, much longer than that of older designs, was fitted with an interrupted screw breechblock with recoil devices consisting of a hydraulic recoil buffer and hydro-pneumatic recuperator. The recoil travel was variable. A gun shield provided some protection from bullets and shell fragments.

Unlike its eventual successor, the D-1, the M-10 was not equipped with a muzzle brake. While softening recoil and thus allowing for a lighter carriage, a muzzle brake has the disadvantage of redirecting some of the gases that escape the barrel toward the ground where they raise dust, revealing the gun position.

The gun could be towed by an artillery tractor or a team of horses. In the latter case, a 400-kg limber was used.

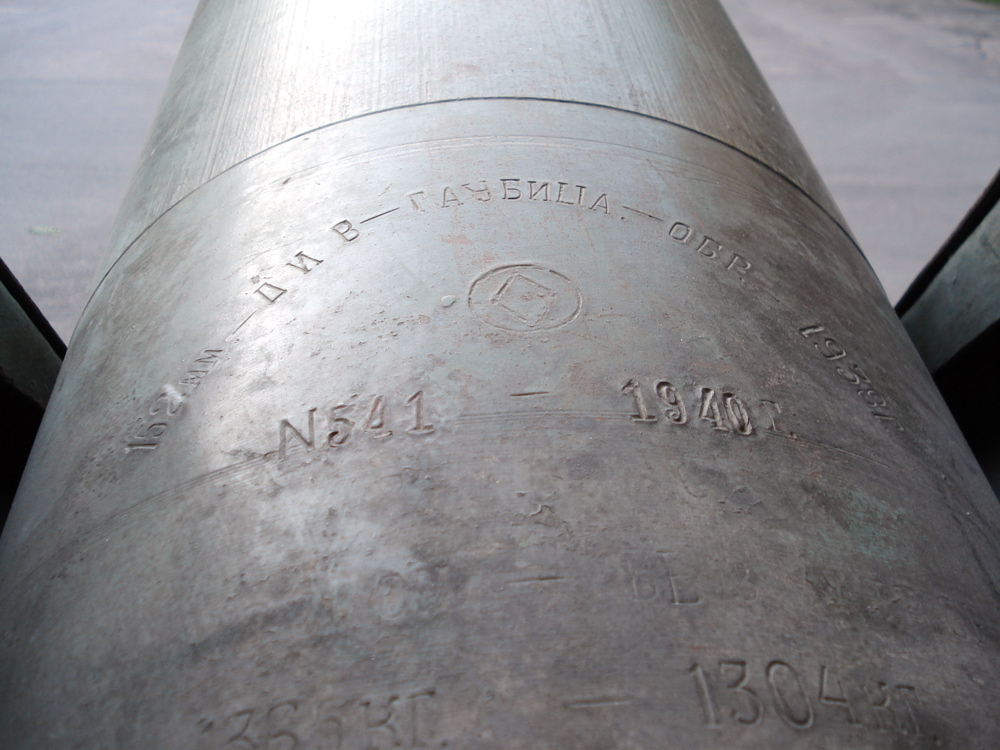
Factory marks on the barrel

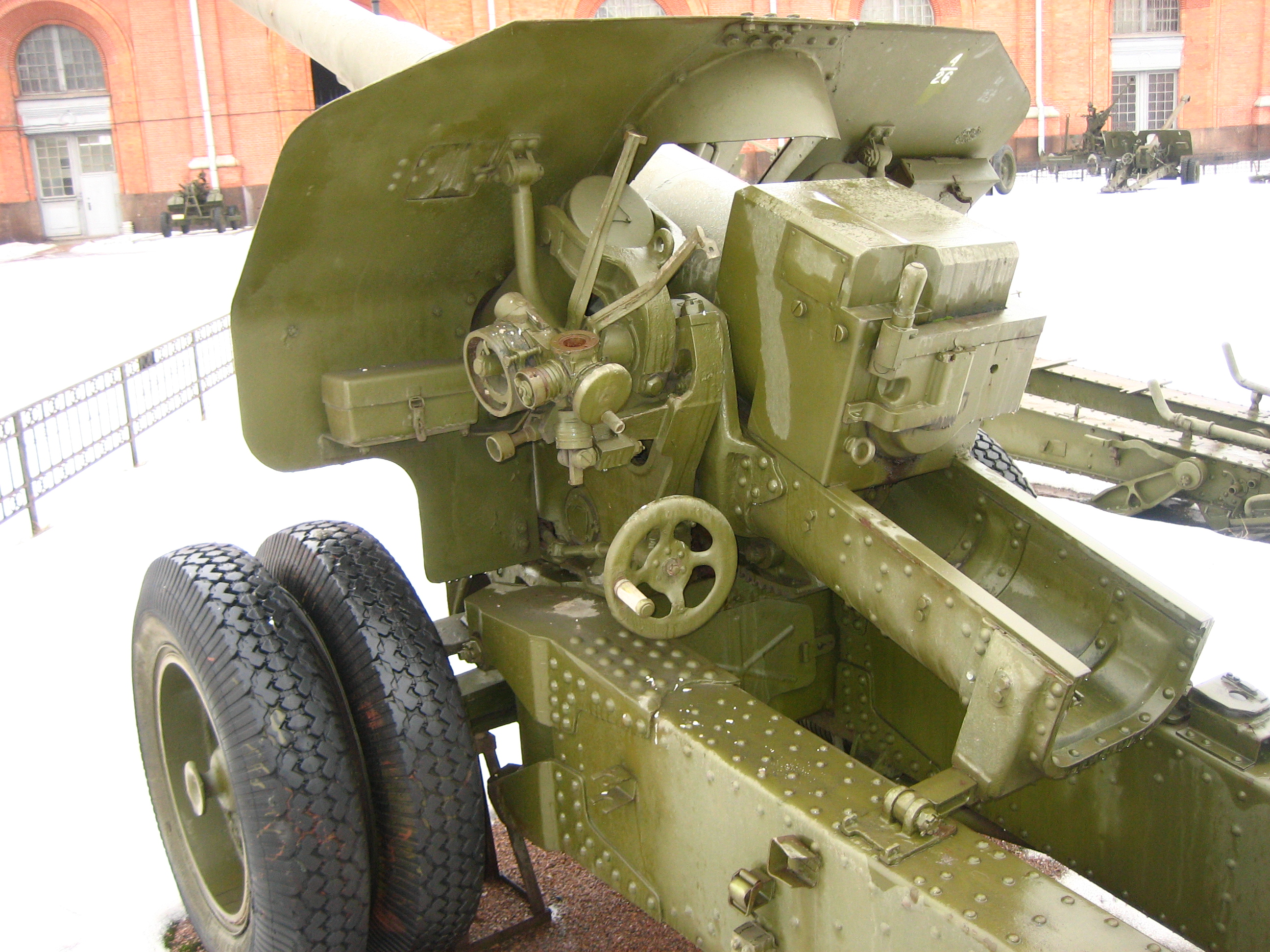
Breech, left side

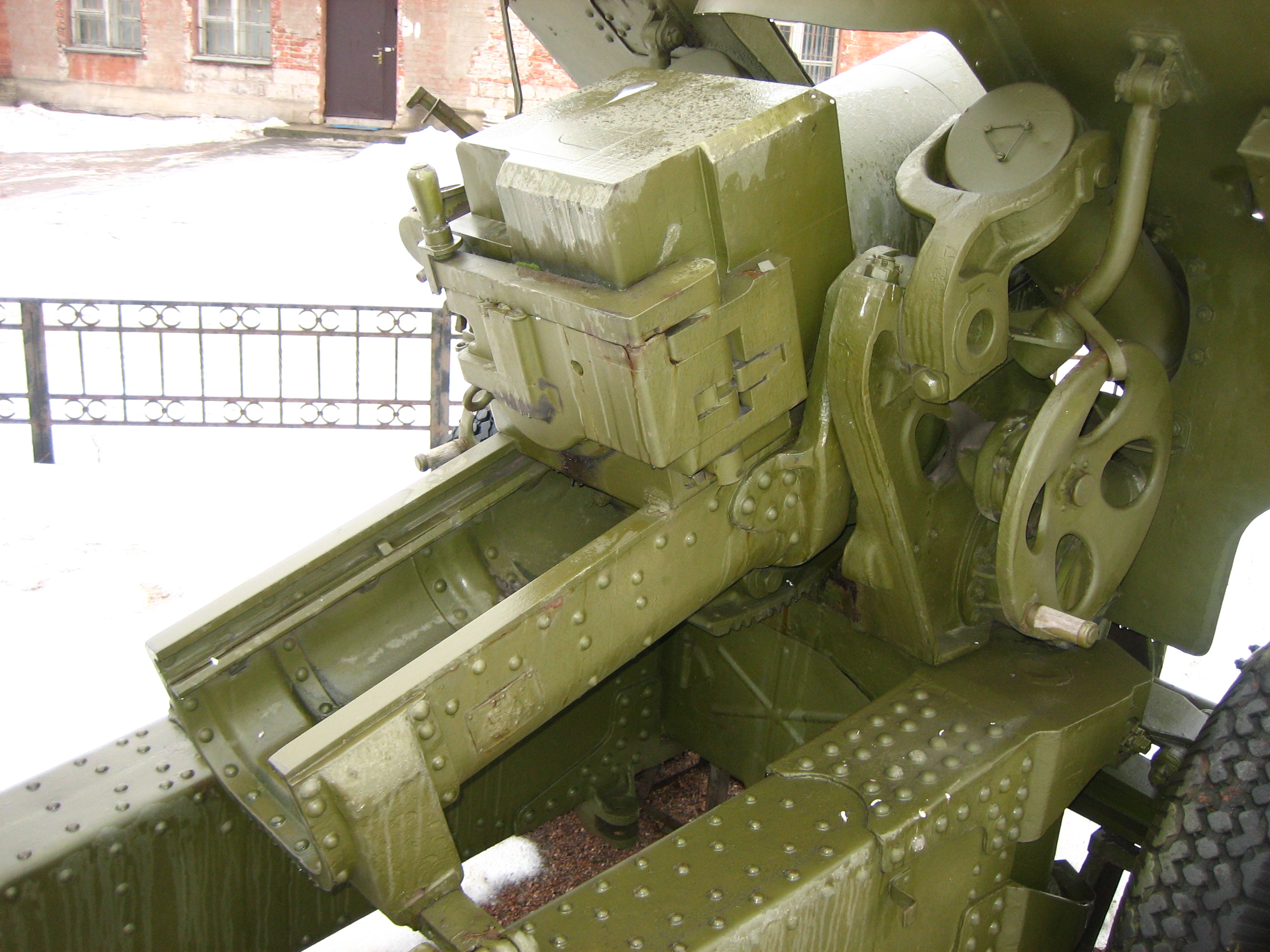
Breech, right side

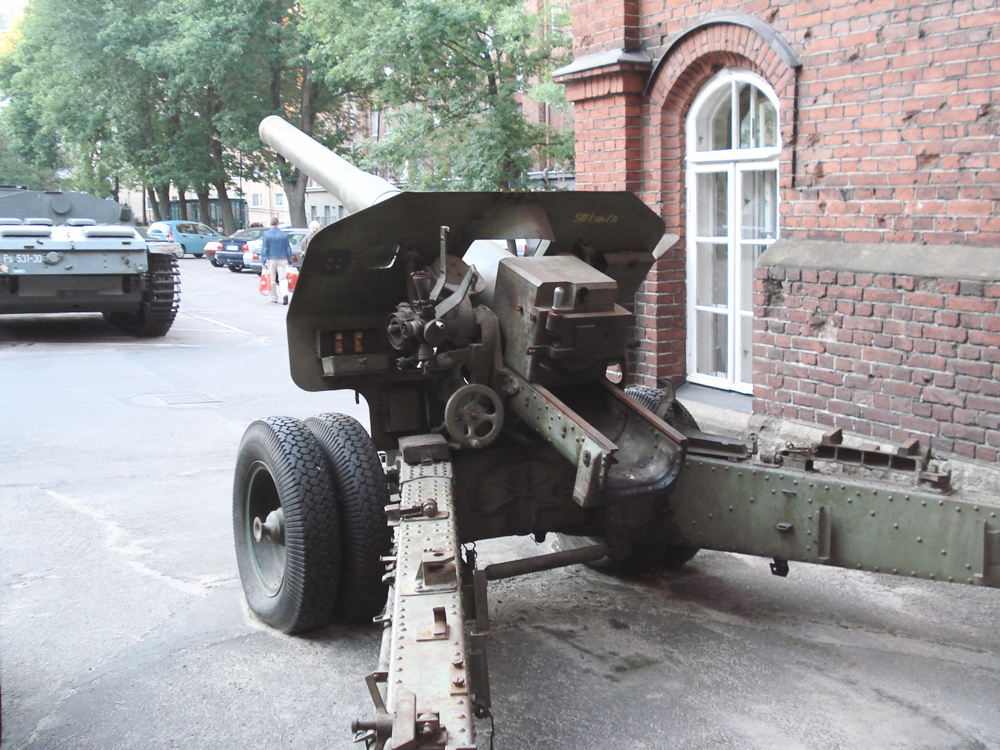
Breech and trails

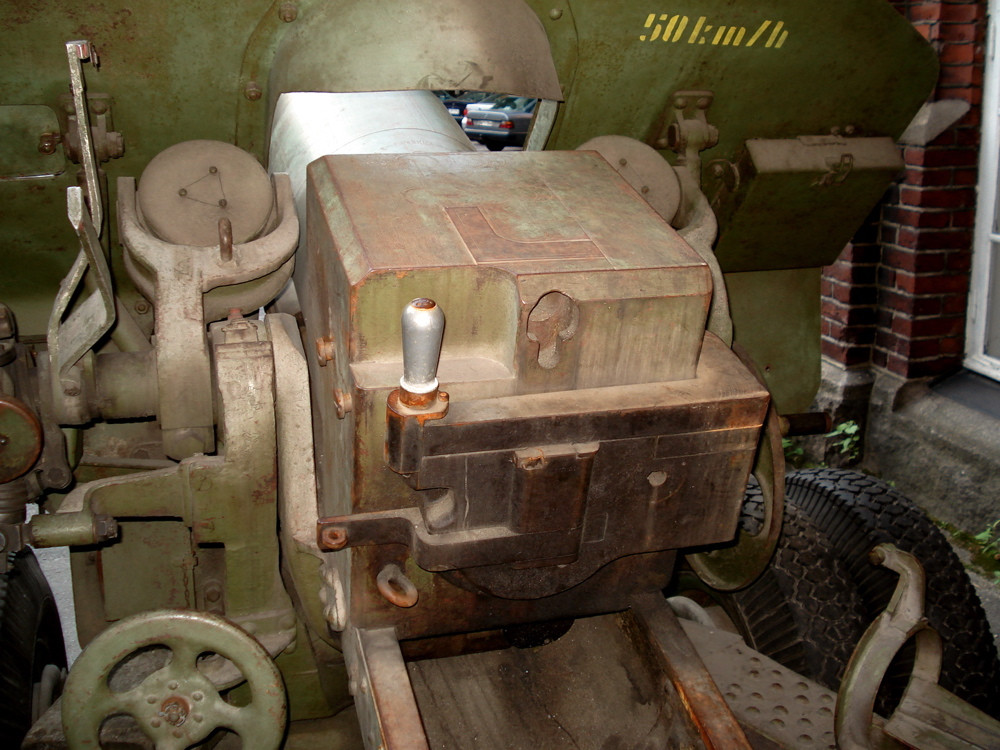
Interrupted screw breechblock

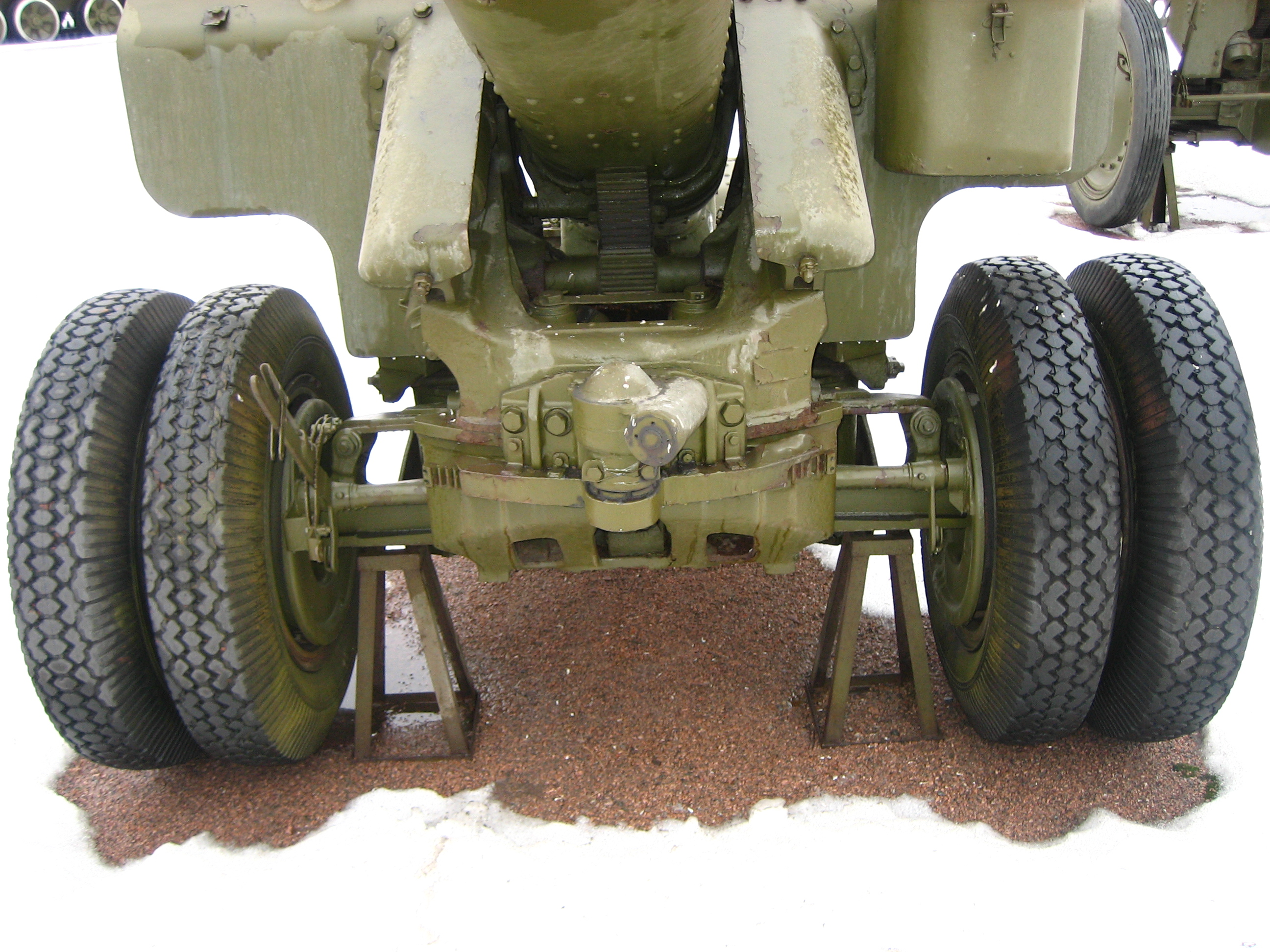
Wheels

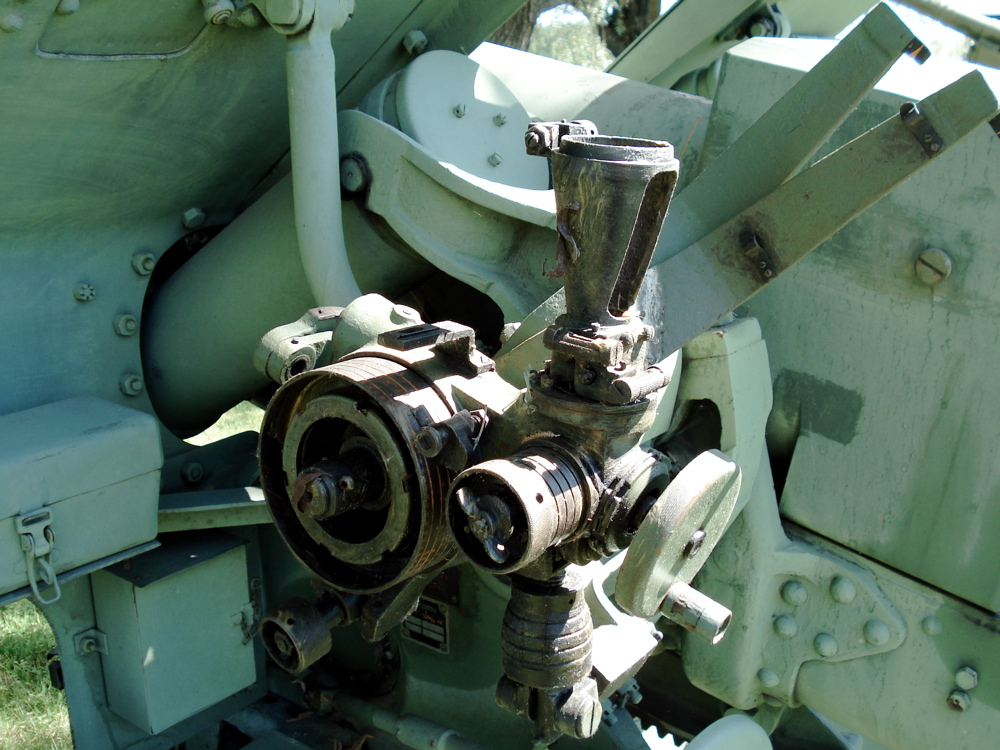
Elements of the panoramic sight

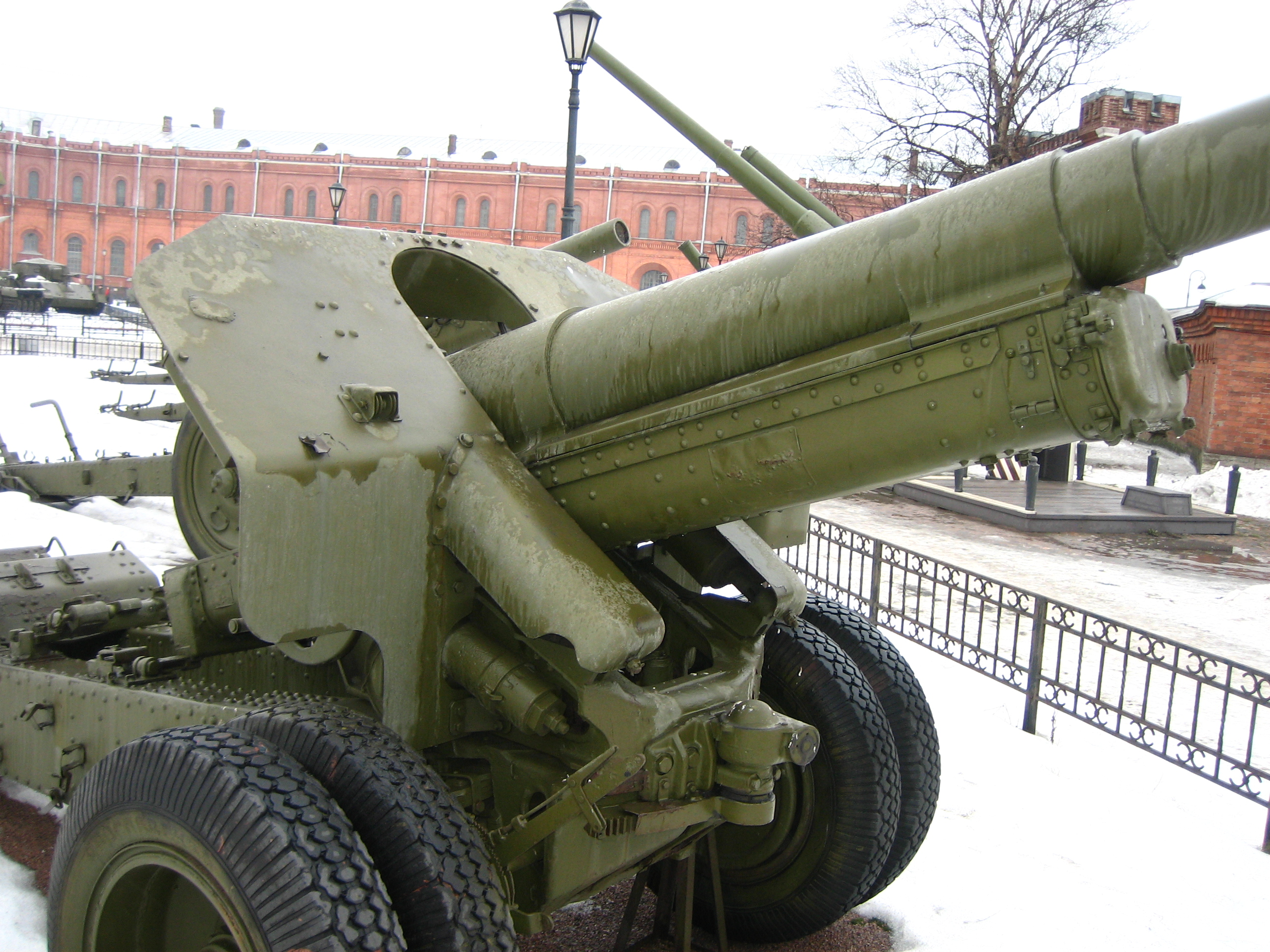
Gun shield

== Organization and employment ==
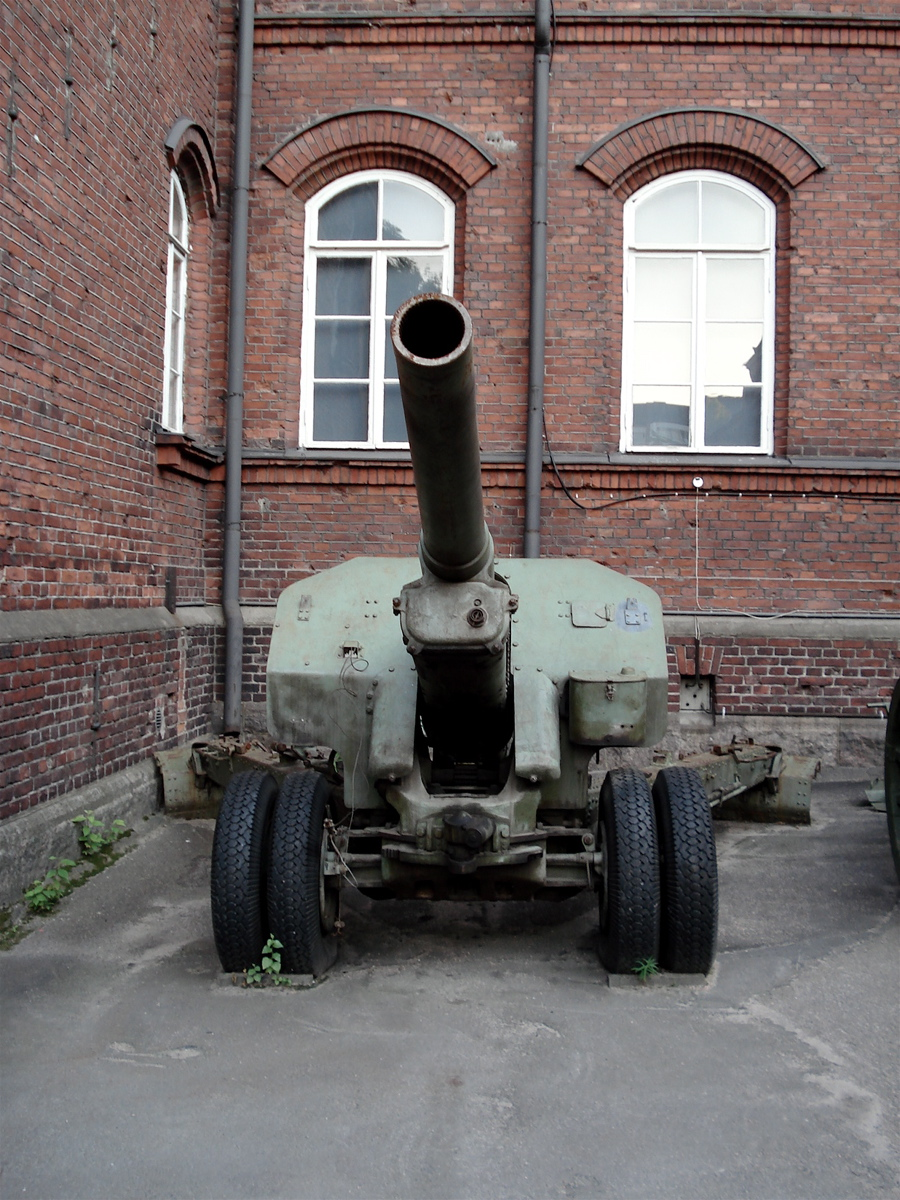
M-10 howitzer, displayed in Helsinki Military Museum.

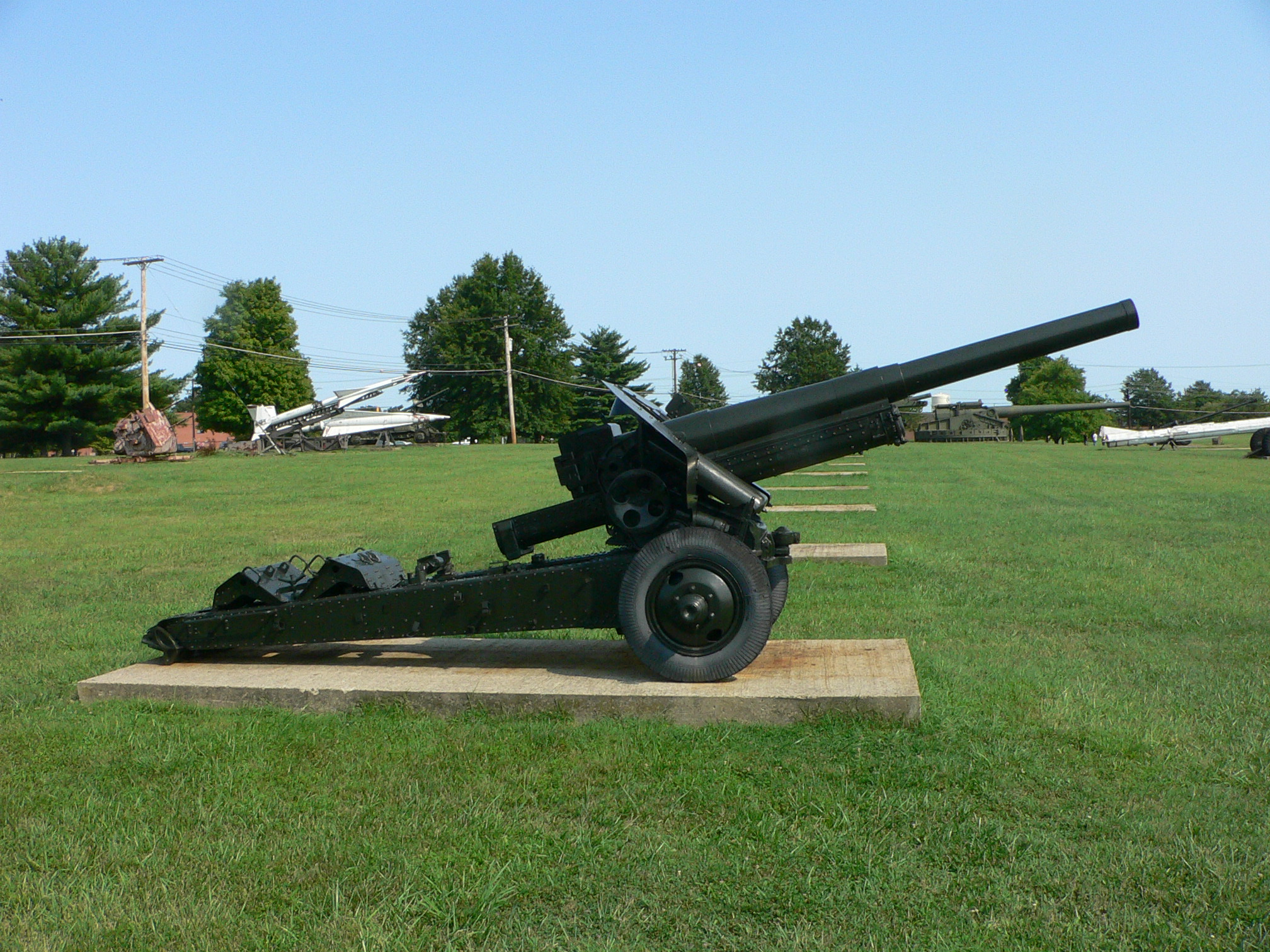
M-10 howitzer in the US Army Ordnance Museum.

Under the organization of 1939, each rifle division had a howitzer regiment with a 152-mm howitzer divizion (artillery battalion in Russian military vocabulary), 12 pieces. In July 1941 these regiments were cancelled. The same fate befell 152-mm howitzer divisions of motorized and armored divisions.

In 1944, rifle corps of the Red Army had one artillery regiment each. Those regiment consisted of five batteries (totaling 20 pieces), equipped with 152-mm howitzers, 122-mm or 107-mm guns.

Reserve of the Main Command included howitzer regiments (48 pieces) and heavy howitzer brigades (32 pieces). Those could be merged to form artillery divisions.

On 1 June 1941 the RKKA possessed more than thousand M-10s. Many were lost in the early phase of the war, combined with a decision to stop the production it meant only limited quantity remained in service; these remaining guns in dwindling numbers were used for the remainder of World War II. The M-10 was used against personnel, fortifications and key objects in the rear.

Many guns were captured by the Wehrmacht early in the war, and adopted as 15,2 cm sFH 443(r). The Finnish Army captured 45 pieces and further 57 were purchased from Germany in 1944. In Finland the howitzer, designated 152 H 38, was issued to five heavy artillery battalions and actively used in battle. Finns rather liked the gun, but considered it somewhat heavy. After the end of the hostilities, the M-10 remained in the Finnish service; in the 1980s there were some considerations of modernizing it, but the idea was dropped; the guns were stored in the army depots until 2000 and then they were finally retired and scrapped.

The surviving M-10 howitzers can be seen in various military museums and war memorials, for example in the:

- Military Historical Museum of Artillery, Engineers and Signal Corps, Saint Petersburg, Russia,
- Brest Fortress,
- US Army Ordnance Museum,
- Helsinki Military Museum
- Hämeenlinna Finnish Artillery Museum,
- National Military Museum, Romania, Bucharest,
- Military Museum, Dej, Romania.
- Crisbecq Battery Museum, Saint-Marcouf-De-L'Îsle, France.

== Variants ==
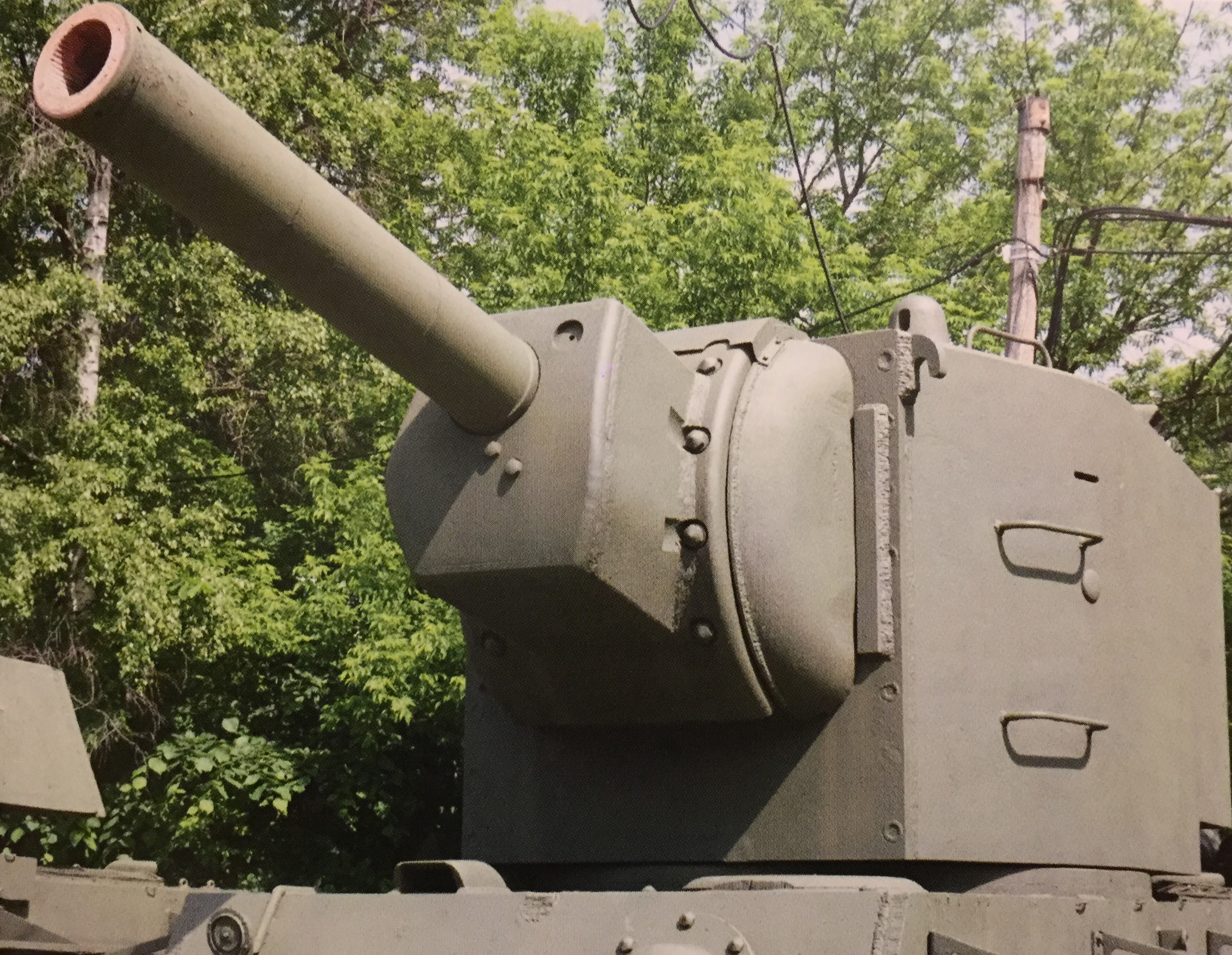
KV-2, armed with 152mm M-10T

In addition to the towed howitzer, a vehicle-mounted variant was developed for use in KV-2 heavy tanks. This variant—152 mm tank howitzer M1938 (M-10T)—had a shorter barrel.

A single prototype with powder bag loading was built in 1939.

== Summary ==
The M-10 project provided the RKKA corps artillery with a modern 152-mm howitzer, which combined good firepower with good mobility (although, as the example of the D-1 shows, the latter characteristic could be improved without compromising the former). When compared to a typical contemporary howitzer of similar calibre, the M-10 had shorter range, but was lighter. E.g. the German 15 cm sFH 18 had a range of 13,325 m—about one kilometer longer than that of the M-10—but also weighed much more (5,510 kg in traveling position). The same can be said about the US 155-mm howitzer M1 (14,600 m, 5,800 kg) or 149 mm howitzer Model 37 manufactured by the Italian Ansaldo (14,250 m, 5,500 kg). A German howitzer with characteristics similar to those of the Soviet one—the 15 cm sFH 36—didn't reach mass production. Compared to older pieces such as the French Schneider model 1917 (11,200 m, 4,300 kg), the M-10 had advantage in range and comparable weight.

== Ammunition ==
1 – HE/Frag shell OF-530, 2 – fragmentary shell O-530, 3 – HEAC (anti-concrete) shell G-530

The M-10 used separate-loading ammunition, with eight different charges. The charges ranges from the "full charge" Zh-536 and smaller charges ranging from the "first" to "sixth", which was the smallest. A "special charge" was used with the BP-540 HEAT projectile. Propellant charges were produced in "full" and "third" variants in munitions factories. All other charges were derived from removing small gunpowder bags from the charge cartridge. For flash suppression there was a special chemical mixture which was inserted into cartridges before night firing. 152 mm projectiles for the M-10 weighed about 40 kg, making a difficult job for loaders, who had to carry the projectiles alone.

When set to fragmentation mode, the OF-530 projectile produced fragments which covered an area 70 meters wide and 30 meters deep. When set to high-explosive (HE) action, the exploding shell produced a crater about 3.5 meters in diameter and about 1.2 meters deep. The OF-530 is still fired from modern 152 mm ordnance pieces of the Russian Army.

The G-530 HEAC anti-concrete shell had a muzzle velocity of 457 m/s when fired with the "first" charge. At a range of one kilometer it had 358 m/s terminal velocity and was able to punch through up to 80 centimeters of reinforced concrete before detonating a TNT charge which increased the total penetration to 114 centimeters. The G-530 could not be fired with a "full" charge without putting the crew at risk of having the shell explode in the barrel. A special version of the shell, the G-530Sh, was developed to allow use with the full charge.

The BP-540 HEAT projectile was not used during World War II. It had an armour penetration of 250 millimeters at an incident angle of 90°, 220 millimeters at 60°, 120 millimeters at 30°.

Available ammunition
Type	Model	Weight	Filler weight	Muzzle velocity	Range
Armor-piercing shells
Naval semi-AP	model 1915/28 (PB-35)	51.07 kg (112.6 lb)	3.2 kg (7.1 lb)
HEAT	BP-540	27.44 kg (60.5 lb)
Anti-concrete shells
Anti-concrete shell	G-530 / G-530Sh	40.0 kg (88.2 lb)	5.1 kg (11 lb)
High-explosive and fragmentation shells
HE-Fragmentation, steel	OF-530	40.0 kg (88.2 lb)	5.47–6.86 kg (12.1–15.1 lb)
HE-Fragmentation, steely iron	OF-530A	40.0 kg (88.2 lb)	5.66 kg (12.5 lb)
HE, old	F-533	40.41 kg (89.1 lb)	8.0 kg (17.6 lb)
HE, old	F-533K	40.68 kg (89.7 lb)	7.3 kg (16 lb)
HE, old	F-533N	41.0 kg (90.4 lb)	7.3 kg (16 lb)
HE, old	F-533U	40.8 kg (90 lb)	8.8 kg (19 lb)
HE, steely iron, old French	F-534F	41.1 kg (91 lb)	3.9 kg (8.6 lb)
HE for 152-mm mortar model 1931	F-521	41.7 kg (92 lb)	7.7 kg (17 lb)
HE, British, for Vickers 152-mm howitzer	F-531	44.91 kg (99.0 lb)	5.7 kg (13 lb)
Shrapnel shells
Shrapnel with 45 sec. tube	Sh-501	41.16–41.83 kg (90.7–92.2 lb)	0.5 kg (1.1 lb) (680–690 bullets)
Shrapnel with Т-6 tube	Sh-501T	41.16 kg (90.7 lb)	0.5 kg (1.1 lb) (680–690 bullets)
Illumination shells
Illumination, 40 sec.	S 1	40.2 kg (89 lb)
Chemical shells
Chemical howitzer shell	HS-530	38.8 kg (86 lb)
Chemical howitzer shell	HN-530	39.1 kg (86 lb)
Chemical (post-war)	ZHZ
