= 15 cm sFH 36 =

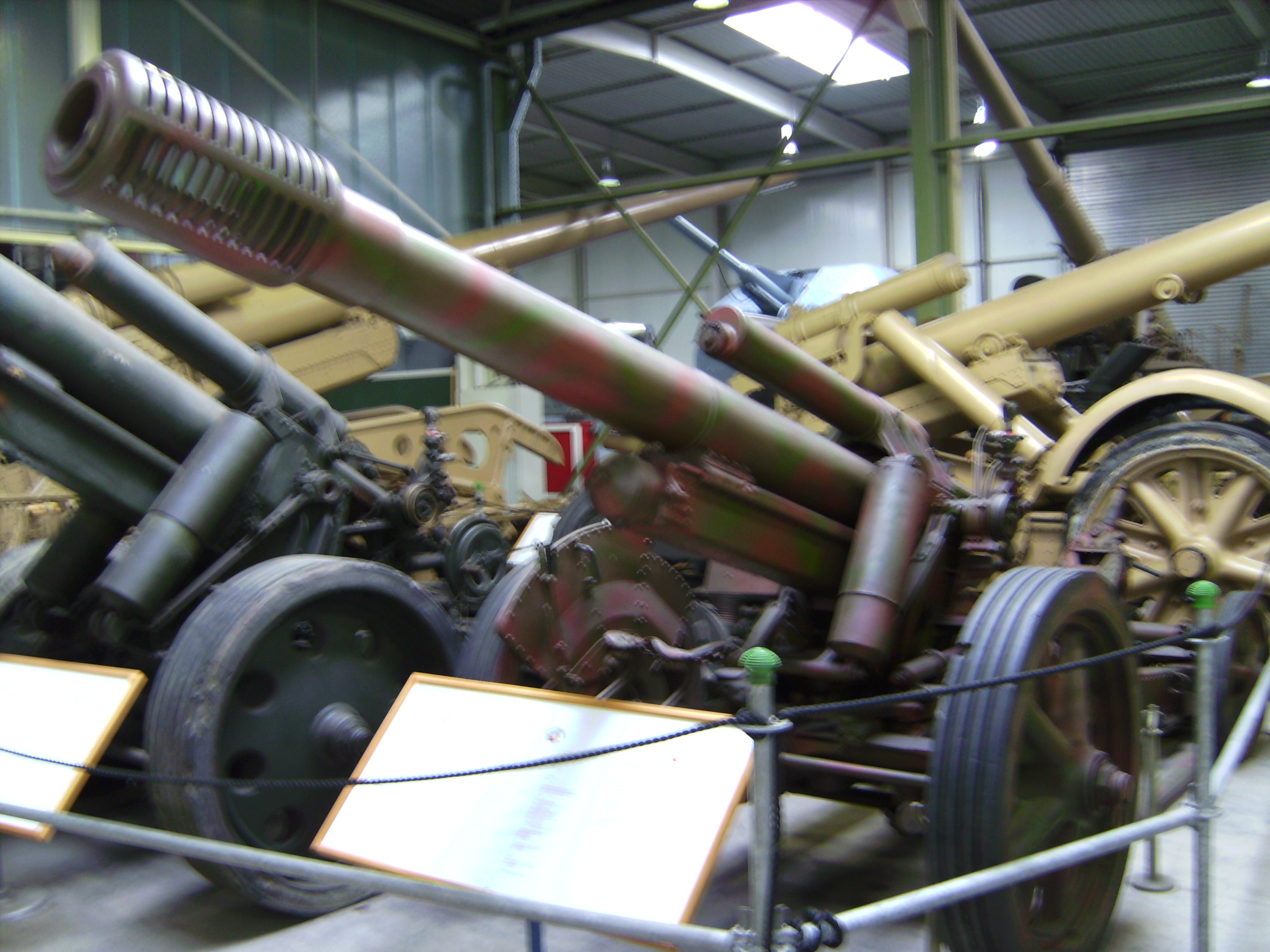
- Type: Howitzer
- Place of origin: Germany

Service history
- In service: 1938–1945 (Germany)
- Used by: Germany
- Wars: World War II

Production history
- Designer: Rheinmetall
- Designed: 1936
- Manufacturer: Rheinmetall
- Produced: 1938-1942

Specifications
- Mass: Combat: 3,280 kg (7,230 lb)
- Length: 10.42 m (34 ft 2 in)
- Barrel length: 3.8 m (12 ft 6 in) L/25.5
- Width: 1.75 m (5 ft 9 in)
- Height: 1.78 m (5 ft 10 in)
- Crew: 7
- Shell: 149 mm × 260 R separate loading cased charge and projectile
- Shell weight: 43.52 kg (95.9 lb) (HE)
- Caliber: 149 mm (5.9 in)
- Breech: Horizontal sliding-block
- Recoil: Hydro-pneumatic
- Carriage: Split trail
- Elevation: 0° to +45°
- Traverse: 56°
- Rate of fire: 4 rpm
- Muzzle velocity: 210–485 m/s (690–1,590 ft/s)
- Maximum firing range: 12.3 km (7.6 mi)

The 15 cm schwere Feldhaubitze 36 or sFH 36 (German: "heavy field howitzer, model 36"), was a shortened lightweight version of the earlier 15 cm schwere Feldhaubitze 18 that was produced in limited numbers from 1938-1942 and used during World War II.

== History ==
In 1935 the army drafted a requirement for a lightened version of the 15 cm schwere Feldhaubitze 18 which could be towed by a single horse team in one piece. After testing in 1938 a design from Rheinmetall was selected to meet the requirement. The new design consisted of a shortened sFH 18 barrel with a prominent muzzle brake with four rows of 13 baffles and a split trail carriage made largely of light alloys. The carriage had two pressed steel wheels with solid rubber tires and for travel the barrel could be disconnected from the hydro-pneumatic recoil system and pulled back to lie on top of the closed trails for towing. A limber with a tow bar was provided for the horse team for towing. The sFH 36 used the same separate loading cased charges and projectile as the sFH 18 and it used the same sliding-block breech as the sFH 18. However, the sFH 36 used up to 7 bagged charges to vary velocity and range, while the sFH 18 used up to 8. Production of the sFH 36 ceased in 1942 due to increased mechanization of the army, limited supplies of light alloys and the prioritization of their use for aircraft production.

The Bundeswehr Museum of German Defense Technology in Koblenz has one of these cannons in its collection.

== sFH 18 and sFH 36 comparison ==
	Barrel Length	Weight	Muzzle Velocity	Range
sFH 18	4.44 m (14 ft 7 in) L/29.5	5,512 kg (12,152 lb)	210–520 m/s (690–1,710 ft/s); 8 charges max	13.32 km (8.28 mi)
sFH 36	3.8 m (12 ft 6 in) L/25.5	3,280 kg (7,230 lb)	210–485 m/s (690–1,590 ft/s); 7 charges max	12.3 km (7.6 mi)

== See also ==
- 152 mm howitzer M1938 (M-10) – Soviet 152 mm howitzer
- M114 155 mm howitzer - US howitzer of similar size
