= Model 10 =

Model 10 or 10-model may refer to:

- Remington Model 10, a pump-action shotgun
- High Standard Model 10, a semi-automatic shotgun
- Smith & Wesson Model 10, a .38 caliber revolver
- Lockheed Model 10 Electra, a twin engine monoplane prop airliner

== See also ==
- Model X (disambiguation)
- Type 10 (disambiguation)
