= M10 (panel building) =

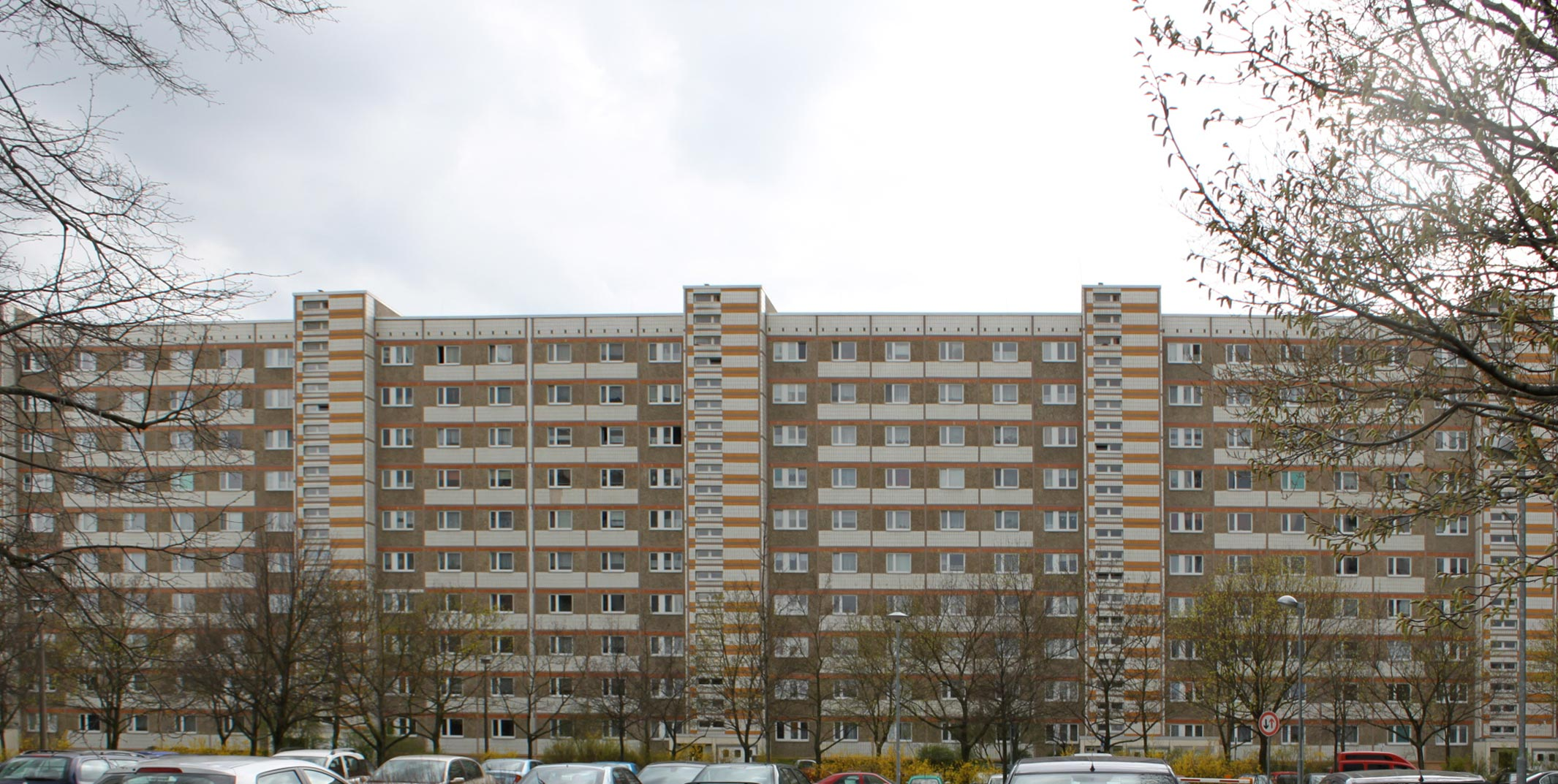
M10 with original facade in Magdeburg Neustädter

M10 is a type of a residential panel building in East Germany. The M stands for Magdeburg where they have been built since the early 1970s.

== Construction ==
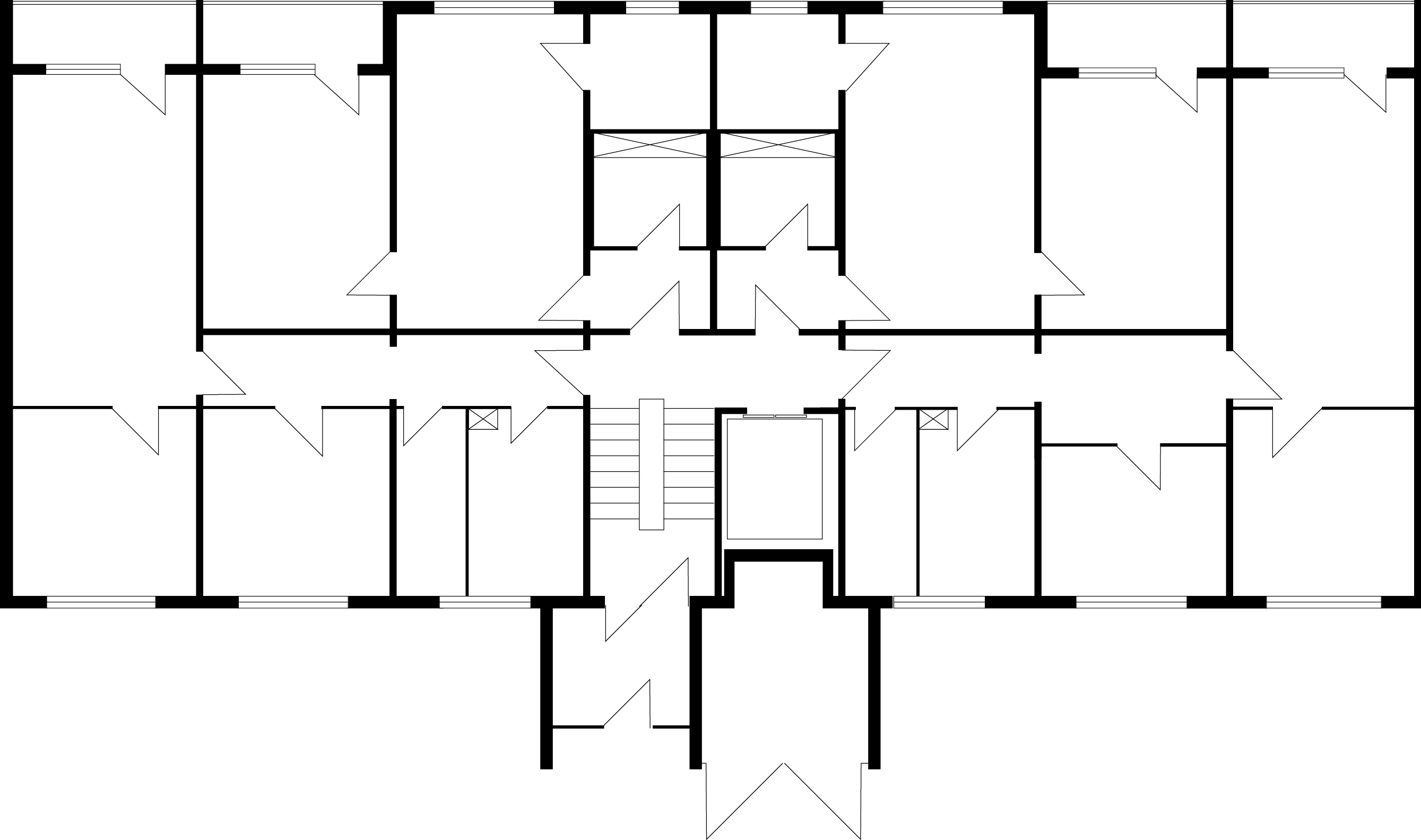
Schematic floor plan of the M10

Building type M10 was generally built as a pair of cores, that is to say that it had two entrance not connected by a corridor. Each of the cores had 40 residential units. The floor plans are organized so that each floor could have either two 4-bedroom apartments (front facing) and two 1-bedroom apartments (rear facing) or two 3-bedroom apartments (front facing) and two 2-bedroom apartments (rear facing) side by side. There are four balconies at each entrance of the entrance opposite side. Depending on the type of apartment they are the 2/3/4 assigned room apartments. The bathrooms are of the smaller type taken from the P2 building type, and could be used at any of the risers in the plan. The kitchens share a back-to-back plumbing riser with the baths, and are accessible only through the living room. Kitchen and bathrooms of the larger units are made accessible through a corridor in the apartment. They shared, however, a common window.

== Apartment/flat types ==
1-bedroom apartments
They have an area of 34 m² are mostly located in the lower 4 floors in the center and are oriented in one direction only. Room and kitchen have windows that Badzelle is inside.

2-bedroom apartments
These apartments with an area of approx 51 sqm located on floors above the 1-bedroom apartments. The second room has access to a balcony and is accessed via the first room. There is no additional floor it. Kitchen and Badzelle are identical with those of 1-room apartments.

3-bedroom apartments
Flats each with about 68 m². On a long flat floor are bathroom and kitchen, a room, and at the end of the living room with access to the loggia. From the living room, another room to be developed.

4-room apartments
In addition to the one-bedroom apartments are two 4-bedroom apartments, each with about 84 m². The layout corresponds to that of 3-room apartments, but can be accessed from another room apartment hallway.

== Development ==
The main entrance to the building is sheltered by a canopy, leading to the vestibule where resident's postal boxes are located. The garbage room is also accessed from this vestibule. The ground floor is - as with all prefabricated buildings in the GDR - half a floor level above the street level and accessible by a stair at the interior side. Unlike the more common P2 building type, the elevator lifts at the M10 were accessed from the mid-landing of the stair which itself was open to the corridor at each level from the basement up to the 9th floor. The dwellings on the 10th floor can only be reached by the stairs. Barrier-free access of the basement is accomplished with a set of ramps from the vestibule of the building. On each floor there are 4 apartments. Small storage closets are located at each stairway landing between the stair landing and the corridor. In some buildings of this type that space has been used for waste chute, before the floorspace was reassigned.

== Specifications ==
Finished parts in the load level to 5.0 t

Basic grid of 3.6 × 5 m

Building depth is usually 11.4 m

Floor to floor height is typically 2.80 m

Number of floors: 10

== Sites ==
- Berlin, Palisadenstraße 36
- Magdeburg Neustädter See
- Magdeburg-Reform
- Schönebeck Moskauer Straße
