= XM (disambiguation) =

Xm or XM may refer to:

- XM Satellite Radio, a US and Canadian radio company now merged into Sirius XM Holdings.
- XM (file format), a computer file format for music
- XM (album), a live-in-studio album recorded by Porcupine Tree
- BMW XM, a full-size luxury performance SUV made by BMW
- Citroën XM, a discontinued executive car made by Citroën
- C.A.I. First or Alitalia Express (IATA code XM, 1997-2005), an Italian airline
- A nonstandard Roman numeral for 990 (standard is CMXC)
- (6903) 1989 XM, a main belt minor planet
- Cross-matching of blood products

== See also ==
- Includes several weapons and other military hardware
- Includes many shows broadcast on XM
- MX (disambiguation)
