= 122 mm howitzer M1938 (M-30) =

Soviet-made field howitzer

122 mm howitzer M1938 (М-30)
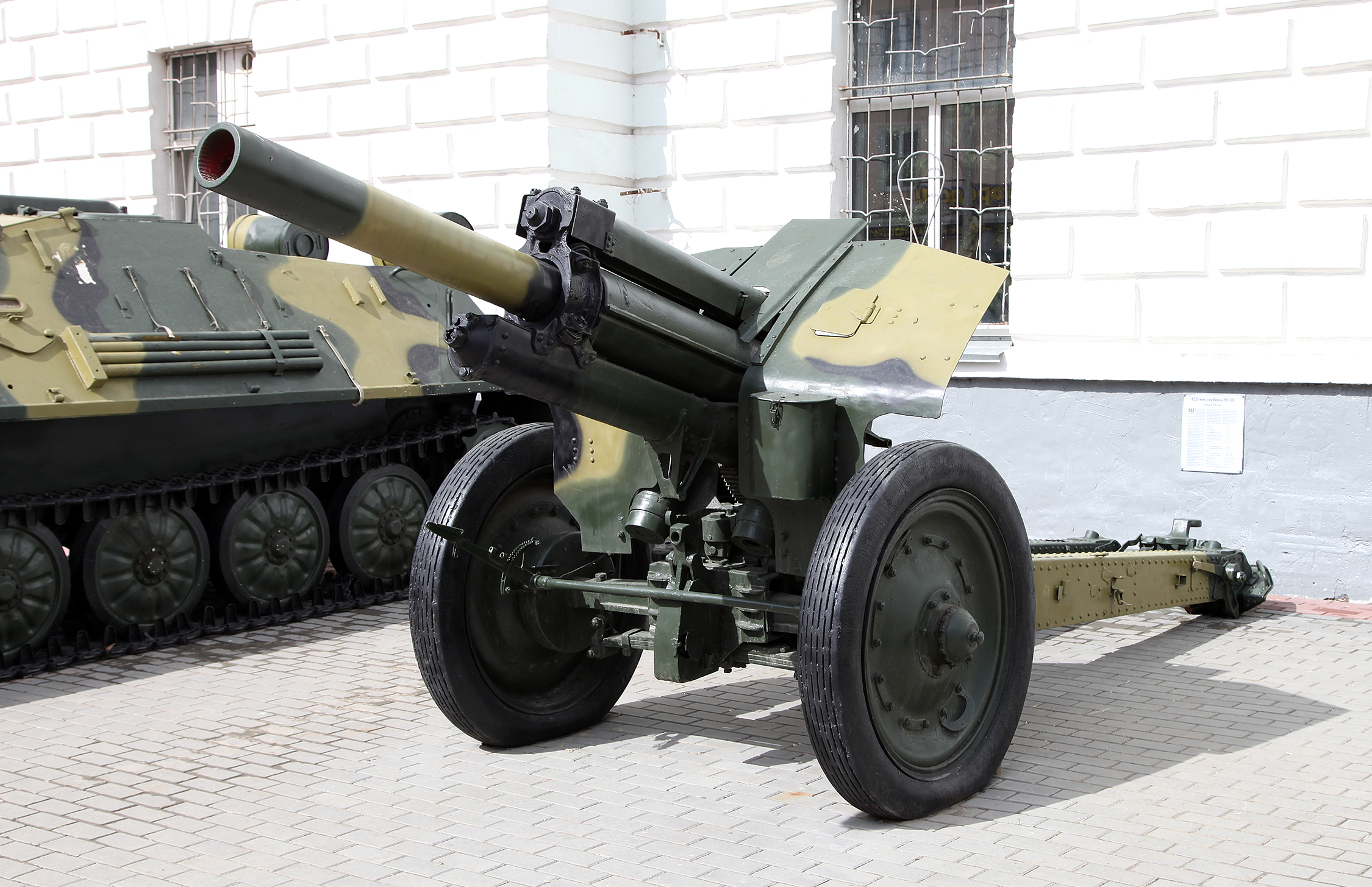
- M-30 in VDV history museum, Russia.
- Type: Field howitzer
- Place of origin: Soviet Union

Service history
- In service: 1939–present
- Wars: World War II; Korean War; Vietnam War; Laotian Civil War; Cambodian Civil War; Indonesian invasion of East Timor; Soviet–Afghan War; Lebanese Civil War; Iran–Iraq War; Second Sudanese Civil War; Syrian Civil War; Sri Lankan Civil War; Russo-Ukrainian War

Production history
- Designer: Design bureau of Motovilikha Plants, headed by F. F. Petrov
- Designed: 1938
- Manufacturer: Plants No. 92 & No. 9
- Produced: 1939–1960
- No. built: 19,266
- Variants: M-30S, Chinese Type 54

Specifications
- Mass: combat: 2,450 kg (5,401 lbs) travel: 3,100 kg (6,834 lbs)
- Length: 5.9 m (19 ft 4 in) (with limber)
- Barrel length: 2.8 m (9 ft 2 in) L/22.7
- Width: 1.98 m (6 ft 6 in)
- Height: 1.82 m (6 ft)
- Crew: 8
- Shell: 122 x 284mm .R loading charge and projectile
- Caliber: 121.92 mm (4.8 in)
- Breech: Interrupted screw
- Recoil: Hydro-pneumatic
- Carriage: Split trail
- Elevation: −3° to 63.5°
- Traverse: 49°
- Rate of fire: 5–6 rounds per minute
- Maximum firing range: 11.8 km (7.33 mi)

The 122 mm howitzer M1938 (M-30) (GRAU index: 52-G-463) is a Soviet 121.92 mm (4.8 inch) howitzer. The weapon was developed by the design bureau of Motovilikha Plants, headed by F. F. Petrov, in the late 1930s, and was in production from 1939 to 1955. The M-30 saw action in World War II, mainly as a divisional artillery piece of the Red Army (RKKA). Captured guns were also employed later in the conflict by the German Wehrmacht and the Finnish Army. Post World War II, the M-30 saw combat in numerous conflicts of the mid- to late twentieth century in service of other countries' armies, notably in the Middle East.

== Development ==
In 1930 Red Army (RKKA) authorities started to look for a new divisional-level howitzer to replace the pre-World War I 122 mm howitzer M1909 and 122 mm howitzer M1910. Although both pieces were eventually modernized, resulting in the 122-mm howitzer M1909/37 and the 122-mm howitzer M1910/30 respectively, these upgrades did not address some shortcomings in the original designs.

The first attempt to develop a new howitzer was made by the KB-2 design bureau under the supervision of German engineers. The design, known as Lubok, reached trials in 1932 and in 1934 was adopted as the 122-mm howitzer model 1934. It had a 23 caliber barrel, a maximum elevation of 50°, traverse of 7°, and a combat and travelling weight of 2,250 and 2,800 kg respectively. Like its predecessors, Lubok had a fixed trail carriage and although it was equipped with suspension, its wheels lacked tires, limiting towing speed to only 10 km/h. Nevertheless, it was undoubtfully superior to the M1910/30 which remained in production until 1941. However, after eight pieces were built in 1934–1935, production was stopped for unclear reasons, possibly relating to the disbanding of KB-2.

In the mid-1930s, the Main Artillery Directorate (GAU) considered a switch to 105 mm guns as used by some other armies. A smaller shell meant that the gun could be lighter and consequently more mobile. On the other hand, a 105 mm gun would also be less powerful. Moreover, there was no Russian or Soviet experience with 105 mm ammunition, while for the 122 mm the country already possessed both production lines and large numbers of already manufactured shells (however similar 107 mm manufacturing equipment and ammunition—for the 107-mm gun M1910—was available). Finally in 1937 the RKKA Head of General Staff I. I. Egorov supported retaining 122 mm ammunition.

Consequently, three howitzers were trialled in 1938–1939. The design bureau of UZTM (Ural Heavy Machinery Plant, Russian: Уральский Завод Тяжёлого Машиностроения, УЗТМ), which was ordered by GAU to design the new howitzer, developed a piece designated U-2. Similar projects were privately undertaken by the design bureaus of Motovilikha Plants, headed by F. F. Petrov (M-30), and by the No. 92 plant under V. G. Grabin (F-25).

The U-2 (barrel length 21 calibers, chamber volume 3.0 litres, horizontal sliding breechblock from Lubok, muzzle brake, combat weight 2,030 kg) reached trials on 5 February 1939 and was rejected because of insufficient carriage strength and inferior ballistics. The F-25 project (barrel length 23 calibers, chamber volume 3.7 litres, horizontal sliding breechblock from Lubok, muzzle brake, combat weight 1,830 kg) was closed by GAU on 23 March 1939 as GAU considered it redundant to the M-30 which had reached trials earlier. The latter, after being returned several times for revision, was finally adopted in September 1939 as the 122 mm divisional howitzer M1938 (Russian: 122-мм гаубица образца 1938 года (М-30)). Its GAU index number was 52-G-463.

=== M-30 versus F-25 ===
A. B. Shirokorad, a well-known author of books detailing the history of the Soviet artillery, has claimed that the F-25 could have been developed into a better gun than the M-30. Grabin's design was about 400 kg lighter, had a greater traverse and had better ground clearance – all this was achieved, according to Shirokorad, without sacrificing ballistics (same barrel length, chamber volume and muzzle length). Considering how long it took to finish the development of the M-30, the F-25's schedule possibly did not significantly lag behind.

There is no official document explaining the advantages the M-30 had over the F-25. Factors that could have influenced the GAU decision were:

- Unlike the F-25, the M-30 was not equipped with a muzzle brake. While softening recoil and thus allowing for a lighter carriage, the muzzle brake has a disadvantage of redirecting some of the gases that escape the barrel toward the ground where they raise dust, revealing the gun's position. Another side-effect of a muzzle brake is the increased muzzle blast behind the gun, adversely affecting the working conditions of its crew.
- The M-30 used many elements from existing guns, most notably the interrupted-screw breechblock of the M1910/30. Since at that time Soviet industry had experienced major difficulties with manufacturing sliding breechblocks (as used by the F-25) for large caliber guns, the lowered technical risk can be considered a significant advantage.
- The stronger carriage of the M-30 could be used – and in fact was used – for more powerful artillery pieces (see 152-mm howitzer M1943 (D-1)).

== Production ==
Mass production of M-30 howitzers began in 1940 at Plant No. 92 in Gorky and No. 9 in Sverdlovsk. The former took part in the production of M-30s only in 1940, building a total of 500 pieces. In addition to towed howitzers, Plant No. 9 produced M-30S barrels for arming SU-122 assault guns. Some 700 barrels (including both serial-production and experimental articles) were manufactured for this purpose. Mass production continued into 1955. In 1950–1960, the M-30 was also produced by Huta Stalowa Wola in Poland where it was known as Wz.1938.

Production of М-30s, pcs.
Year	1940	1941	1942	1943	1944	1945	1946	1947	Total
Produced, pcs.	639	2,762	4,240	3,770	3,485	2,630	210	200	19,266
Year	1948	1949	1950	1951	1952	1953	1954	1955	19,266
Produced, pcs.	200	250	–	300	100	100	280	100	19,266

== Description ==
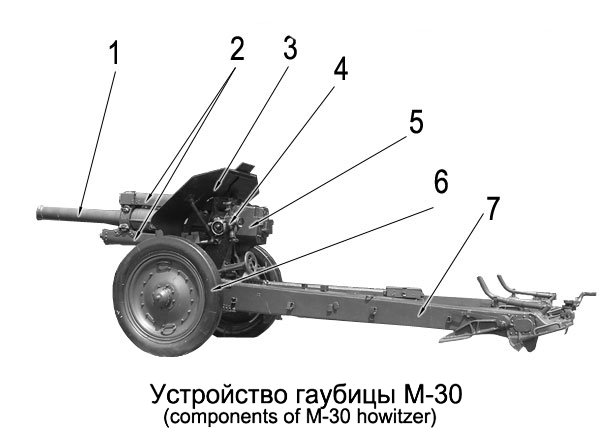
1. Barrel, 2. Recoil system, 3. Gunshield, 4. Panoramic sight, 5. Breech with breechblock, 6. Wheels, 7. Split trails of a carriage

The barrel of the M-30 was of built-up construction and consisted of a liner, jacket and breech. The breechblock was of interrupted screw type, with forced cartridge case extraction. The gun was equipped with a hydraulic recoil buffer and hydropneumatic recuperator. A panoramic sight was used for both indirect and direct fire.

The M-30 had a modern split trail carriage with leaf spring suspension and steel wheels with rubber tires. It was usually towed by vehicle without a limber. The carriage allowed for a towing speed of up to 50 km/h on paved road and up to 35 km/h on gravel or dirt roads, although the gun could also be moved by a team of six horses, in which case a limber was used. When the trails were swung open the suspension locked automatically . In an emergency it was possible to shoot in a "single trail" mode, at the price of a drastically reduced traverse (1°30'). The time required to set the gun up for combat was about 1–1.5 minutes.

The carriage of the M-30 was later used for the D-1 152 mm howitzer.

== Organization and employment ==
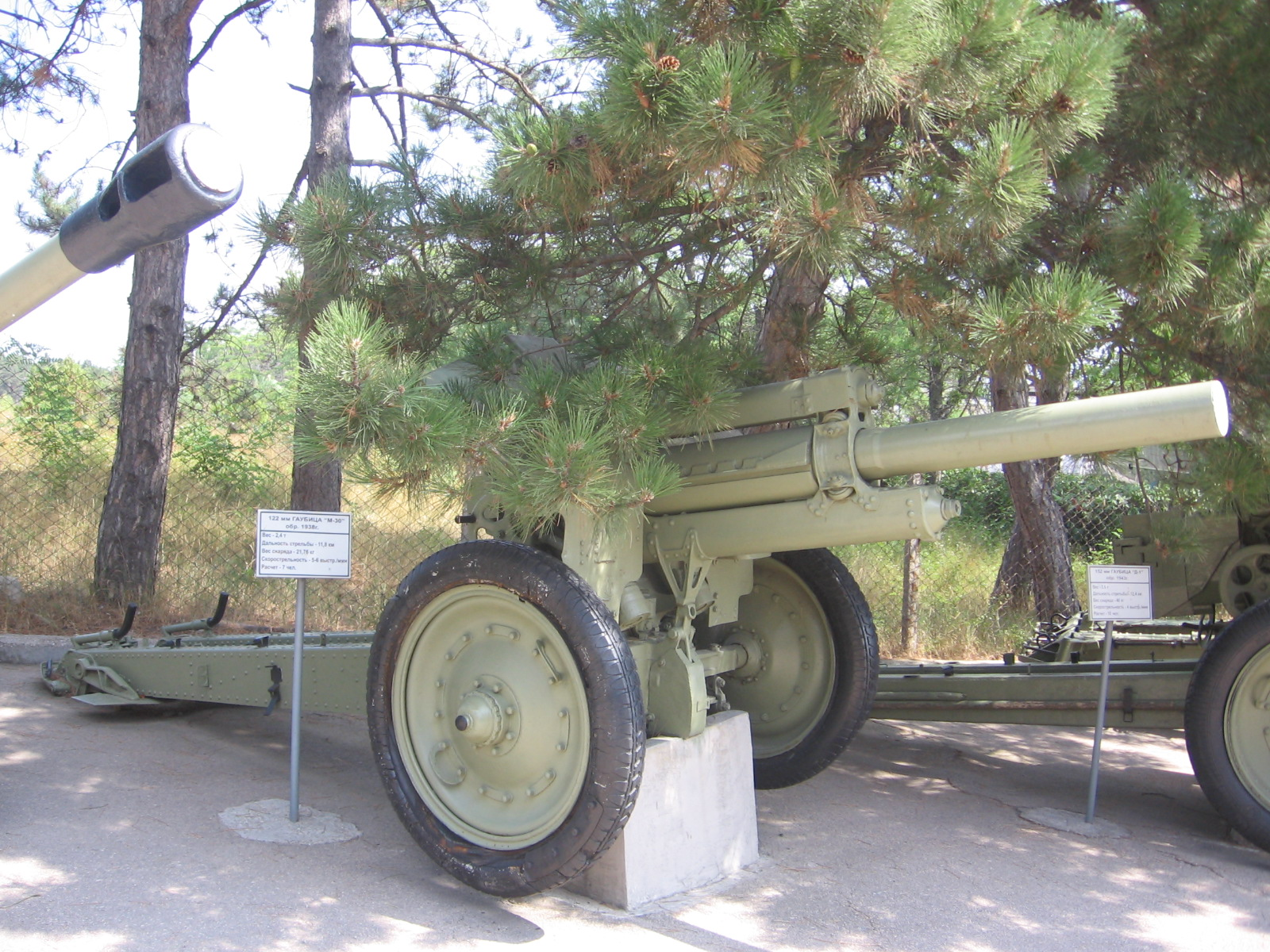
M-30 in Sevastopol

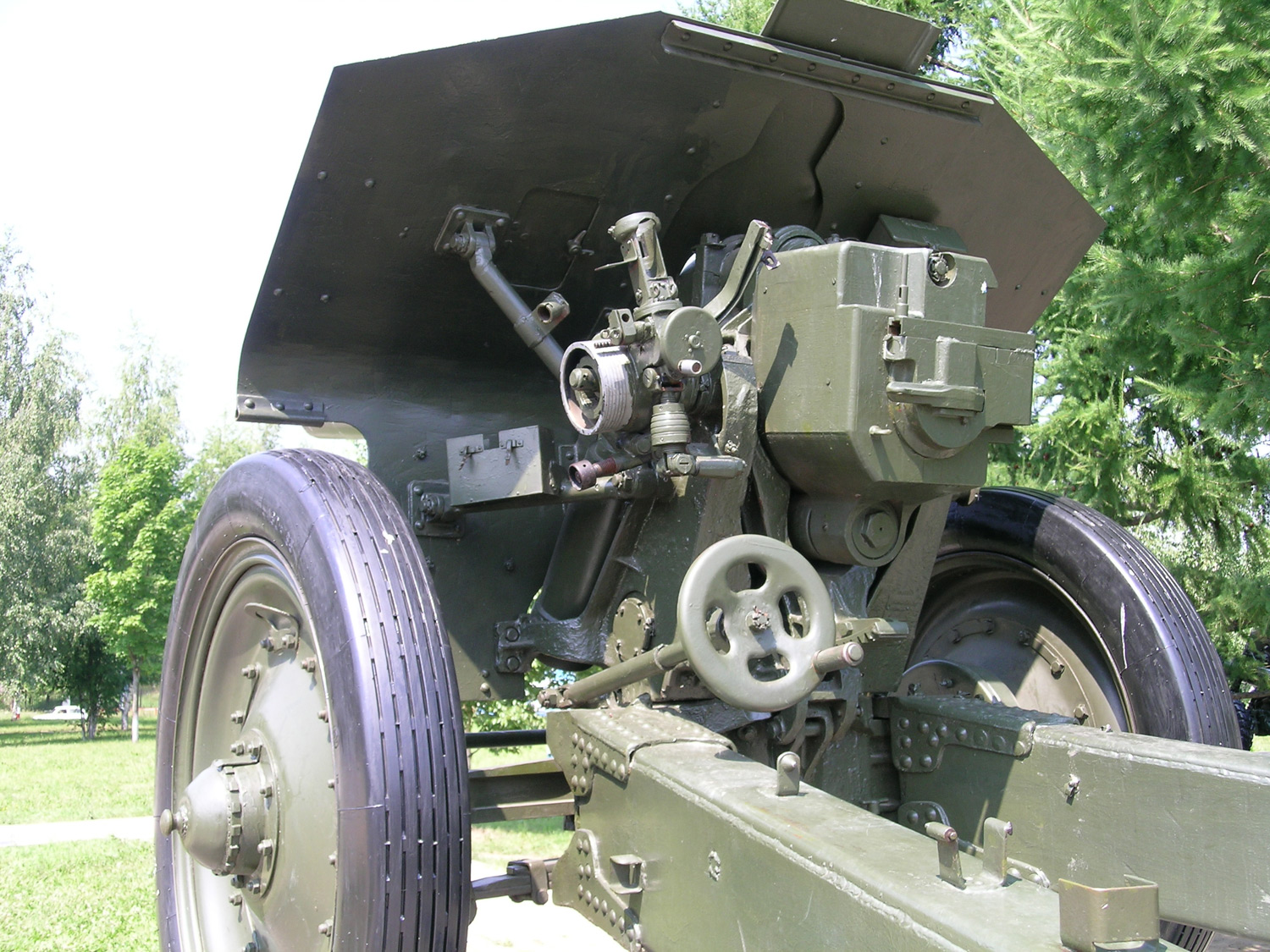
M-30 in Nizhny Novgorod, Russia

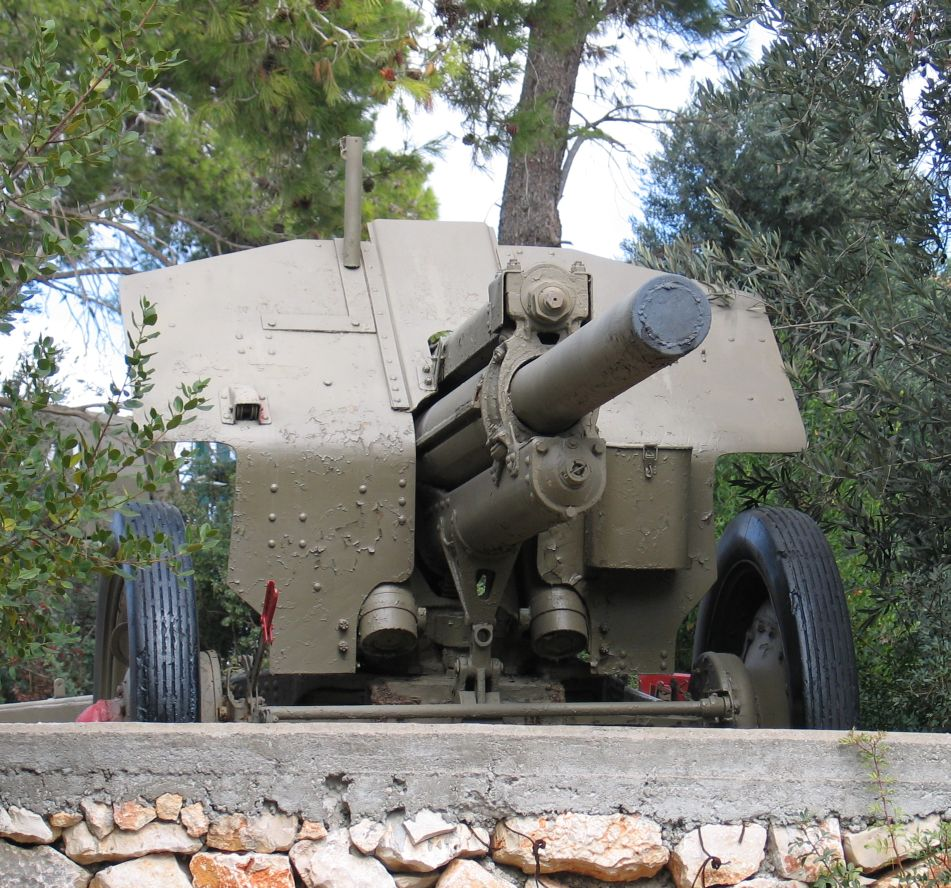
M-30 in Beyt ha-Totchan museum, Israel

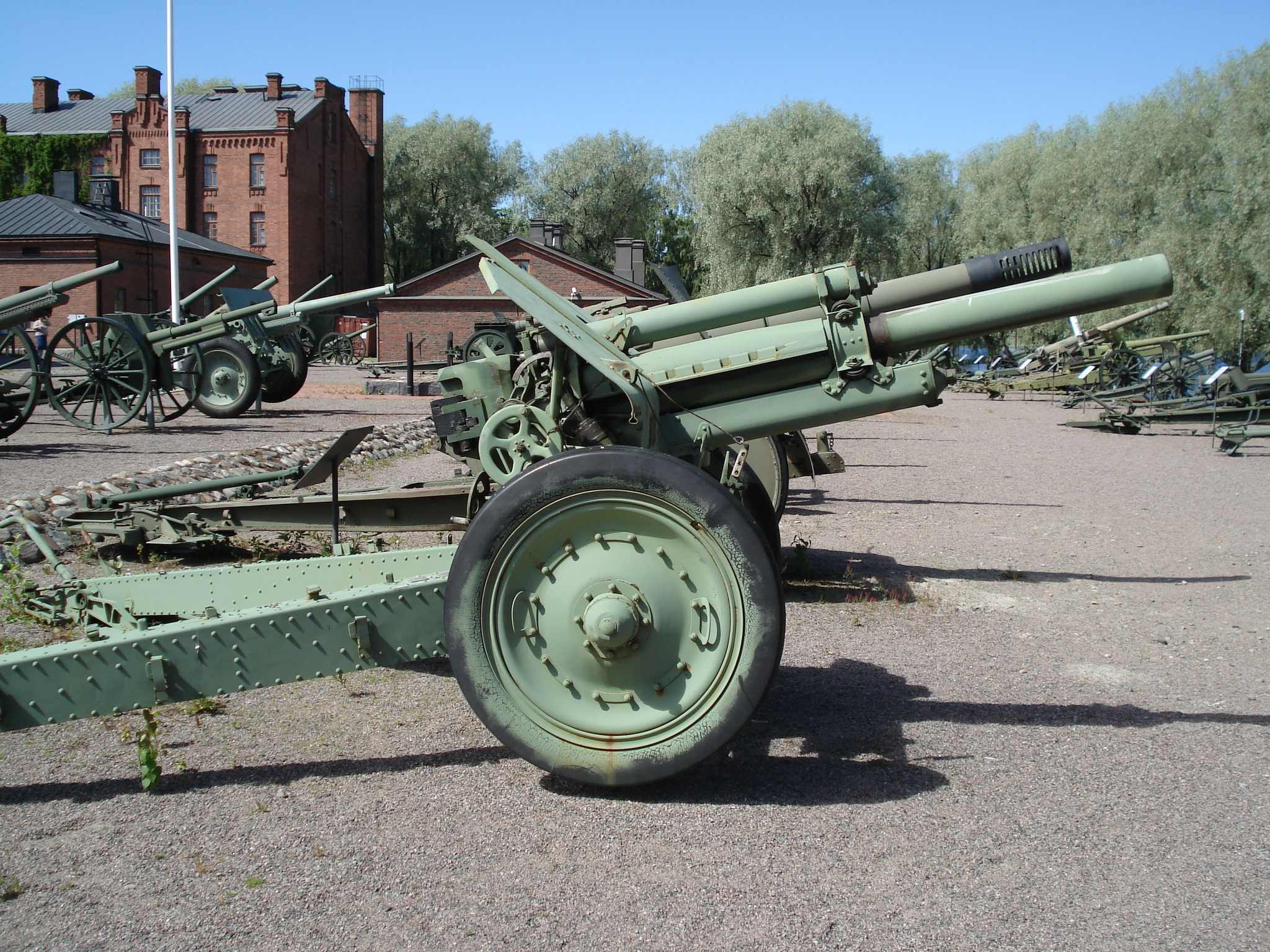
M-30 in Hämeenlinna Artillery Museum, Finland

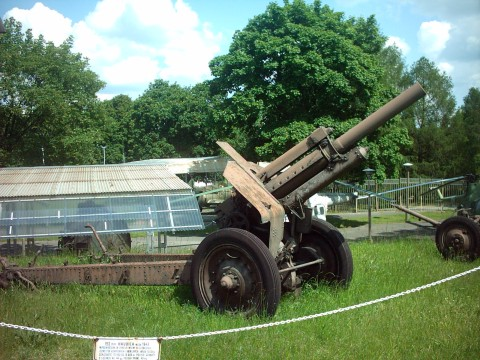
M-30 in Poznań, Poland

=== Red Army ===
The M-30 was a divisional level howitzer. According to the 1939 organization, each rifle division had two artillery regiments; one light regiment (a battalion of 76 mm guns; two mixed battalions with one battery of 76 mm guns and two batteries of 122 mm howitzers) and one howitzer regiment (a battalion of 122 mm howitzers and a battalion of 152 mm howitzers), giving 28 122 mm howitzers per division. In June 1940, one more battalion of 122 mm howitzers was added to the howitzer regiment, bringing the number of guns in each unit to 32. In June 1941, the howitzer regiment was removed and the number of howitzers dropped to 16. This organization was used throughout the war except in Guards rifle divisions, which from December 1942 had three artillery battalions (two batteries of 76 mm guns and one battery of 122 mm howitzers each), totaling 12 howitzers. From December 1944, they received an extra howitzer regiment (5 batteries, 20 howitzers) and from June 1945 rifle divisions were reorganized identically.

Mountain rifle divisions in 1939–1940 had one battalion of 122 mm howitzers (3 batteries, 9 guns). From 1941,they received instead one artillery regiment (2 battalions, each of four-gun batteries) with 24 howitzers; however, in early 1942, only one battalion (2 batteries, 8 howitzers) remained. From 1944, howitzers were removed from mountain rifle divisions.

Motorized divisions had two mixed battalions (a battery of 76 mm guns and two batteries of 122 mm howitzers), totaling 12 howitzers. Tank divisions had one battalion with 12 howitzers. Until the divisional artillery was removed in August 1941, Cavalry divisions had two batteries of 122 mm howitzers, totaling eight.

Until late 1941, rifle brigades had a battery of four 122 mm howitzers. 122 mm howitzers were also used by the howitzer brigades of the Reserve of the Main Command (72–84 pieces).

By 1 June 1941, 1,667 M-30s were in service, comprising only a fraction of the RKKA divisional howitzers. As the war progressed, their share grew rapidly due to mass production and because many older guns were lost in combat in 1941–42.

M-30 howitzers were primarily employed for indirect fire against enemy personnel. They were also used against field fortifications, for clearing minefields and for breaching barbed wire. Their HE-fragmentation shells presented a danger to armoured vehicles. Fragments created by the explosion could penetrate up to 20 mm of armour, – enough against thinly armoured vehicles. The shells could also damage chassis, sights or other elements of heavier armoured vehicles.

For self-defense against enemy tanks a HEAT shell was developed in 1943. Before 1943, crews were required to rely on the high-explosive action of their regular ammunition, with some degree of success. According to a German report from 1943, even a Tiger was once heavily damaged by SU-122 assault guns firing high-explosive shells.

M-30 howitzers were towed by a variety of means, from horses, oxen and both Soviet and American-produced Lend-Lease trucks (such as the Dodge WC series and Studebaker US6s) and STZ-5 and Ya-12 purpose-built artillery tractors. When necessary, the gun could be manhandled by its artillery crew.

In 1944, the Artillery Regiment of a typical Russian Rifle Division was armed with 36 122mm Howitzers, along with 72 76.2mm ZiS-3 field guns.

The gun was eventually replaced by the 122-mm howitzer D-30 after the latter was adopted for service in 1960. A small number of operational M-30 howitzers are still present in Russian Army ordnance depots. They are being gradually withdrawn from reserve. M-30s featured in many Soviet movies used for novice artillery crew training. These movies were made in the 1960s when more modern D-30 howitzers were becoming available; however, the M-30 was considered by authorities as much more suitable for training purposes. The movies are still in use despite the absence of M-30 howitzers even in practice exercises.

=== Russia ===
In August 2024, Russian personnel released video footage of combat use of the M-30 by the Russian Armed Forces during the Russian invasion of Ukraine.

=== Other operators ===
A number of M-30s fell into the hands of the Wehrmacht in 1941–1942 and were adopted as 12,2 cm s.F.H.396(r) heavy howitzers. Germany began mass production of 122 mm ammunition for these and other captured howitzers, producing 424,000 shells in 1943, 696,700 in 1944 and 133,000 in 1945. Some captured M-30s were used in the Atlantic Wall fortifications.

The Finnish Army captured 41 guns of the type and adopted them as the 122 H 38. These guns fired 13,298 shells in combat; only a few pieces were lost. The gun was well liked; some were used for training or stored in depots until the mid-1980s.

The Kingdom of Romania captured in 1941 a number of 477 various types of 122 mm howitzers and guns including M1931/37 and were used as divisional artillery for units rebuilt in 1943. The M-30 was used on the first four prototypes of the Mareșal tank destroyer, having a muzzle brake attached to it by the Romanians.

After World War II, the gun was supplied to many countries around the globe. With the Egyptian and Syrian armies, it saw action in the Arab-Israeli Wars. Some of these guns were captured by Israel, although it is unclear whether they were ever employed by the Israel Defense Forces. The People's Republic of China organized their own production of M-30 howitzers under the Type 54 designation.

According to Ian V. Hogg, the M1938 howitzer "must, surely, be the most prolific piece of artillery in history".

== Users ==
The M-30 and the Type 54 are still being used in several armies.

=== Current ===
- Afghanistan – 232
- Armenia – n/a
- Algeria – 60
- Bangladesh – 57 Type 54/Type 54-1
- Bolivia – 36 Type 54-1
- Cambodia – Type 54
- China – Type 54-1
- DR Congo – less than 77
- Cuba
- Egypt – 324
- Ethiopia – less than 464
- Guinea-Bissau – 9–18
- Indonesia – 28
- Iran – 100 Type 54
- Iraq – n/a
  - Kurdistan – 80 Peshmerga
- North Korea
- Kyrgyzstan – 35
- Laos – less than 20
- Lebanon – 26
- Libya – transferred from Russia to the Libyan National Army in 2017
- Moldova – 17
- Mongolia
- Mozambique – less than 24
- North Macedonia – 56
- Pakistan – 490 Type 54
- Romania – 72 (modernized M-30M variant)
- Russia – 3,750, in reserve
- Sahrawi Republic – 13 est.
- Sri Lanka – Type 54/Type 54-1
- Sudan – 24 M-30 and 76 Type 54
- South Sudan
- Syria
- Tanzania – 80 Type 54-1
- Uganda – 18
- Uzbekistan – 540
- Vietnam – Type 54
- Yemen – 50
- Zimbabwe – 24 Type 54

=== Former ===
- Albania
- Bosnia and Herzegovina
- Bulgaria – 108 sold to Macedonia in 1999
- Republic of the Congo
- Croatia – 45 in 2002
- Czech Republic – Vz 38/74
- Czechoslovakia
- East Germany
- Nazi Germany – Captured, designated as 12,2 cm s.F.H.396(r)
- Finland - Captured, designated as 122 H 38
- Hungary – 230 Tarack 38/68M
- Israel
- Islamic State
- Kazakhstan – 24, sold to Russia
- Liberia – 6 delivered from Romania
- Myanmar
- Poland – Wz.1938/1985, 280 in 2002
- Slovakia – 46 in 2002
- Somalia
- Soviet Union
- Tajikistan
- Ukraine
- Yugoslavia – 240 delivered in 1962–1963
- Zaire

== Variants ==
=== Former Soviet Union ===
- M-30S – Slightly modified variant; was used as the main armament of the SU-122 assault gun.
- U-11 – A gun with identical ballistics, but equipped with a more compact recoil mechanism for easier mounting in vehicles. It was tried on the experimental SU-122M and rejected due to insufficient reliability. A variant of the same gun was also mounted on the experimental Obiekt 234 tank, also known as Iosif Stalin no. 2 (not to be confused with the IS-2).
- D-6 – Another vehicle mounted gun with identical ballistics. It was used on the experimental SU-122-III and, like the U-11, proved unreliable.

=== People's Republic of China ===
- Type 54 – Licence version.
- Type 54-1 – Slightly improved version.

=== Poland ===
- Wz.1938/1985 – Existing Wz.1938 that was fitted with a castor wheel, PGO-9H sight and a second firing mechanism for direct fire.

=== Romania ===
- M-30M – In the 1980s Romanian Army M-30s were upgraded with new, larger pneumatic wheels, new brakes, a new optical sight for direct fire and a second height sighting mechanism for anti-tank combat. These upgraded howitzers were designated M-30M.

== Self-propelled mounts ==
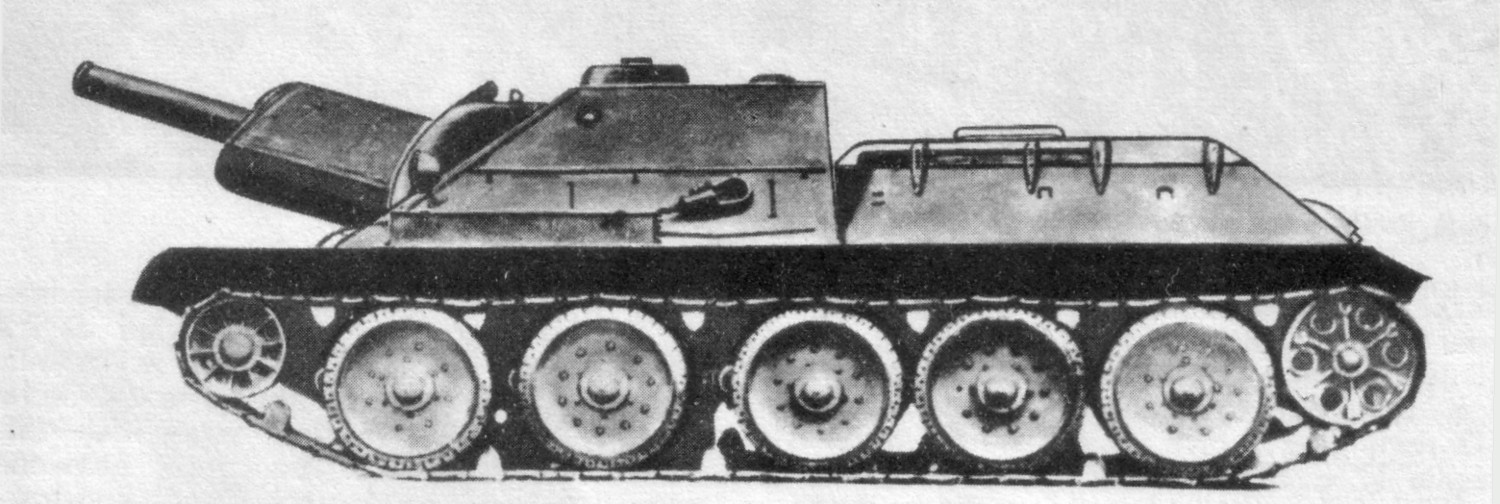
SU-122 assault gun.

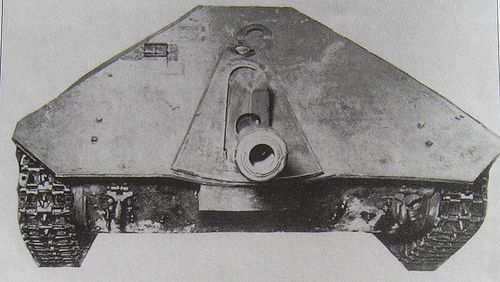
Romanian Mareșal tank destroyer (M-00 prototype, mounting a 122 mm M-30 with a muzzle brake)

=== Former Soviet Union ===
The M-30 was mounted on the following armoured fighting vehicles (AFV):

- SU-122, the Soviet medium assault gun built on a T-34 chassis. The mass production continued from December 1942 until September 1943. In total 638 SU-122s were built.
- SG-122, Soviet self-propelled artillery vehicles based on captured German Pz Kpfw III or StuG III AFVs. About twenty were built in the early months of 1943.

=== Nazi Germany ===
- 12,2-cm Kanone (r) auf Geschützwagen Lorraine-Shlepper (f), the German self-propelled artillery vehicle, based on a captured armoured French artillery tractor (the Lorraine 37L). There was at least one vehicle of this type, which fought in France on a railroad car as part of a German armoured train.

=== People's Republic of China ===
- Type WZ302 – Combination of the Type 54 or Type 54-1 with a tracked vehicle Type B531. The military designator is Type 70 SPH. The initial model had only 4 roadwheels, but the improved Type WZ302A or Type 70-1 has 5. The final production model with new signals equipment is known as Type WZ302B or Type 70-2. All models have a basic load of 40 rounds of 122 mm.

=== Romania ===
- Mareșal – World War II tank destroyer whose first four prototypes used the 122 mm M-30 howitzer with a muzzle brake attached to it. It was replaced with the Romanian 75 mm Reșița M1943 anti-tank gun for later prototypes and the serial production vehicles.

== Summary ==
In the M-30, RKKA units finally received a modern divisional howitzer which successfully combined increased firepower and better mobility with reliability and ease of use. A summary of its employment by the Red Army was provided by Marshal G. F. Odintsov, who said "Nothing can be better". The long post-war employment of the howitzer is additional testimony to its combat and operational utility and effectiveness.

It is hard to compare the M-30 directly with contemporary foreign guns since the artillery of France, Germany and United States employed in similar roles was either the much smaller 105 mm (Great Britain used the even smaller—87.6 mm—25 pounder gun-howitzer) or much larger 150 to 155 mm caliber guns. Howitzers of similar calibers existed but most of those were World War I era pieces, such as the Vickers 114 mm howitzer used by the Finnish Army. Naturally, 150 mm howitzers were more powerful, but much heavier than the M-30; while 105 mm pieces were lighter but their smaller shells contained less explosive.

The most direct German equivalent was the 10.5 cm leFH 18 light howitzer. Weighing 1985 kg, it had a maximum elevation of 42°, muzzle velocity of 470 m/s and maximum range of 10,675 m. In the upgraded leFH 18/40 version, muzzle velocity was improved to 540 m/s, elevation to 45° and range to 12,325 m. About equal in range, the German howitzer had a less powerful HE shell and its smaller maximum elevation made it less effective against dug-in troops, although it also weighed some 400 kg less than the M-30. Both guns were well suited for mass production with 16,887 M-30s and 15,388 leFH 18 built in 1941–45.

== Ammunition data ==
The M-30 could fire all types of 122 mm howitzer ammunition used by the RKKA, including old Russian and imported shells. During and after World War II, new types of ammunition were developed, notably HEAT shells. The World War II era HEAT shell BP-460A could pierce 100–160 mm of armor at 90°; the post-war BP-1 managed 200 mm at 90°, 160 mm at 60°, and 80 mm at 30°. HE-Frag projectiles of type OF-462 that were initially developed for the M-30 howitzer can be fired from modern 122 mm ordnance pieces and are still in Russian Army service.

Available ammunition
Type	Model	Weight, kg	HE weight, kg	Velocity, m/s (max. propellant load)	Range, m
Armour-piercing shells
HEAT (from May 1943)	BP-460A	335 (propellant load 4)	2,000
High explosive and fragmentation shells
HE-Frag, steel (1,000 fragments to hit personnel in radius of 30 meters)	OF-462	21.76	3.67	515	11,720
Fragmentation, steely cast iron	O-462A	21.7	458	10,800
Fragmentation, steely cast iron	О-460А
HE, old	F-460
HE, old	F-460N
HE, old	F-460U
HE, old	F-460K
Shrapnel shells
Shrapnel with 45 sec tube	Sh-460
Shrapnel with T-6 tube	Sh-460T
Chemical shells
Fragmentation-chemical	OH-462	515	11,800
Chemical	H-462	21.8	–
Chemical	H-460	–
Other shells
Illumination	S-462	–	479	8,500
Propaganda	A-462	–	431	8,000
Smoke, steel	D-462	515	11,800
Smoke, steely cast iron	D-462A	515	11,800

== Surviving pieces ==
M-30 howitzers are on display in a number of military museums and are widely used as memorial pieces. Among other places, the gun can be seen at the following locations:

- Central Armed Forces Museum and in the Museum of Great Patriotic War, Moscow.
- Museum of Artillery and Engineering Forces, Saint Petersburg.
- Museum of Heroic Defense and Liberation of Sevastopol on Sapun Mountain, Sevastopol
- Nizhny Novgorod, as a memorial piece at Marshal Zhukov's square.
- Artillery Museum in Hämeenlinna, Finland.
- IDF History Museum (Batey ha-Osef; Tel Aviv) and IDF Artillery Museum (Beyt ha-Totchan; Zichron Yaakov), Israel.
- Central Museum of The Royal Regiment of Canadian Artillery, Shilo Manitoba
- Zone 5 Military Museum, Danang
- In the National Military Museum, Romania, Bucharest.
- Captured piece at the War Museum, Huntington Park, Newport News, Virginia, United States (behind the museum, Mar 2021)
- Another captured piece at the Texas Military Forces Museum, Camp Mabry, Austin, Texas, United States.
