= M1909 =

M1909 may refer to:

- Hotchkiss M1909 Benét-Mercié machine gun
- Skoda M1909 machine gun
- M1909 revolver - a Colt pistol
- 152 mm howitzer M1909/30 - A Russian artillery piece
- 122 mm howitzer M1909/37 - A Russian artillery piece
- 14-inch gun M1909 - A US Army artillery piece
