= Obusier de 120 mm mle 15TR =

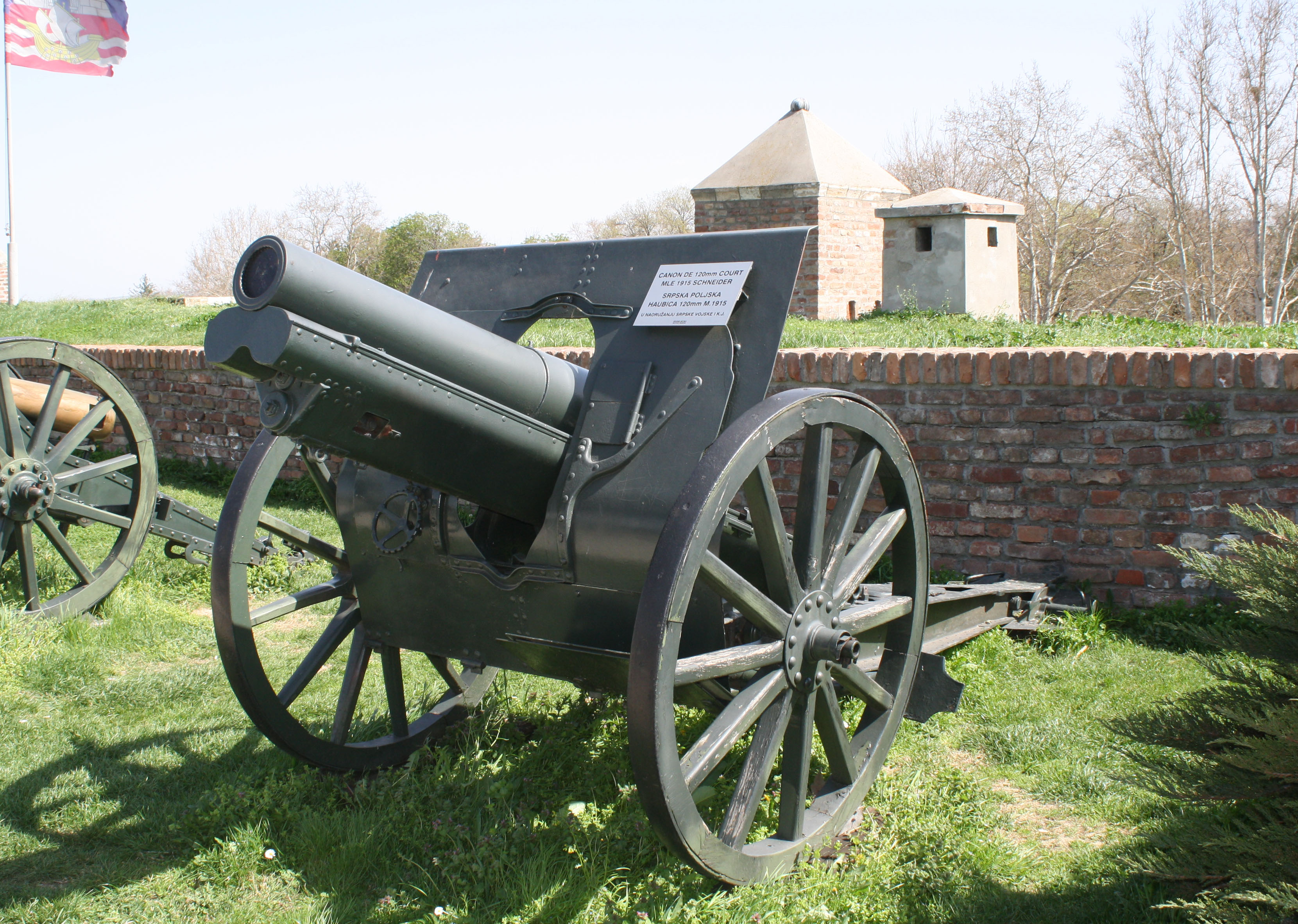
- A Serbian mle 1915 at the Belgrade Military Museum.
- Type: Field howitzer
- Place of origin: France

Service history
- Used by: France; Belgium; Bulgaria; Romania; Serbia
- Wars: World War I

Production history
- Designer: Schneider et Cie
- Designed: 1909
- Manufacturer: Schneider et Cie
- Produced: 1915

Specifications
- Mass: Combat: 1,416 kg (3,122 lb); Travel: 2,228 kg (4,912 lb)
- Barrel length: 1.74 m (5 ft 9 in) L/13
- Width: 1.52 m (5 ft)
- Shell: 120 x 142R Separate loading cased charge and projectile
- Shell weight: HE, Shrapnel, HE fragmentation 21 kg (46 lb)
- Caliber: 120 mm (4.7 in)
- Breech: Interrupted screw
- Recoil: Hydro-pneumatic
- Carriage: Box trail
- Elevation: -3° to +43°
- Traverse: 5°
- Rate of fire: 10 rpm
- Muzzle velocity: 350 m/s (1,100 ft/s)
- Maximum firing range: 8.3 km (5.2 mi)

The Obusier de 120 mm modèle 1915 Tir Rapide or quick loading 120 mm Howitzer Model 1915 was a French howitzer designed and built by the Schneider company and used by a number of nations during the First World War.

== History ==
The origins of the mle 1915 go back to a very similar design the mle 1909. The designation in Schneider's catalog was O.C. 120 Nr2 (Obusier de Campagne de 120) or 120 mm Field Howitzer in English. Its description from 1912 was obice de grande mobilité, très stable au tir, or in English a highly mobile howitzer with very stable firing able to carry out both the direct and the indirect fire missions.

In Russian service the mle 1909 became the 122 mm howitzer M1910. The major difference between the mle 1909 and the M1910 was its modification to fire Russian 122 mm (4.8 in) ammunition. The M1910 was built in large numbers by the Russians at their Putilov factory and served in both world wars.

Schneider also sold the mle 1909 in 120 mm to both Bulgaria and Serbia in 1910-1911. Serbia ordered a second batch in 1912 and after the Balkan Wars Bulgaria also ordered a second batch, but at the outbreak of World War I the French canceled the Bulgarian contract, and in June 1915 the seized howitzers were assigned to French Army's horse-drawn heavy artillery units under the mle 1915 designation. The mle 1909 and mle 1915 were largely identical in specifications and performance. Later in September 1915, the Bulgarians joined the Central Powers and like the earlier Balkan Wars, the mle 1909 and mle 1915 were used by both sides in the conflict.

== Design ==
The mle 1915 was a conventional design for the time with a box trail carriage, two wooden spoked wheels, gun shield, hydro-pneumatic recoil system and an interrupted screw breech. The mle 1915 used separate loading cased charges and projectiles where a metallic cartridge case held up to five bags of propellant which could be varied to control velocity and range.

The box trail carriage had a cut-out section in the middle for high angle fire and at the end of the trail, there was a recoil spade. There was an integral loading tray at the breech to ease ammunition handling and the hydro-pneumatic recoil system was below the gun barrel. The 4 mm thick shield was made of hardened Nickel steel and was composed of three parts. The fixed inner/upper part that attached to the carriage which had an inverted horseshoe shape. The outer/mid part which had two plates attached to the right and left-hand side of the axle which covered the barrel opening. The hinged lower part which was attached to the bottom of the carriage and could be folded backward for travel.

The howitzer was designed to be towed by a six-horse team and a limber and caisson were provided to carry supplies for the gun crew and ammunition. The limber could carry 10 rounds of ammunition while the caisson could carry 24 rounds of ammunition. The gunners were provided with a detachable armored Goerz-Schneider panoramic sight.

== Employment ==
The initial Serbian order for 6 batteries placed in 1910-1911 was later followed by a second order for 2 more batteries during 1912. The Bulgarians after the Balkan Wars ordered 11 batteries and these were seized by the French at the outbreak of the first world war. Of these 6 batteries were diverted to the Serbian Army while the remaining 5 batteries were assigned to the French Army. The 1er group of the 103e RAHL was composed of three batteries from November 1915 to 1918, when they were replaced with the Canon de 105 mle 1913 Schneider. The remaining two batteries were assigned to the 3e group of the 117e RAHL, which only kept its howitzers from April until August 1916. Later these were assigned to the Armée d’Orient and delivered to the Serbian Army. An unknown number were given to Romania, while Belgium received 22 howitzers which they called Ob. 120 S.
