= 122 mm howitzer M1909 =

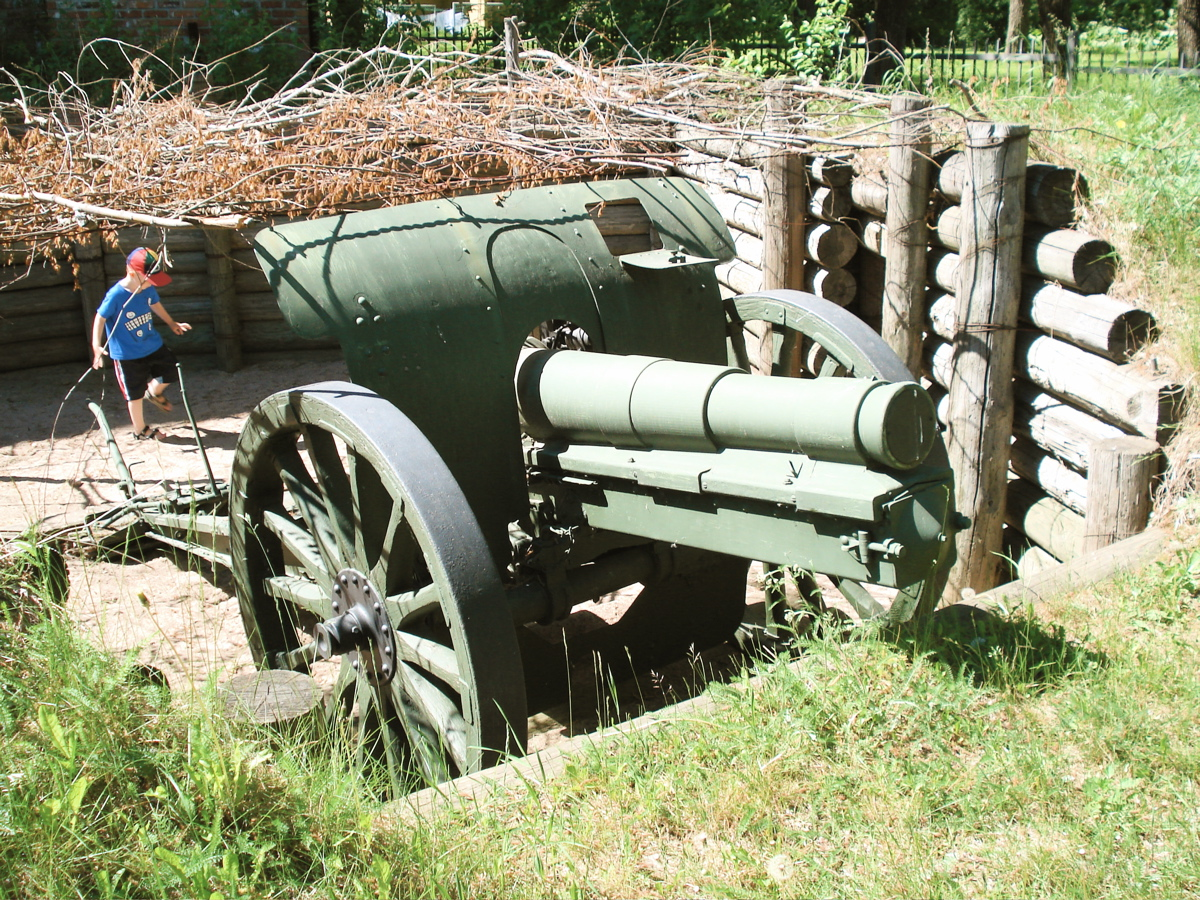
- Soviet 122 mm howitzer Model 1909, at the Hämeenlinna Artillery Museum.
- Type: Field howitzer
- Place of origin: Russian Empire

Service history
- Used by: Russian Empire; Soviet Union; Finland
- Wars: World War I Russian Civil War; Winter War

Production history
- Designer: Krupp
- Designed: 1909

Specifications
- Mass: 1,340 kg (2,950 lb)
- Barrel length: overall:1.69 m (5 ft 7 in) L/14
- Shell: 122 x 159mmR; Separate loading charge and projectile
- Shell weight: 22.8 kg (50 lb)
- Caliber: 121.92 mm (4.8 in)
- Breech: Horizontal sliding-block
- Recoil: Hydro-spring
- Carriage: Box trail
- Elevation: -1° to 43°
- Traverse: 4°
- Muzzle velocity: 335 m/s (1,100 ft/s)
- Maximum firing range: 7.6 km (4.7 mi)

The 122 mm howitzer M1909 (Russian: 122-мм гаубица обр. 1909 гг.) was a Russian 121.92 mm (4.8 inch) howitzer used throughout World War I.

Following the defeats of the Russo-Japanese War, Russia sought to modernize some of its equipment, which included the purchase of foreign designed artillery. Seeking new systems from both France and Germany, the 122 mm howitzer M1909 was developed by the German arms manufacturer Krupp. Russia also bought a very similar system from the French arms manufacturer Schneider et Cie, the 122 mm howitzer M1910.

It was later updated by the Soviet Union as the 122 mm howitzer M1909/37 which saw combat in the German-Soviet War.

== Weapons of comparable role, performance and era ==
- 122 mm howitzer M1910 - very similar piece in Russian service designed by Schneider et Cie
- QF 4.5-inch howitzer - British equivalent, in Russian service also
- 10.5 cm Feldhaubitze 98/09 - early German equivalent
- 10.5 cm leFH 16 - later German equivalent
- 10 cm M. 14 Feldhaubitze - Austro-Hungarian equivalent
