= QF 4.5-inch howitzer =

Ordnance QF 4.5-inch howitzer
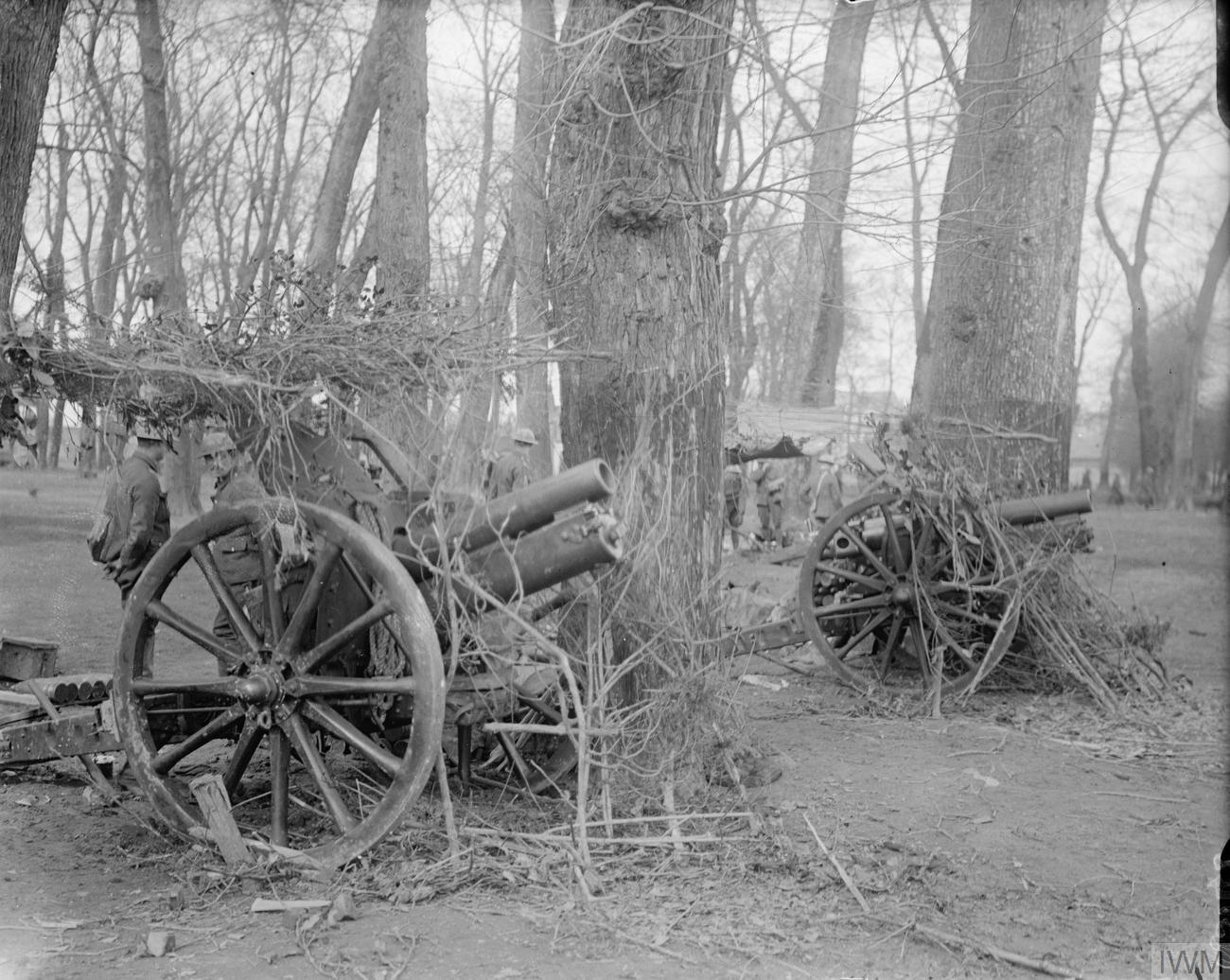
- Camouflaged British 4.5 inch field howitzers at Arras, April 1917
- Type: Field howitzer
- Place of origin: United Kingdom

Service history
- In service: 1908–1944
- Used by: British Empire; Russian Empire; Finland; Estonia; Ireland; Portugal; Romania
- Wars: First World War, Second World War

Production history
- Designer: Coventry Ordnance Works
- Manufacturer: Coventry Ordnance Works, Royal Arsenal, Vickers, Bethlehem Steel
- No. built: 3,359

Specifications (Mk1 & Mk2)
- Mass: Barrel & breech: 972 lb (441 kg); Total: 3,010 lb (1,370 kg)
- Length: 9 ft (2.7 m)
- Barrel length: Bore: 5 ft (1.5 m); Total: 5 ft 10 in (1.78 m)
- Width: 6 ft 3.5 in (1.918 m)
- Crew: 6
- Shell: 114 x73-86 mm R separate QF. HE shell 16 kg (35 lb)
- Calibre: 4.5 in (114.3 mm)
- Breech: Horizontal sliding-block
- Recoil: Hydro-spring; 43.5 in (1.10 m) at 0° of elevation; 15.2 in (0.39 m) at 45° of elevation
- Carriage: Wheeled, box trail
- Elevation: -5° to +45°
- Traverse: 3° right and left
- Rate of fire: 4 rounds per minute
- Muzzle velocity: Maximum: 1,012 ft/s (308 m/s)
- Effective firing range: 6,600 yd (6,000 m)
- Maximum firing range: 6,800 yd (6,200 m)
- Sights: Reciprocating & non-calibrating

The Ordnance QF 4.5-inch howitzer was the standard British Empire field (or "light") howitzer of the First World War era. It replaced the BL 5-inch howitzer and equipped some 25% of the field artillery. It entered service in 1910 and remained in service through the interwar period and was last used in the field by British forces in early 1942. It was generally horse drawn until mechanisation in the 1930s.

The QF 4.5-inch (114 mm) howitzer was used by British and Commonwealth forces in most theatres, by Russia and by British troops in Russia in 1919. Its calibre and shell weight were greater than those of the equivalent German 105 mm field howitzer. France did not have an equivalent artillery piece. In the Second World War, it equipped some units of the British Expeditionary Force in France and British, Australian, New Zealand and South African batteries in East Africa and the Middle East and Far East.

== History ==
=== Origin and use ===
During the Second Boer War (1899–1902), the British government realised its field artillery was being overtaken by the more modern "quick firing" guns and howitzers of other major powers. The Krupp field howitzers used by the Boers had particularly impressed the British. The usefulness of field howitzers and the need for them to form part of an infantry division's artillery were reinforced by reports from the Russo-Japanese War in 1904. In 1900, the British Cabinet ordered Field Marshal Lord Roberts, the commander-in-chief in South Africa, to send home artillery brigade and battery commanders "selected for their eminence and experience" to form an equipment committee. It was formed in January 1901 with wide-ranging terms of reference concerning artillery equipment from guns and howitzers to harness design and instruments. It was chaired by General Sir George Marshall, who had been artillery commander in South Africa.

The committee swiftly established requirements and invited proposals from British gun makers. None were satisfactory, and all compared poorly with a captured Krupp 12 cm howitzer. A purchase of Krupp howitzers was discussed, including visits to Essen. However, by 1905, the committee was sufficiently satisfied to recommend the production of trial equipments from ordnance factories, Armstrong, Vickers and the Coventry Ordnance Works (a joint venture by several Coventry engineering companies). Testing in 1906 showed the Coventry design was by far the most satisfactory and a battery's worth were ordered for trials. In 1908, after trials, the 4.5-inch howitzer was recommended for service, albeit with a shortened barrel.

The 4.5-inch howitzer was used on most fronts during the First World War. On the Western Front, its normal scale was one battery to every three batteries of 18-pounder field guns. Initially, 4.5-inch howitzers equipped a howitzer brigade of the Royal Field Artillery (RFA) in each infantry division. In the original British Expeditionary Force in 1914, this brigade had three batteries each with six howitzers. Subsequent batteries had only four howitzers. In 1916, all batteries on the Western Front began to be increased to six howitzers and, later that year, the howitzer brigades were disbanded and a howitzer battery added to each RFA field brigade as the fourth battery. This organisation continued between the wars.

The weapon remained in service during the inter-war period and was used in various campaigns. Apart from changes to its ammunition, the howitzer itself remained unchanged except for carriage modifications to enable mechanisation.

During the Second World War, they served with the British Expeditionary Force in France. Although many were lost, they were the most widely available artillery piece until QF 25-pounder gun-howitzer production developed. They were used in the Middle East and Far East theatres as well as for training. They were gradually replaced by the 25-pounder.

== Description ==
=== Features ===
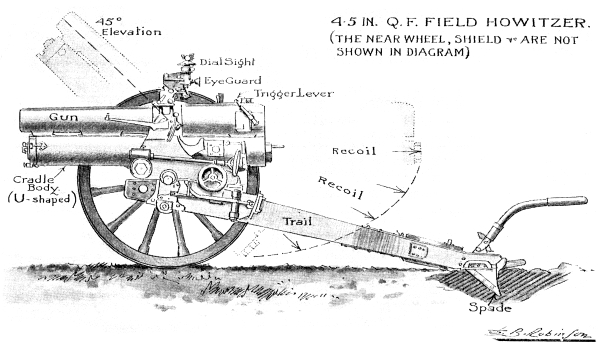
Diagram of 4.5-inch howitzer

QF stands for "quick firing", a British term for ordnance that fires ammunition with a metal (usually brass) cartridge case containing the propellant charge. The cartridge case also provides obturation (sealing of the chamber). This howitzer was the largest calibre of British QF field artillery ordnance.

Apart from extensive experimentation with shell and rifling designs, two problems slowed development; both were howitzer-specific issues. The first was the need for an adjustable quick firing recoil system to prevent the breech striking the ground when fired at high elevation angles. The second was the suitable design for a range scale in yards able to accommodate a choice of propelling charges. The first was solved by use of a "cut-off gear" that allowed 40 in (1.0 m) of recoil when the barrel was horizontal but only 20 in (0.51 m) when it was at 45 degrees of elevation. The second led to the range scale being designed for charge four and a "range rule" provided to convert the actual range for other charges to a false range set on the charge four scale.

The gun carriage was designed to be towed behind a limber and six horses; the lower carriage comprised a box trail. The QF 4.5 fired a separate round (i.e. shell and cartridge were loaded separately). The barrel was of built-up type, with a horizontal sliding-block breech. A limited traverse saddle supported the elevating mass and a shield. It was designed for one-man laying with both traverse and elevation controls and sights on the left. The recoil system was below the barrel and used a hydraulic buffer with a hydro-pneumatic recuperator to return the barrel to its firing position.

Originally fitted with rocking bar open sights including a deflection scale and a strip elevation, by 1914 the Number 7 dial sight in Carrier Number 7 Dial Sight Number 1 had been introduced. This carrier was reciprocating (i.e. it could be cross-levelled), it had an integral elevation scale drum and a mounting for the sight clinometer (used for the angle of sight). The Number 7 dial sight was a modified version of the German Goertz panoramic sight. The only changes to the ordnance, creating the Mark II in 1917, had a reduced twist in the rifling (from 1:15 to 1:20) and changes to correct design defects in the breech to reduce the effect of firing stresses.

From the 1920s, the carriage was upgraded; first to Mk 1R (solid rubber tyres) then to Mks 1P or 1PA (new wheels, axles, brakes and pneumatic tyres) for vehicle towing. The Mk 1P was a British conversion which involved cutting off the ends of the axle and fitting a new axle beneath the carriage which utilized 9.00 X 16 tyres. The Mk 1PA was the American Martin-Parry (Buquor) conversion in which "drop down" stub axles were fitted, secured by means of sleeves fitted over the ends of the original axles. These had larger 7.50 X 24 tyres. The No. 26 artillery trailer was similarly converted. Unlike most other guns and howitzers in British service, calibrating Probert sights were not fitted to the 4.5-inch howitzer.

=== Production ===
By the outbreak of war in 1914, 192 guns had been produced, 39 being for Imperial forces, which was less than ordered. Coventry Ordnance Works was the main supplier, with the Royal Ordnance Factory Woolwich producing substantial numbers. Other suppliers of complete equipments were Bethlehem Steel in the US and, before the outbreak of war, a small number from Vickers. The Austin Motor Company produced some carriages. Total wartime production was 3,384 guns (i.e. barrels) and 3,437 carriages.

== Combat service ==
=== British Empire service ===
==== First World War ====
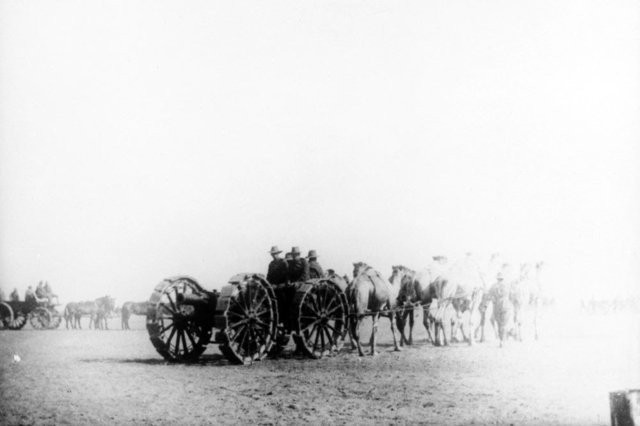
Gun with sand tyres around wheels, towed by camels, Egypt circa 1915–1916

The QF 4.5 served throughout the Great War, principally with the Royal Field Artillery, beginning with 182 guns in 1914, with 3,177 more produced during the war.

At the beginning of the First World War, a brigade of three six-gun howitzer batteries was part of each British infantry division. In February 1917, divisional artillery batteries were consolidated into two field brigades each with three batteries (A, B, C) of 18-pounder guns and one battery (D) of 4.5-inch howitzers. The surplus batteries were formed into army field brigades with the same organisation.

Following experience gained in the Battle of the Somme in the summer of 1916, its role on the Western Front was defined in January 1917 as "neutralising guns with gas shell, for bombarding weaker defences, enfilading communications trenches, for barrage work, especially at night, and for wire cutting in such places which the field guns could not reach".

During advances such as at the Battle of Messines in June 1917, the gun was typically employed in "standing barrages" of HE on the enemy forward positions ahead of the 18-pounders' creeping barrage, and gas shelling following bombardments.

There were 984 pieces in service on the Western Front at the Armistice, where 25,326,276 rounds had been fired by them, and over 230 howitzers were in Egypt, Russia and other fronts.

The 4.5-inch howitzers were also used by British batteries in the campaigns in Gallipoli, the Balkans, Palestine, Italy and Mesopotamia.

A section (two guns) of D Battery, 276 Brigade RFA held off a German counter-attack at Little Priel Farm, southeast of Epéhy, during the Battle of Cambrai on 30 November 1917. Sergeant Cyril Gourley MM was awarded the Victoria Cross for "most conspicuous bravery when in command of a section of howitzers" and saving the guns from the enemy.

==== Between the wars ====
Several batteries of 4.5-inch howitzers arrived in North Russia shortly before the armistice on the Western Front and remained there through much of 1919.

In 1919, small numbers were used in the Third Anglo-Afghan War, the Waziristan Campaign, and in Mesopotamia from 1920 to 1921 to suppress the Iraqi revolt against the British.

==== Second World War ====
4.5-inch howitzers equipped some batteries of the British Expeditionary Force in France in 1940. Ninety-six were lost, leaving 403 in worldwide service (only 82 outside the UK) with the British Army, plus those held by Australia, Canada, New Zealand and South Africa. The British holdings were expected to increase to 561 by August 1940 due to the completion of reconditioning and repairs. The Germans designated captured British guns as 11.4 cm leFH 361(e) and Russian guns as 11.5 cm leFH 362(r).

4.5-inch howitzers equipped British and Australian batteries in the Western Desert in 1940 and 1941, and Australian units in Syria. Two guns that had decorated the main gate at Habbaniya aerodrome in Iraq were refurbished by the RAF and used by Habforce in the Anglo-Iraqi War in May 1941. The batteries with the 4th and 5th Indian divisions went with them to East Africa and South African batteries with 4.5-inch howitzers also fought in this campaign.

In the Far East in 1941, 4.5-inch howitzers equipped some British and Australian batteries in Malaya, and a troop in each mountain battery in Hong Kong. The 4.5s of the 155th (Lanarkshire Yeomanry) Field Regiment were instrumental in holding back Japanese attacks at the Battle of Kampar, in late December 1941. The last operational use of the 4.5 by the British Army was in early 1942 in Malaya. They were withdrawn from field formations in 1943 and declared obsolete in 1944 when ammunition stocks ran out.

=== Irish service ===
The 4.5-inch howitzer entered Irish service in 1925 to equip the newly formed 3rd Field Battery. Additional equipment received by the Irish Army in 1941 included four 4.5-inch howitzers. In 1943–44, 20 additional 4.5-inch howitzers were received. Thirty-eight 4.5-inch howitzers, all on carriage Mk1PA, were used by the reserve FCA.

The QF 4.5 survived in use with the Irish Army until the 1960s. They were fired by the FCA (An Fórsa Cosanta Áitiúil – local defence force) on the Glen of Imaal firing range, County Wicklow circa 1976. Some retired examples exist today, such as those preserved at Collins Barracks, Cork and two in Aiken Barracks, Dundalk. A further two guns are situated at the Town Hall on Main Street, Templemore, as part of a WW1 commemoration/3rd Field Artillery Regiment Association Remembrance Project.

=== Finnish service ===
Britain supplied 24 howitzers to Finland for use in the Winter War against USSR of 1939–1940. Finland obtained 30 more from Spain in July 1940 and all guns were used in the Continuation War of 1941–1944. It was designated 114 H/18 in Finnish service. The Finns fitted a perforated cylindrical muzzle brake. Some of the guns were used in the BT-42 self-propelled artillery piece.

=== Portuguese service ===
The Portuguese Army used the QF 4.5 in combat in the Western Front, during the First World War. The howitzer was received in 1917, to equip the Portuguese Expeditionary Corps (CEP) sent to the Western Front, as part of the Portuguese effort in support to the Allies. In the CEP, the howitzer was designed to equip the fourth battery of each field artillery battalion, the other three batteries being equipped with 75 mm quick firing guns.

In Portugal, the QF 4.5 was officially designated Obus 11,4 cm TR m/1917 and received the nickname "bonifácio". It remained in service until the 1940s.

=== Russia and Romania ===
400 4.5-inch howitzers were supplied to Russia from 1916 to 1917. Of these, 54 were abandoned in Romania after Russia made peace with the Central Powers in 1918. They were put into service by the Romanian Army, equipping the infantry divisions' howitzer regiments from 1918 to 1934.

240 4.5-inch howitzers were supplied to the Armed Forces of South Russia and the Russian Army in 1919 and 1920.

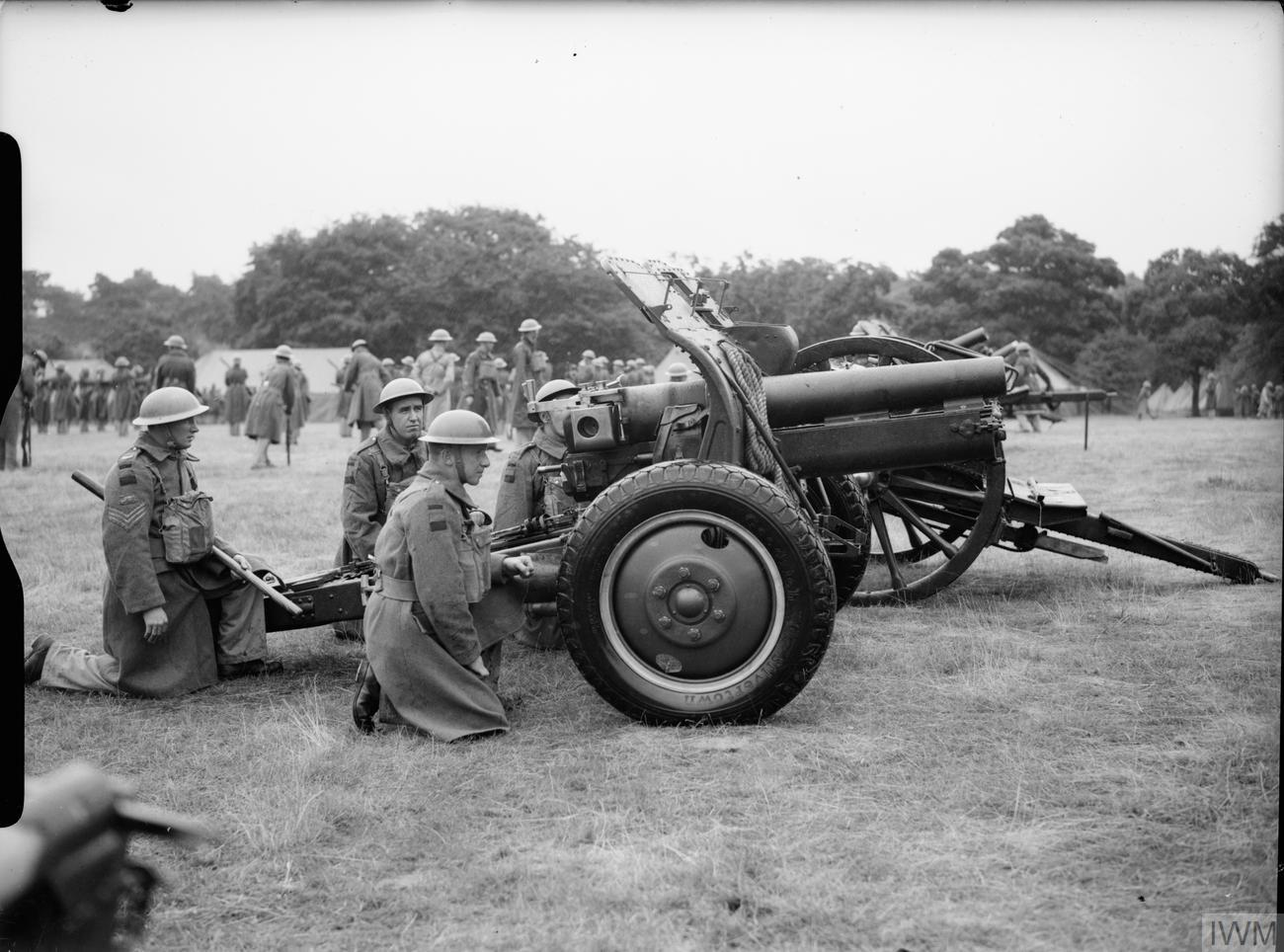
A New Zealand battery in the UK 6 July 1940. The gun carriage (Mk1PA) has the Martin-Parry conversion. The limber is unconverted

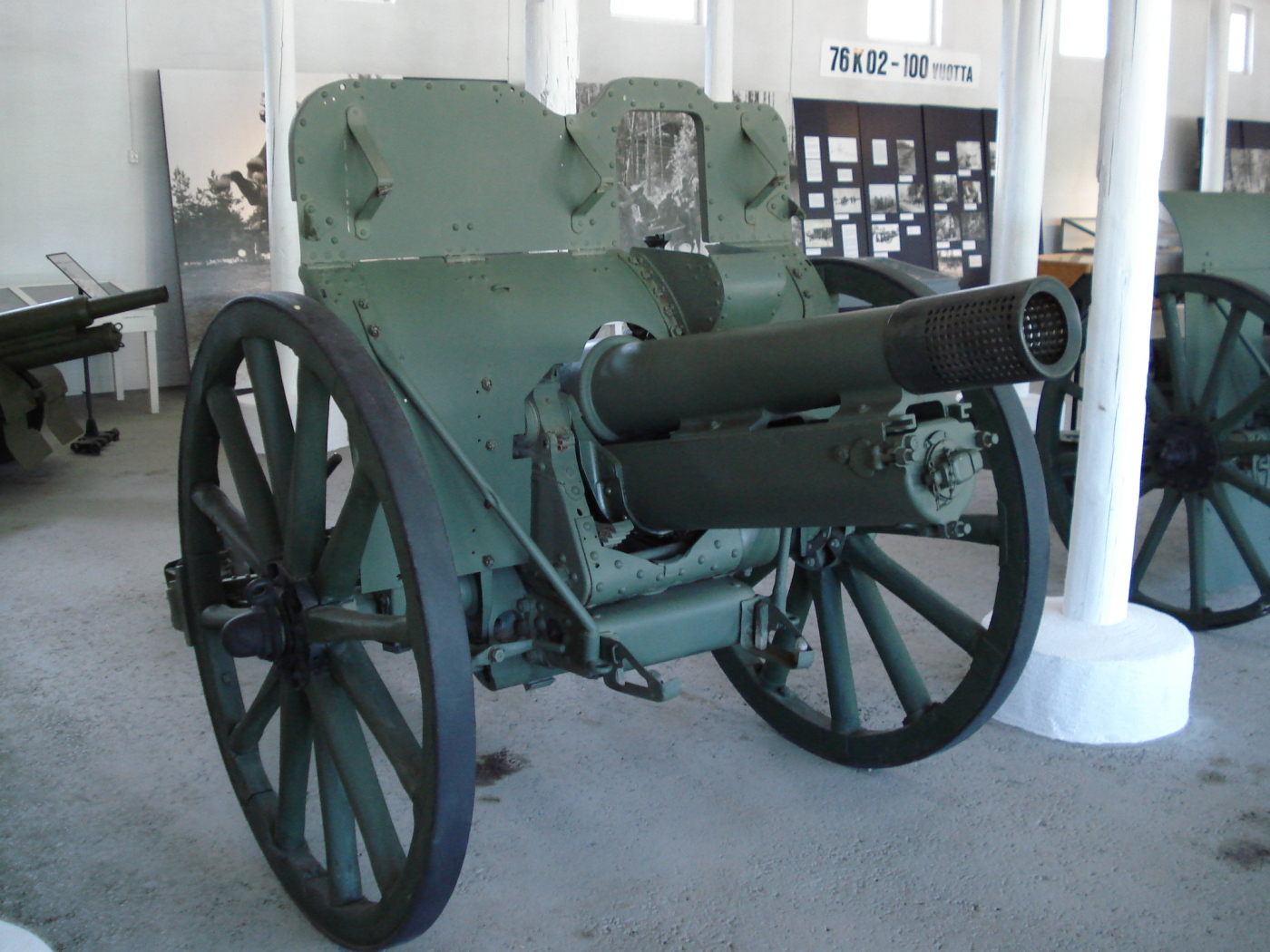
1916 model used by Finland, at the Hämeenlinna Artillery Museum

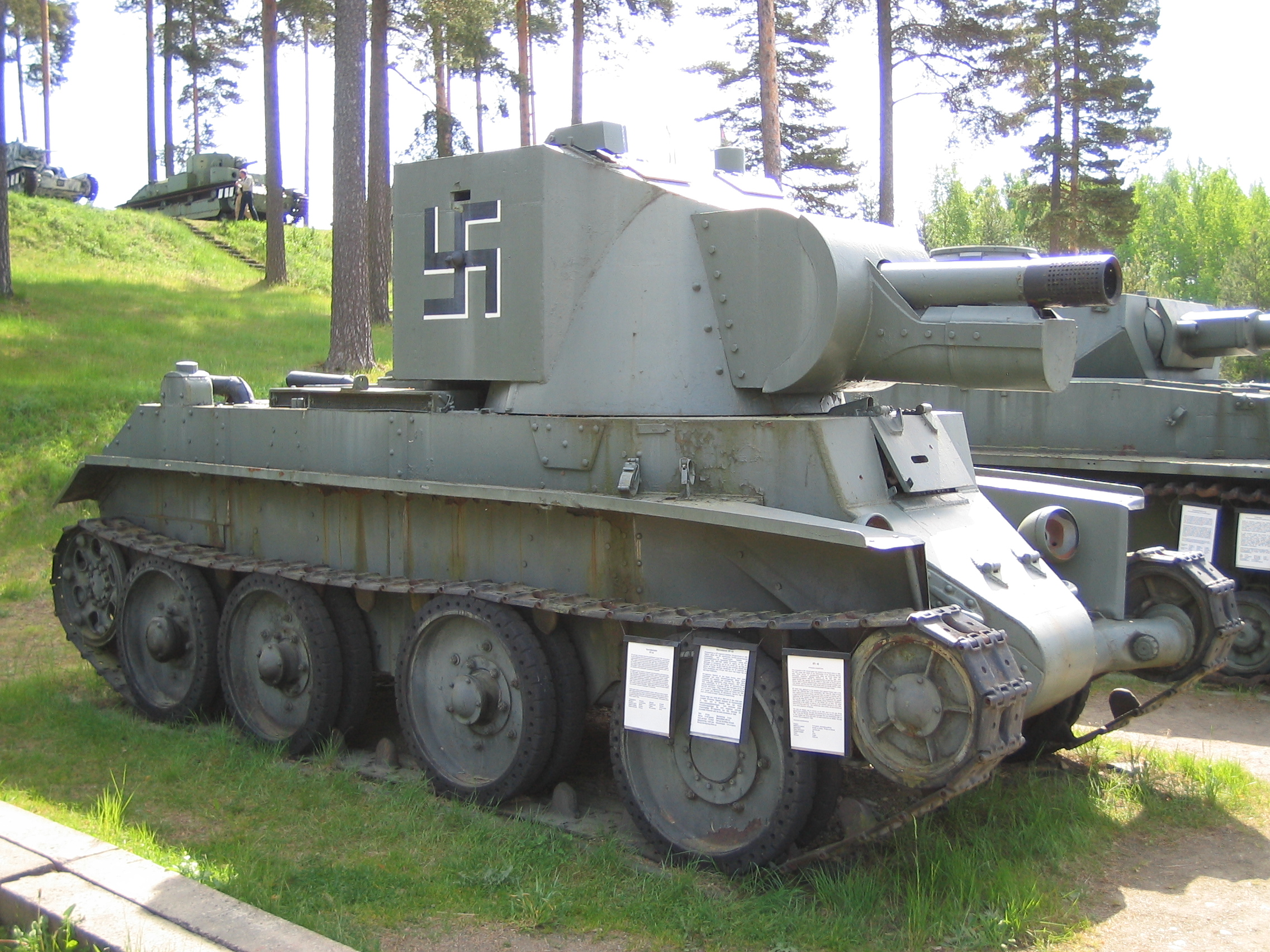
Finnish BT-42 self-propelled gun at Parola Tank Museum, armed with a QF 4.5 inch

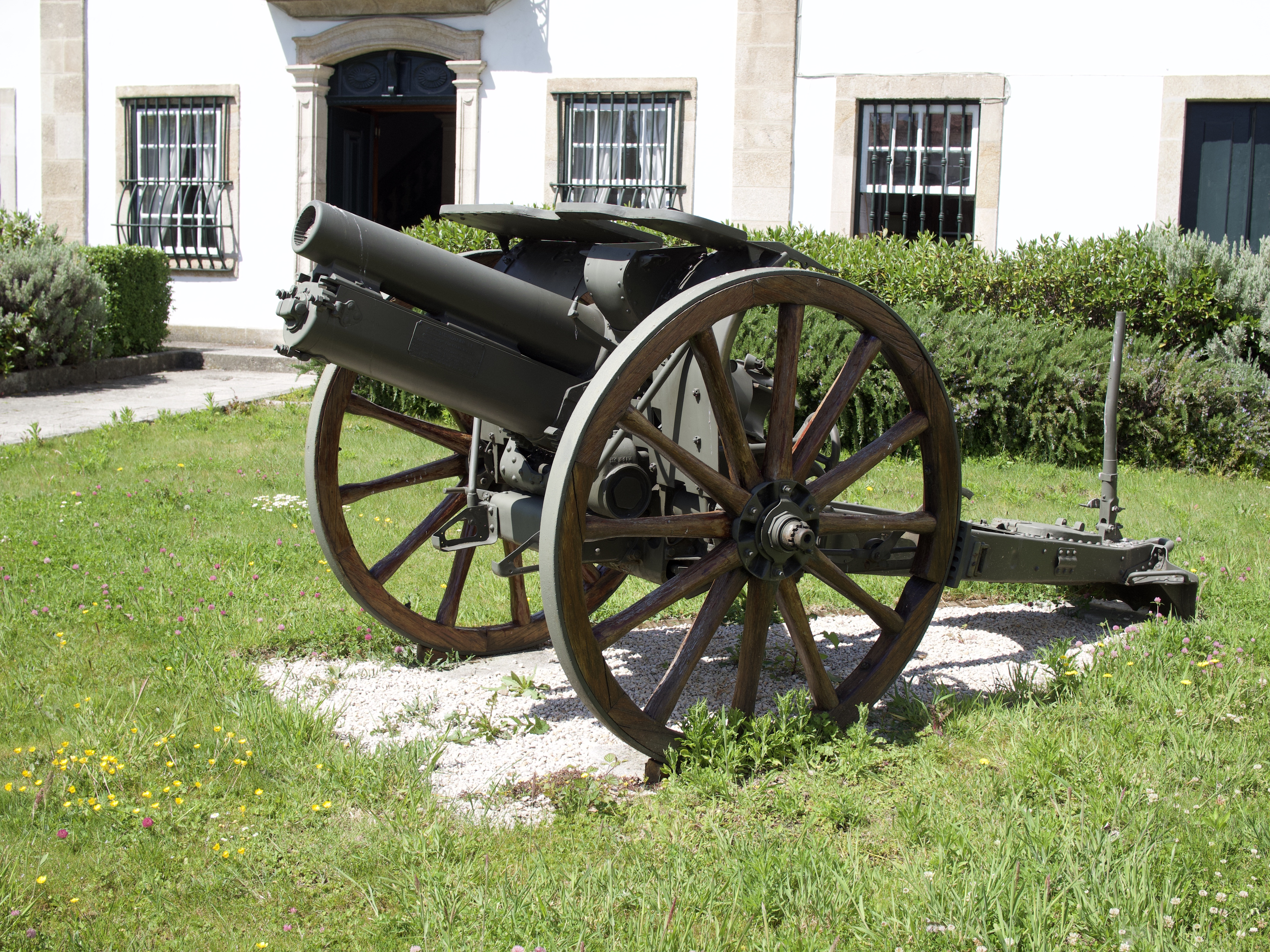
Portuguese World War One 4.5cm howitzer, Lamego, Portugal

== Specification ==
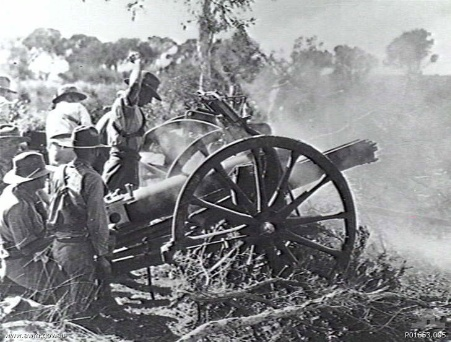
Australian gun seen in recoil position after firing, 1935

Gun

- Overall length: 5 ft 10 in (1.78 m)
- Bore length: 60.11 in (1,527 mm)
- Weight: 972 lb (441 kg) (Mk1), 1,021 lb (463 kg) (Mk2) including breech
- Rifling: PPS 32 grooves
  - Mk 1: 1 in 41.314 calibres increasing to 1 in 14.78 calibres twist
  - Mk 2: 1 in 20 calibres uniform twist
- Breech: horizontal sliding block

Carriage

- Weight: 27 cwt (1,400 kg) total weight
- Width: 6 ft 9 in (2.06 m)
- Recoil: 43.5 in (1,100 mm) at 0° elevation, 15.2 in (390 mm) at 45° elevation
- Elevation: -5° to +45°
- Traverse: 3° right and left

Ammunition

- "Shell HE" Mk 12 to 16 – 4.3 lb (2.0 kg) Amatol or TNT filled. Minor differences between marks
- "Shell smoke bursting" Mk 3 to 11 – white phosphorus filled
- "Shell smoke base ejection" Mk 1 – hexachloroethane-zinc filled
- "Shell star" Mk 3 – star unit and parachute with 'Fuze, Time and Percussion No. 221'
- Shell weight: 35 lb (16 kg)
- Propellant charge: five parts, from 0.4 to 1 lb (0.18 to 0.45 kg) loaded into a 3.4 in (86 mm) long brass case

== Ammunition ==
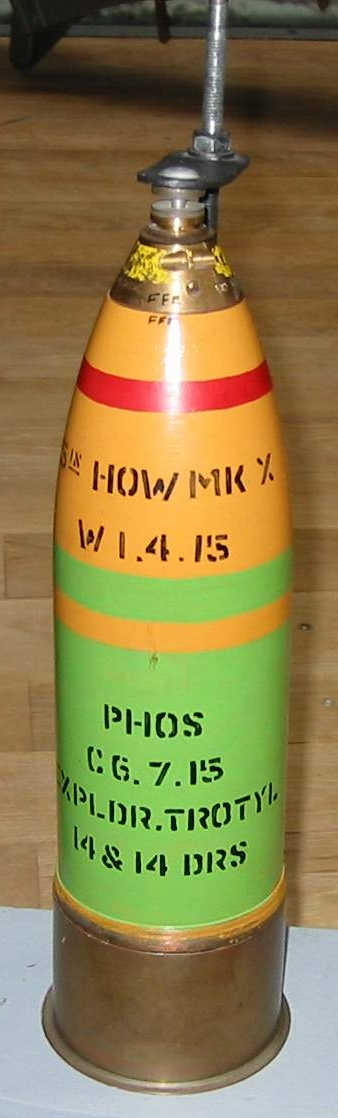
Smoke shell, 1915

The 4.5-in ammunition was separate loading, the shell and cartridge were loaded separately, with charge bags being removed from the cartridge as necessary. The full charge was charge five, i.e. the cartridge case had an irremovable charge (one) and four incremental bags. Shells were delivered fuzed. In 1914, the ammunition scale for 4.5-inch howitzers was 70% shrapnel and 30% HE. New types of shell were introduced during the First World War. These were chemical at the end of 1915, incendiary shells in 1916 and smoke shells in 1917. Smoke shells were phosphorus filled with both steel and cast iron bodies. A new streamlined shell (HE Mk 1D) was also introduced to increase maximum range from 6,000 metres (6,600 yd) of the older three CRH (calibres radius head) models to 6,700 metres (7,300 yd).

Mk I cartridge case showing arrangement of cordite rings around central core. One or more rings were removed for shorter ranges.	No. 82 fuze for shrapnel shell, World War I	No. 101 E fuze for HE shell, World War I	Chemical shell, 1943

== Surviving examples ==
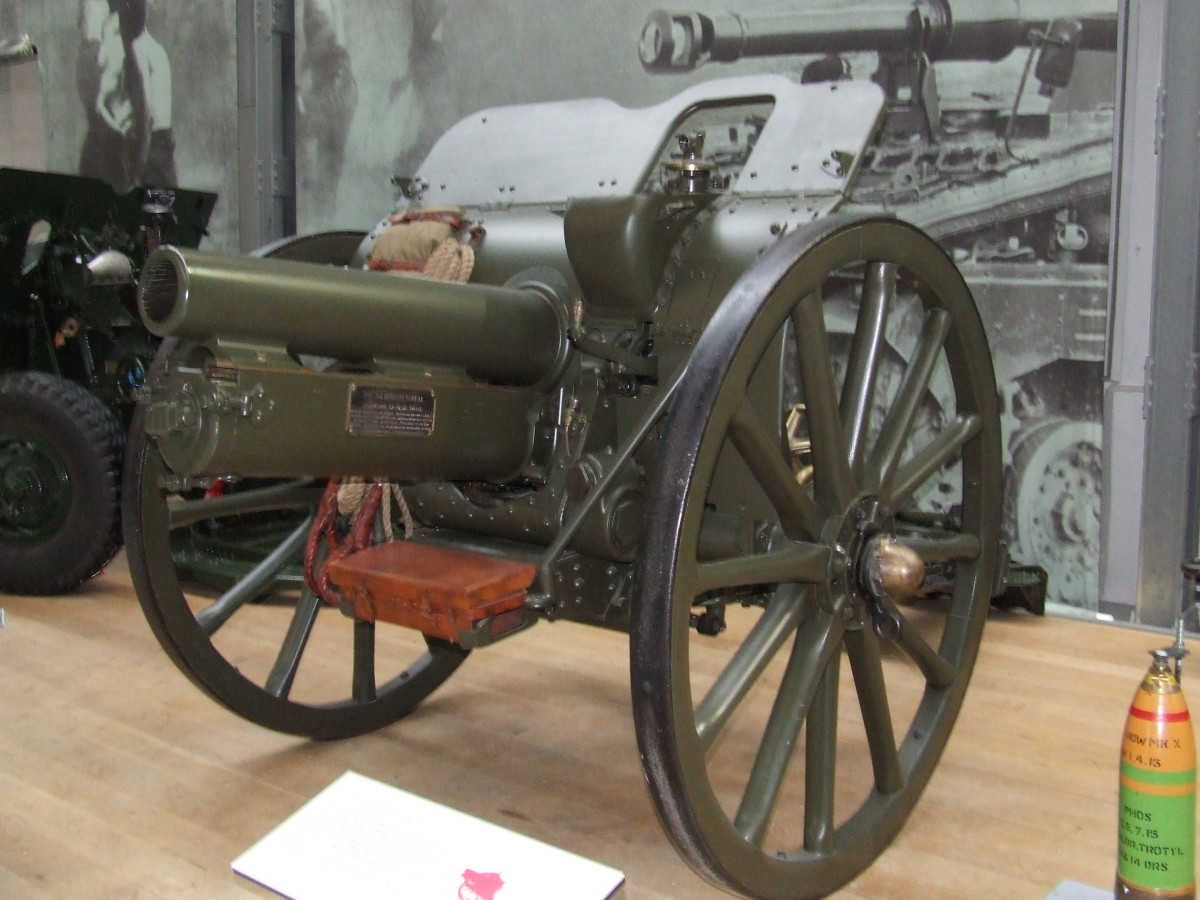
At Firepower – The Royal Artillery Museum, London.

- Firepower – The Royal Artillery Museum, Woolwich, London
- Imperial War Museum, Duxford, UK.
- Artillery Museum, Hämeenlinna, Finland
- Collins Barracks, Cork, Ireland
- Ballincollig Barracks Square, Ireland
- Army Memorial Museum & School of Artillery, Waiouru, New Zealand
- Auckland War Memorial Museum, New Zealand
- Royal Australian Artillery National Museum, North Head, Sydney, Australia (closed 2010)
- The Central Museum of The Royal Regiment of Canadian Artillery, Shilo, Manitoba
- Aiken Barracks, Dundalk, Ireland
- 2nd Bn 15th Field Artillery Regiment HQ, Fort Drum, USA
- Polish Army Museum Warsaw Poland
- Donated by Canadians to Mons Memorial Museum, Belgium.
- National Military Museum, Bucharest, Romania
- National Museum of the Republic of Tatarstan, Kazan, Russia
- Parola Tank Museum, Finland (mounted on BT-42)

== See also ==
- List of howitzers

=== Weapons of comparable role, performance and era ===
- 10.5 cm Feldhaubitze 98/09 Early German equivalent
- 10.5 cm leFH 16 Later German equivalent
- 122 mm howitzer M1909, M1909/37, M1910, M1910/30 Russian equivalents

== Sources ==
- Nigel F. Evans, British Artillery in World War 2. 4.5-Inch Howitzer
- General Sir Martin Farndale, History of the Royal Regiment of Artillery. Western Front 1914–18. London: Royal Artillery Institution, 1986. ISBN 1-870114-05-1
- Headlam, Major-General Sir John (1937) [1931]. The History of the Royal Artillery from the Indian Mutiny to the Great War. Vol. II (1899–1914) (Facsimile reprint by Naval & Military Press, 2005 ed.). Woolwich: Royal Artillery Institution. ISBN 978-1-84574-043-6.
- I.V. Hogg & L.F. Thurston, British Artillery Weapons & Ammunition 1914–1918. London: Ian Allan, 1972. ISBN 0-7110-0381-5
- WL Ruffell, QF 4.5-in Howitzer
- The Third Afghan War 1919 – Official Account, 1926. General Staff Branch, Army Headquarters, India.
- Operations in Waziristan 1919–20, 1923. General Staff Branch, Army Headquarters, India.
