= 122 mm howitzer M1910 =

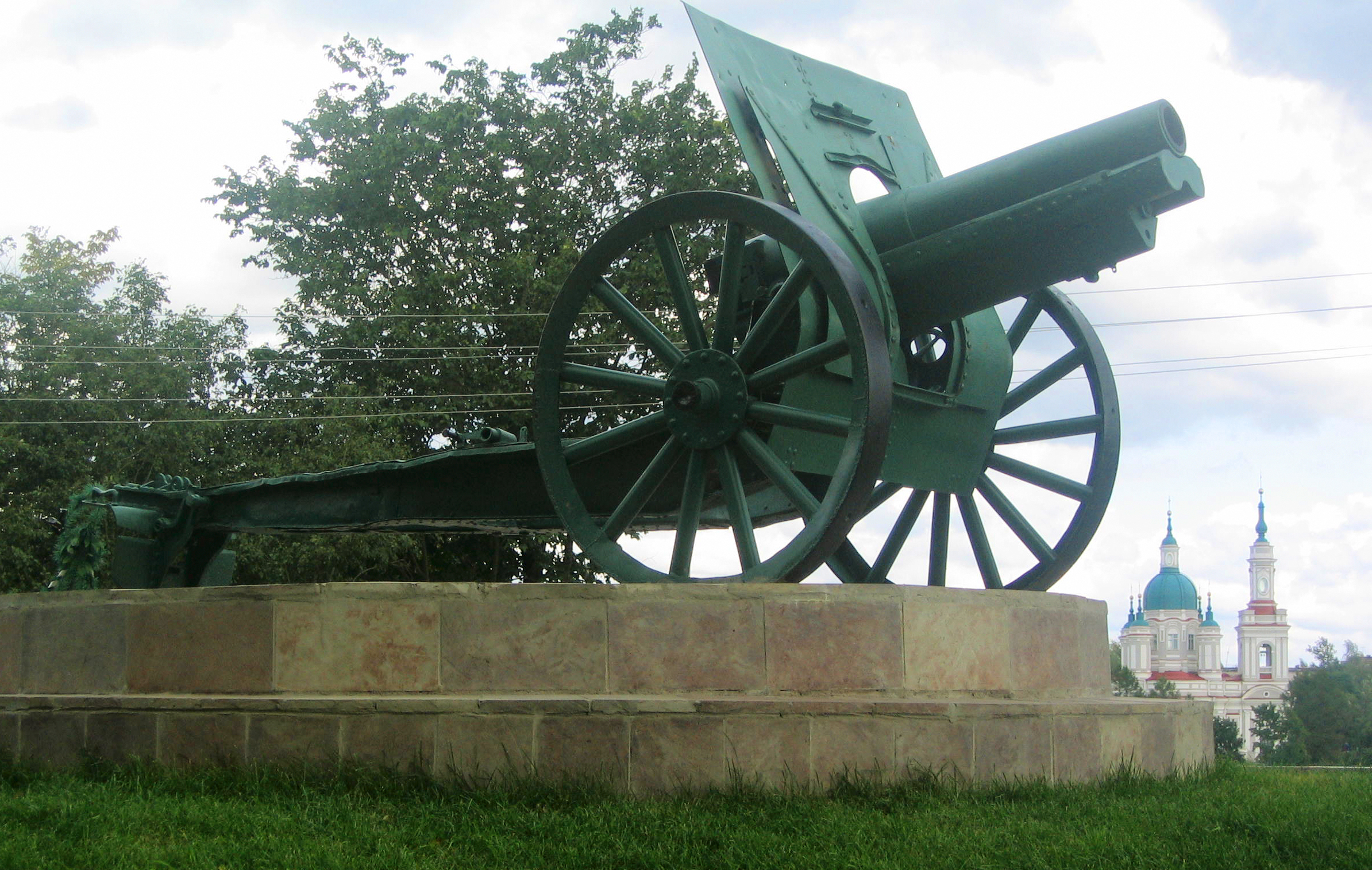
- Type: Field howitzer
- Place of origin: Russian Empire

Service history
- Used by: Russian Empire; Soviet Union; Finland; Romania
- Wars: World War I Russian Civil War; Winter War

Production history
- Designer: Schneider et Cie
- Designed: 1910

Specifications
- Mass: 1,330 kg (2,930 lb)
- Barrel length: 1.56 m (5 ft 1 in) L/12.8
- Shell: 122 x 159mmR; Separate loading charge and projectile
- Shell weight: 22.8 kg (50 lb)
- Caliber: 121.92 mm (4.8 in)
- Breech: Interrupted screw
- Recoil: Hydro-pneumatic
- Carriage: Box trail
- Elevation: -3° to 45°
- Traverse: 4°71́
- Muzzle velocity: 335 m/s (1,100 ft/s)
- Maximum firing range: 7.7 km (4.8 mi)

122 mm howitzer M1910 (Russian: 122-мм гаубица обр. 1910 гг.) was a Russian 121.92 mm (4.8 inch) field howitzer used throughout World War I in large numbers.

Following the defeats of the Russo-Japanese War, Russia sought to modernize some of its equipment, which included the purchase of foreign designed artillery. Seeking new systems from both France and Germany, the 122 mm howitzer M1910 was developed by the French arms manufacturer Schneider et Cie. Russia also bought a very similar system from the German arms manufacturer Krupp, the 122 mm howitzer M1909.

125 pieces were abandoned in Romania after Russia made peace with the Central Powers in 1918. They were put into service by the Romanian Army, in the period 1918-1939.

Up to 5,900 pieces were later converted by the Soviet Union into the 122 mm howitzer M1910/30, the most numerous divisional howitzer of the RKKA at the outbreak of Great Patriotic War, it saw service throughout the war.

== Weapons of comparable role, performance and era ==
- Obusier de 120 mm mle 15TR - The original French gun the M1910 was based on
- 122 mm howitzer M1909 - very similar piece in Russian service designed by Krupp
- QF 4.5-inch howitzer - British equivalent, also in Russian service
- 10.5 cm Feldhaubitze 98/09 - early German equivalent
- 10.5 cm leFH 16 - later German equivalent
