= 122 mm howitzer M1910/30 =

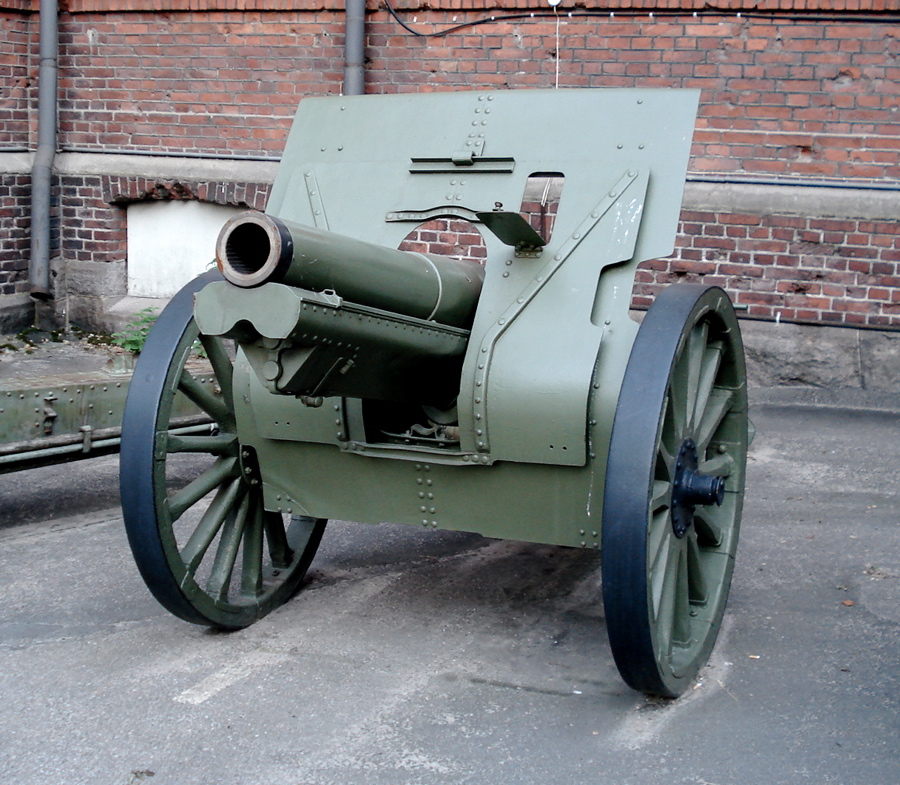
- 122-mm howitzer M1910/30 in the Military Museum of Finland, Helsinki
- Type: field howitzer
- Place of origin: Soviet Union

Production history
- Produced: 1930–1941
- No. built: up to 5,900

Specifications
- Mass: Combat: 1,466 kg (3,232 lbs); Travel: 2,510 kg (5,534 lbs)
- Barrel length: 1.56 m (5 ft 1 in) L/12.8
- Height: 1.841 m (6 ft)
- Crew: 7
- Shell: 122 x 261mmR
- Caliber: 121.92 mm (4.8 in)
- Breech: Interrupted screw
- Recoil: Hydro-pneumatic
- Carriage: Box trail
- Elevation: −3° to 45°
- Traverse: 4°71́
- Rate of fire: 5–6 rounds per minute

122 mm howitzer M1910/30 (Russian: 122-мм гаубица обр. 1910/30 гг.) was a Soviet 121.92 mm (4.8 inch) howitzer, a modernization of World War I era 122 mm howitzer M1910. It was the most numerous divisional howitzer of the RKKA at the outbreak of Great Patriotic War and remained in service throughout the war.

== Development and production history ==
The gun resulted from a modernization of the Russian 122 mm howitzer M1910, initially developed by Schneider Electric. The M1910 was employed by the Imperial Russian Army during World War I and remained in service after the revolution.

In late 1920s the RKKA decided to upgrade the M1910. The modernization, handled by Perm Plant in 1930, included:

- Lengthening of the chamber by one caliber
- New sights
- Strengthened carriage
- Strengthened elevation mechanism
- Minor upgrade of the recoil mechanism

The resulting gun was adopted as 122-mm howitzer M1910/30. The exact production statistics exist only for years 1937 to 1941 when the production stopped. During that period Perm Plant produced 3,395 pieces. In addition, 762 old M1910 guns were upgraded to the M1910/30 standard.

The M1910/30 was a typical short-barrel howitzer, intended mostly for shooting with elevations from +20° to +45°. Shell could be fired with six propellant loads (no. 1 to 5 and full), but when shooting with elevation smaller than +20° with full propellant load, the gun was prone to turning over. The gun had interrupted screw breechblock; hydraulic recoil buffer and hydro-pneumatic recuperator were both mounted under the barrel. The carriage was of single trail type with unsprung wooden wheels (from 1936 some guns received steel wheels with cast rubber tires) and limited traverse.

== Organization and employment ==
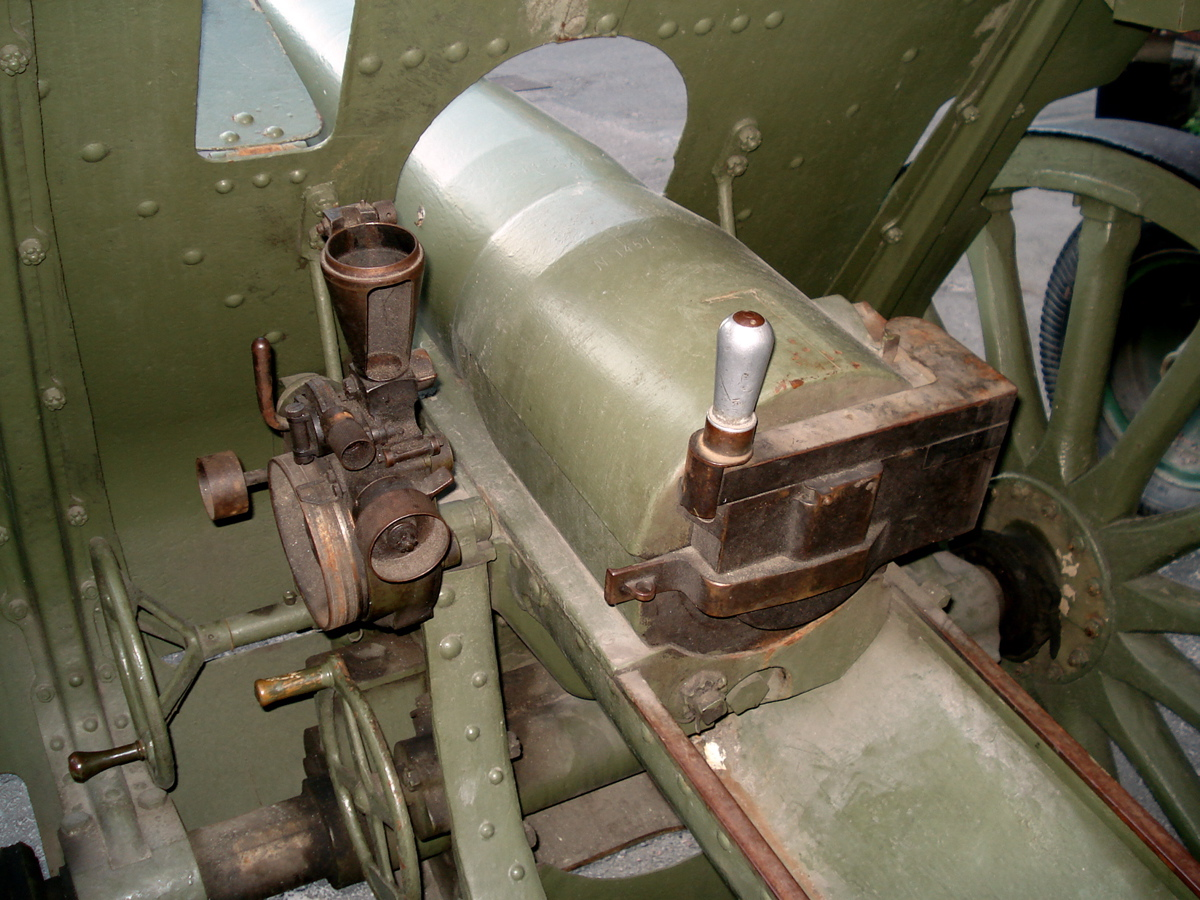
M1910/30 in Military Museum of Finland, Helsinki.

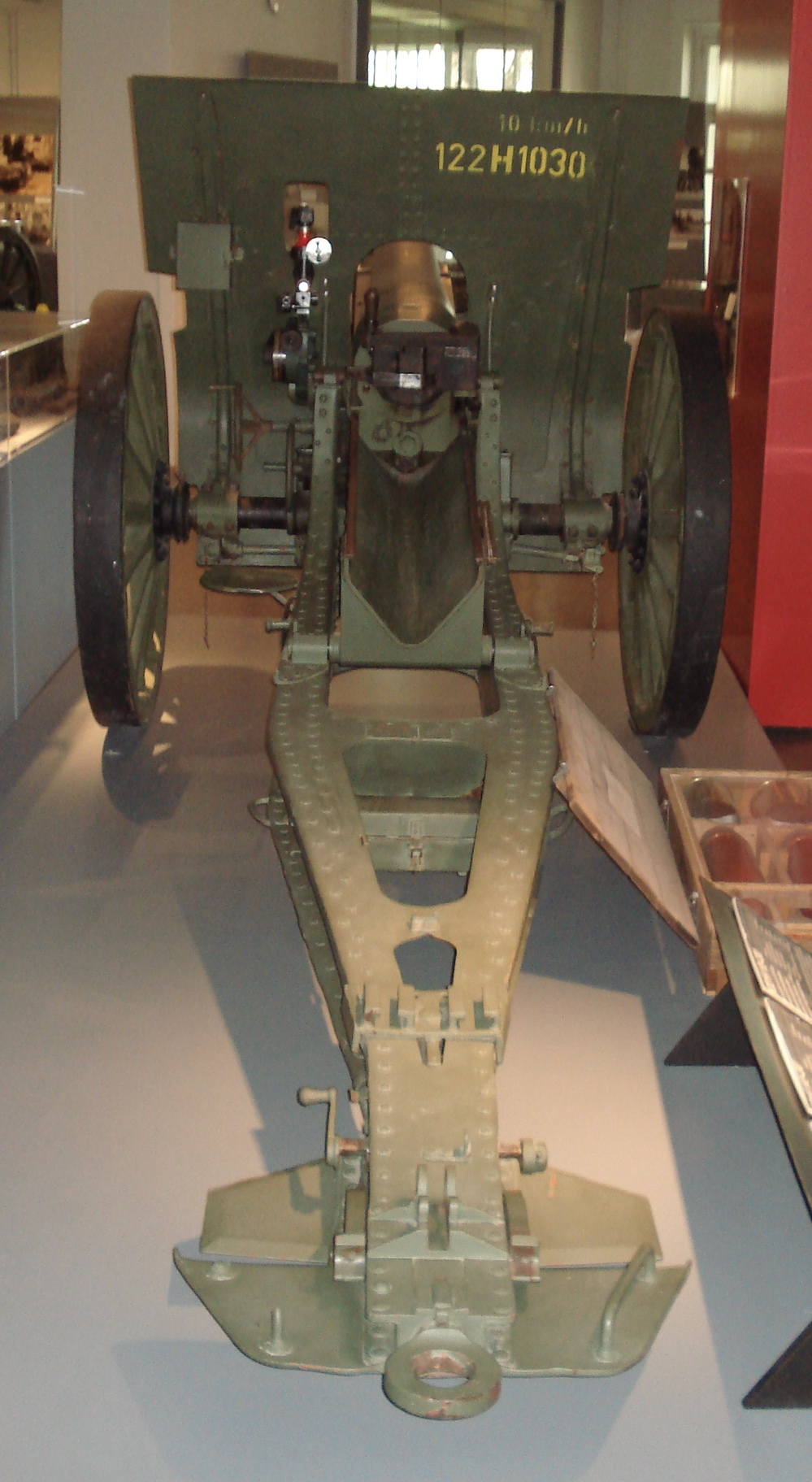
M1910/30 in the Artillery Museum of Finland.

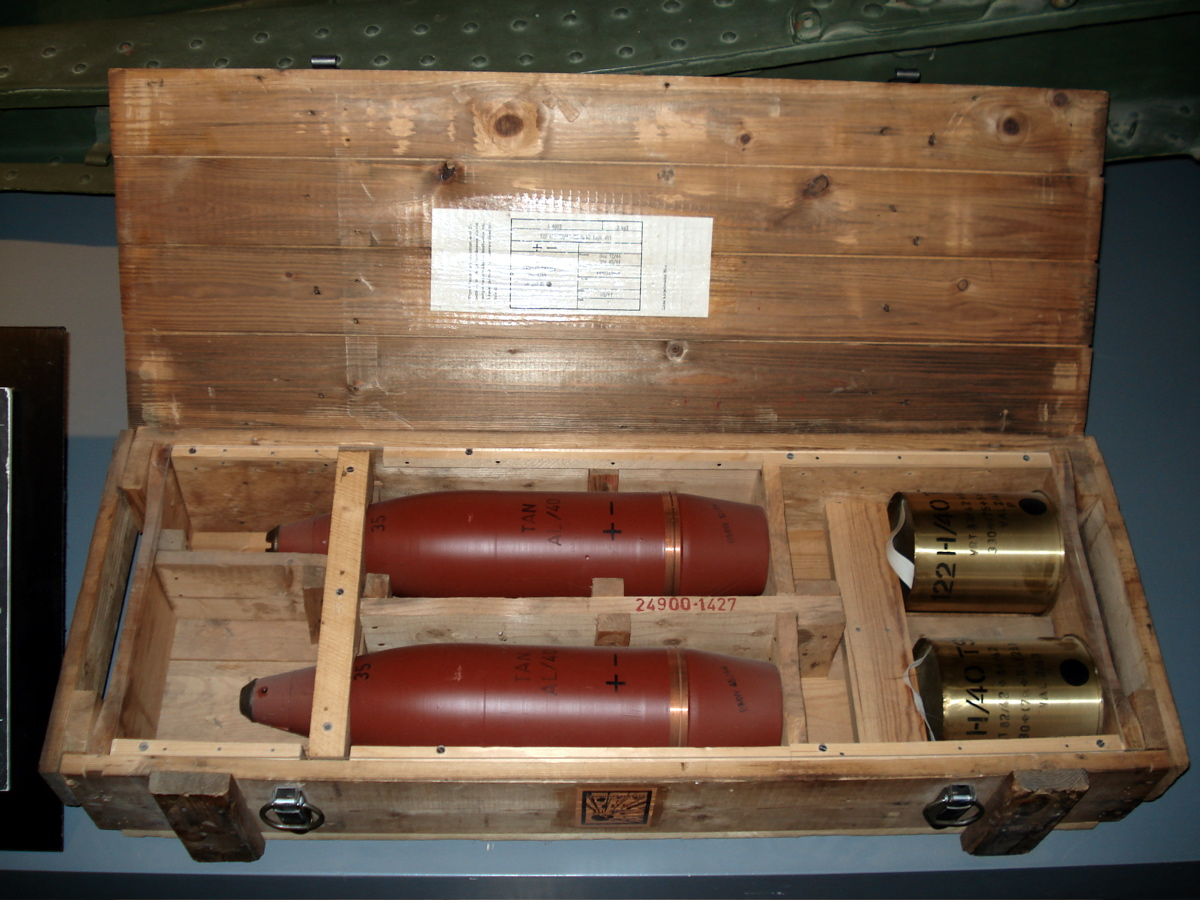
Ammunition for the M1910/30 in The Artillery Museum of Finland, in Hämeenlinna.

=== Red Army ===
The M1910/30 was a divisional level howitzer. According to the organization of 1939, each rifle division had two artillery regiments – light regiment (a battalion of 76 mm guns; two mixed battalions with one battery of 76 mm guns and two batteries of 122 mm howitzers) and howitzer regiment (a battalion of 122 mm howitzers and a battalion of 152 mm howitzers), giving 28 122 mm howitzers per division. In June 1940 one more battalion of 122 mm howitzers was added to the howitzers regiment, bringing the number to 32. In June 1941 the howitzers regiment was removed and the number of howitzers dropped to 16. This organization was used throughout the war, except in guard rifle divisions which from December 1942 had three artillery battalions (two batteries of 76 mm guns and one battery of 122 mm howitzers each), totaling 12 howitzers. From December 1944 they received howitzer regiment (5 batteries, 20 howitzers). From June 1945 rifle divisions were reorganized identically.

Mountain rifle divisions in 1939–40 had one battalion of 122 mm howitzers (3 batteries, 9 guns). From 1941 they received instead one artillery regiment (2 battalions, each from 3 four-gun batteries) with 24 howitzers. From early 1942 only one battalion (2 batteries, 8 howitzers) remained. From 1944 howitzers were removed from mountain rifle divisions.

Motorized divisions had two mixed battalions (battery of 76 mm guns, two batteries of 122 mm howitzers), totaling 12 howitzers. Tank division had one battalion with 12 howitzers. Cavalry divisions until August 1941 had two batteries of 122 mm howitzers, totaling 8, then the divisional artillery was removed.

Until late 1941 rifle brigades had a battery of four 122 mm howitzers.

122 mm howitzers were also used by the howitzer brigades of the Reserve of the Main Command (72–84 pieces).

From 1930 the M1910/30 started to replace the M1910. By 1936 only 44 M1910 remained in service, of which only two were operational. The howitzer saw action in all pre-World War II conflicts of the Soviet Union, notably in the Battle of Khalkhin Gol and in the Winter War. From 1940 onward the M1910/30 was in turn being replaced by the M-30 122 mm howitzer, but in 1941 it was still the most numerous divisional howitzer of the RKKA. By 1 June 1941 more than 5,500 were in service compared to 1,667 M-30s. It continued to serve in significant numbers for the duration of World War II, however from 1942 on its share in the RKKA dropped significantly due to combat losses and mass production of the M-30.

The M1910/30 was also mounted on the T-26 light tank chassis to create the SU-5 self-propelled gun – the only Soviet pre-war self-propelled gun adopted by the RKKA. On 1 June 1941 the army possessed 28 of these.

=== Other operators ===
Hundreds of M1910/30s fell into the hands of the Wehrmacht in 1941–42 and were adopted as 12,2 cm le.F.H.388(r). Germans opened mass production of 122-mm ammunition for the howitzer, producing 424,000 shells in 1943, 696,700 in 1944 and 133,000 in 1945.

The Finnish Army captured about 30 guns of the type in the Winter War and a further 145 in the Continuation War. An additional 72 were purchased from Germany in 1944. In Finnish service the gun was designated 122 H/10-30. According to Finnish sources, these guns fired 369,744 shells in combat against the Soviet Union; 20 pieces were lost. The howitzer remained in service for some time after the war. It was generally liked by the crews, but its recoil mechanism was considered weak. The Finns also modernized in a similar way most of the 40 M1910s they possessed since the Civil War, resulting in a gun designated 122 H/10-40. The guns were used in the Continuation War; a few were lost.

By 1943, Axis-aligned Romania had captured 477 Soviet guns and howitzers of 122 mm, of which 209 were repaired for the Romanian Army. Four 122 mm howitzers became self-propelled when they became the main armament of the first four prototypes of the Mareșal tank destroyer.

== Summary ==
The M1910/30 was a relatively minor upgrade of a World War I-era howitzer, which did not address the main flaws of the latter, namely:

- Limited towing speed due to unsprung wheels
- Limited elevation and very small traverse

A short barrel meant short range, less than that of its main adversaries, such as the German 10.5 cm leFH 16 (8,9 km vs 10,7 km). Low muzzle velocity and small traverse also made the gun helpless against enemy armor. Although in 1943 a HEAT shell was developed, the aforementioned deficiencies meant that a chance of hitting small moving target was slim.

On the other side, the M1910/30 was rugged and reliable. It was also lighter than the M-30 or the 10.5 cm leFH 16 and could be set up for combat in 30–40 seconds. Thanks to it, the howitzer was well liked in the RKKA.

In 1930 the Soviet Union still was not ready for development and mass production of modern artillery, so upgrading old guns was a reasonable decision.

== Ammunition ==
Available ammunition
Type	Model	Weight, kg	HE weight, kg	Velocity, m/s (max. propellant load)	Range, m
Armour-piercing shells
HEAT (from May 1943)	BP-460A
High explosive and fragmentation shells
HE-Frag, steel (1,000 fragments to hit personnel in radius of 30 meters)	OF-462	21.76	3.67	364	8,910
Fragmentation, steely iron	O-462A	21.7		364	8,910
Fragmentation, steely iron	О-460А
HE, old	F-460			344	7,550
HE, old	F-460N			344	7,550
HE, old	F-460U			344	7,550
HE, old	F-460K			344	7,550
Shrapnel shells
Shrapnel with 45 sec tube	Sh-460			343	7,230
Shrapnel with T-6 tube	Sh-460T			342	7,240
Chemical shells
Fragmentation-chemical	OH-462			364	8,950
Chemical	H-462	21.8	–	366	8,477
Chemical	H-460		–	358	7,700
Other shells
Illumination	S-462		–	340	6,800
Propaganda	A-462		–	364	7,000
Smoke, steel	D-462			364	8,910
Smoke, steely iron	D-462A
