= 122 mm howitzer M1909/37 =

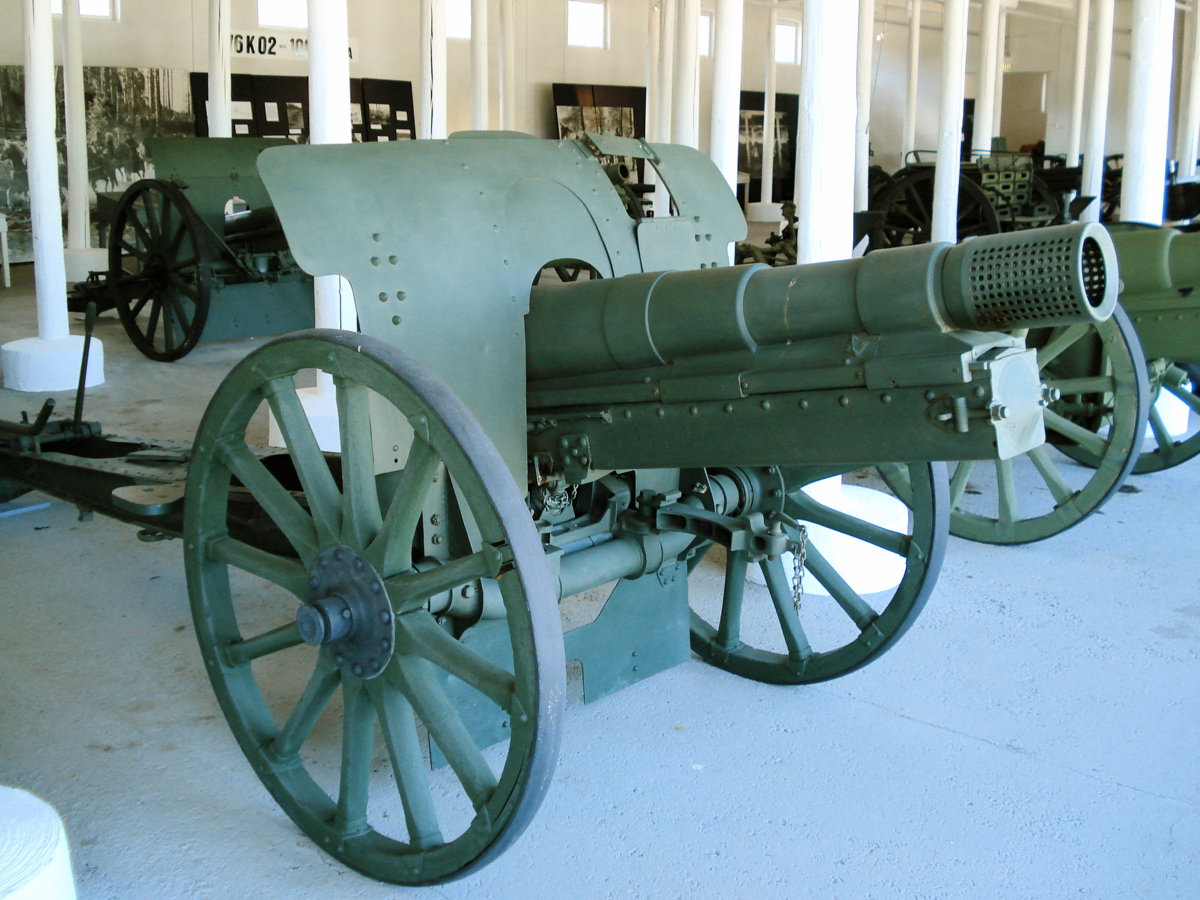
- 122 mm howitzer M1909/37 in Hämeenlinna Artillery Museum.
- Type: field howitzer
- Place of origin: USSR

Production history
- No. built: up to 900

Specifications
- Mass: combat: 1,450 kg (3,197 lbs) travel: 2,480 kg (5,467 lbs)
- Barrel length: overall:1.69 m (5 ft 7 in) L/14
- Shell: 122 x 261mmR
- Caliber: 121.92 mm (4.8 in)
- Breech: Horizontal sliding-block
- Recoil: Hydro-spring
- Carriage: Box trail
- Elevation: −1° to 43°
- Traverse: 4°
- Rate of fire: 2 rounds per minute

122 mm howitzer M1909/37 (Russian: 122-мм гаубица обр. 1909/37 гг.) was a Soviet 121.92 mm (4.8 inch) howitzer, a modernization of World War I era 122 mm howitzer M1909. The gun saw combat in the German-Soviet War.

== Development and production history ==
The gun resulted from a modernization of the Russian 122 mm howitzer M1909, initially developed by Krupp. The M1909 was employed by the Imperial Russian Army during World War I and remained in service after the revolution.

From late 1920s the RKKA sought to upgrade its First World War-era artillery pieces. The modernization of the M1909, handled by Perm Plant in 1937, included:

- Lengthened chamber
- New sights
- Strengthened carriage

The resulting gun was adopted as 122-mm howitzer M1909/37. About 800–900 old M1909 guns were upgraded to the M1909/37 standard.

The M1909/37 was a typical short-barrel howitzer, intended mostly for shooting with elevations from +20° to +43°. Shell could be fired with six propellant loads (no. 1 to 5 and full). The gun had horizontal sliding breechblock, hydraulic recoil buffer and spring-driven recuperator. The carriage was of single trail type with unsprung wooden wheels and limited traverse.

== Organization and employment ==
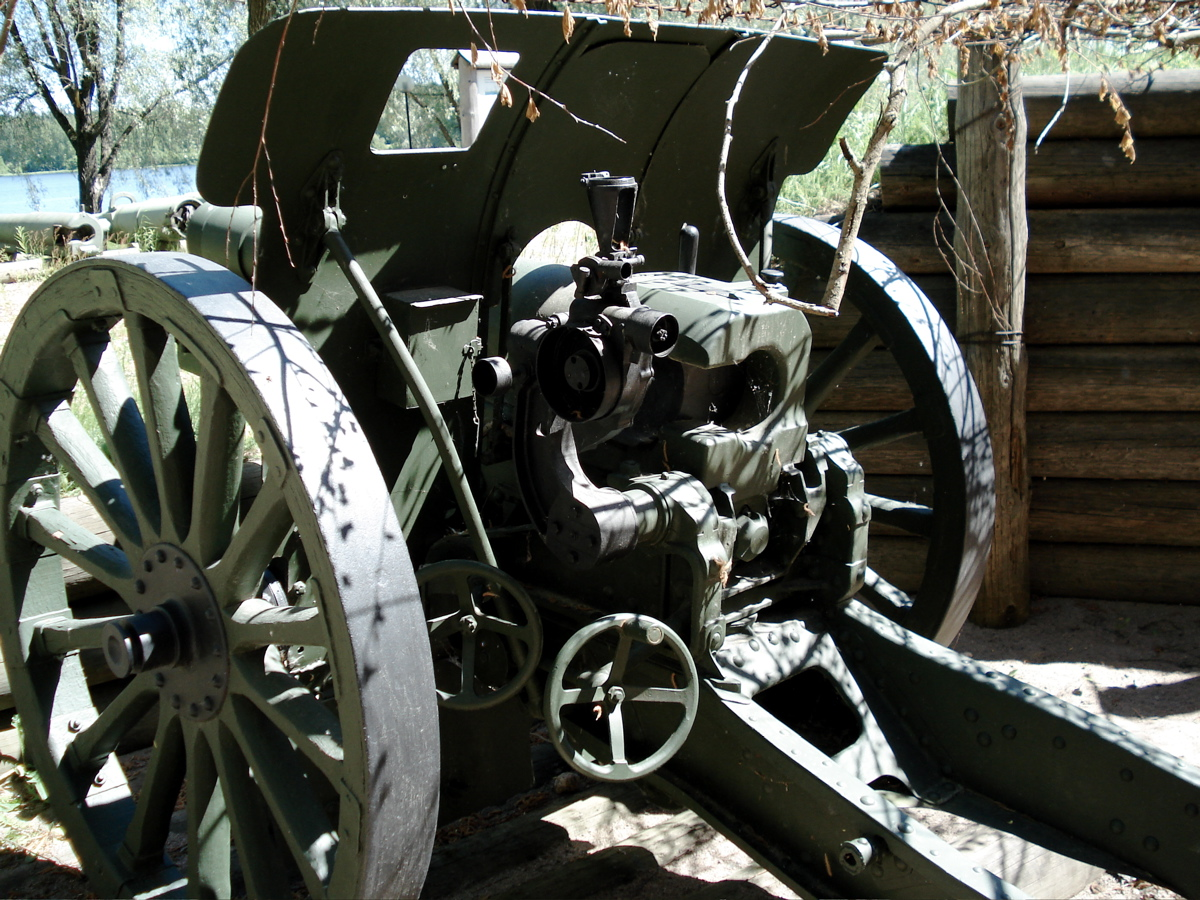
M1909/37 in Hämeenlinna Artillery Museum, Finland.

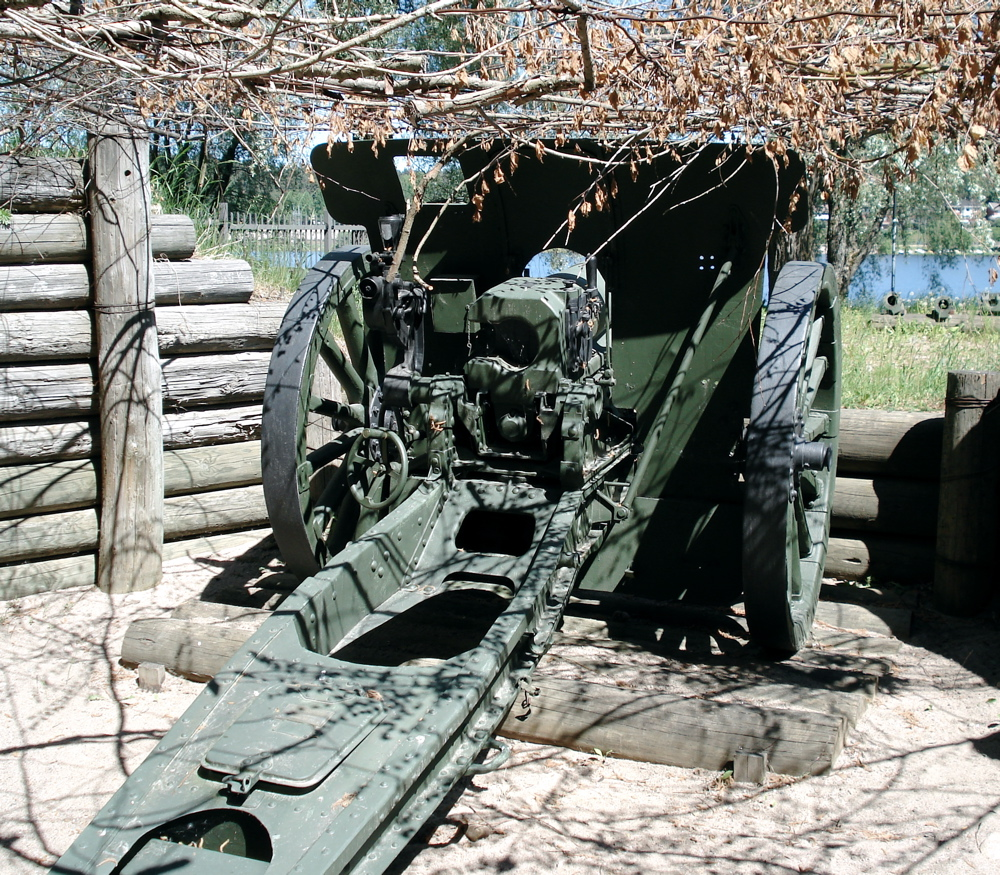
M1909/37 in Hämeenlinna Artillery Museum, Finland.

=== Red Army ===
The M1909/37 was a divisional level howitzer. According to the organization of 1939, each rifle division had two artillery regiments – light regiment (a battalion of 76 mm guns; two mixed battalions with one battery of 76 mm guns and two batteries of 122 mm howitzers) and howitzer regiment (a battalion of 122 mm howitzers and a battalion of 152 mm howitzers), giving 28 122 mm howitzers per division. In June 1940 one more battalion of 122 mm howitzers was added to the howitzers regiment, bringing the number to 32. In June 1941 the howitzers regiment was removed and the number of howitzers dropped to 16. This organization was used throughout the war, except in guard rifle divisions which from December 1942 had three artillery battalions (two batteries of 76 mm guns and one battery of 122 mm howitzers each), totaling 12 howitzers. From December 1944 they received howitzer regiment (5 batteries, 20 howitzers). From June 1945 rifle divisions were reorganized identically.

Mountain rifle divisions in 1939–40 had one battalion of 122 mm howitzers (3 batteries, 9 guns). From 1941 they received instead one artillery regiment (2 battalions, each from 3 four-gun batteries) with 24 howitzers. From early 1942 only one battalion (2 batteries, 8 howitzers) remained. From 1944 howitzers were removed from mountain rifle divisions.

Motorized divisions had two mixed battalions (battery of 76 mm guns, two batteries of 122 mm howitzers), totaling 12 howitzers. Tank division had one battalion with 12 howitzers. Cavalry divisions until August 1941 had two batteries of 122 mm howitzers, totaling 8, then the divisional artillery was removed.

Until late 1941 rifle brigades had a battery of four 122 mm howitzers.

122 mm howitzers were also used by the howitzer brigades of the Reserve of the Main Command (72–84 pieces).

The M1909/37 started to replace the M1909 in 1937. By 1 October 1936 RKKA possessed 920 M1909 howitzers; until the beginning of the German–Soviet War all of them were replaced. The modernized gun saw combat in the Winter War and the German–Soviet War. On 1 June 1941 RKKA possessed about 800 pieces. Due to combat losses, by the middle of the war only a limited number of pieces remained in service.

=== Other operators ===
A number of M1909/37s fell into the hands of Wehrmacht in 1941–42 and were adopted as 12,2 cm le.F.H.386(r).

Finnish Army captured a few in the Winter War and further 21 in the Continuation War. In Finnish service the gun was designated 122 H/09-30. The howitzers were used against their former owners; a few were lost in combat. Finns also modernized in a similar way M1909 howitzers they possessed since the Civil War, resulting in a gun designated 122 H/09-40 (about 30 pieces); the guns were used in the Continuation War.

== Summary ==
The M1909/37 was a relatively minor upgrade of a World War I-era howitzer, which didn't address the main flaws of the latter, namely:

- Limited towing speed due to unsprung wheels
- Limited elevation and very small traverse

The short barrel meant short range, smaller than that of its main adversaries, such as the German 10.5 cm leFH 16 (8,9 km vs 10,7 km). Low muzzle velocity and small traverse also made the gun helpless against enemy armor. Although in 1943 a HEAT shell was developed, the aforementioned deficiences meant that a chance of hitting small moving target was slim.

On the other side, the M1909/37 was rugged and reliable. It was also lighter than the newer M-30 or the 10.5 cm le.F.H.16. It was similar in most characteristics to another modernized World War I-era howitzer in Soviet service, the M1910/30, except slower rate of fire.

In 1937 the Soviet Union still did not possess a modern 122-mm howitzer design ready for mass production, so upgrading old ones was a reasonable decision.

== Ammunition ==
Although the M1909/37 has slightly longer barrel and slightly smaller maximum elevation than the M1910/30, according to Shirokorad these guns had identical ballistics.

Available ammunition
Type	Model	Weight, kg	HE weight, kg	Velocity, m/s (max. propellant load)	Range, m
Armour-piercing shells
HEAT (from May 1943)	BP-460A
High explosive and fragmentation shells
HE-Frag, steel (1,000 fragments to hit personnel in radius of 30 meters)	OF-462	21.76	3.67	364	8,910
Fragmentation, steely iron	O-462A	21.7		364	8,910
Fragmentation, steely iron	О-460А
HE, old	F-460			344	7,550
HE, old	F-460N			344	7,550
HE, old	F-460U			344	7,550
HE, old	F-460K			344	7,550
Shrapnel shells
Shrapnel with 45 sec tube	Sh-460			343	7,230
Shrapnel with T-6 tube	Sh-460T			342	7,240
Chemical shells
Fragmentation-chemical	OH-462			364	8,950
Chemical	H-462	21.8	–	366	8,477
Chemical	H-460		–	358	7,700
Other shells
Illumination	S-462		–	340	6,800
Propaganda	A-462		–	364	7,000
Smoke, steel	D-462			364	8,910
Smoke, steely iron	D-462A
