= US Standard Light Rail Vehicle =

Light rail vehicle

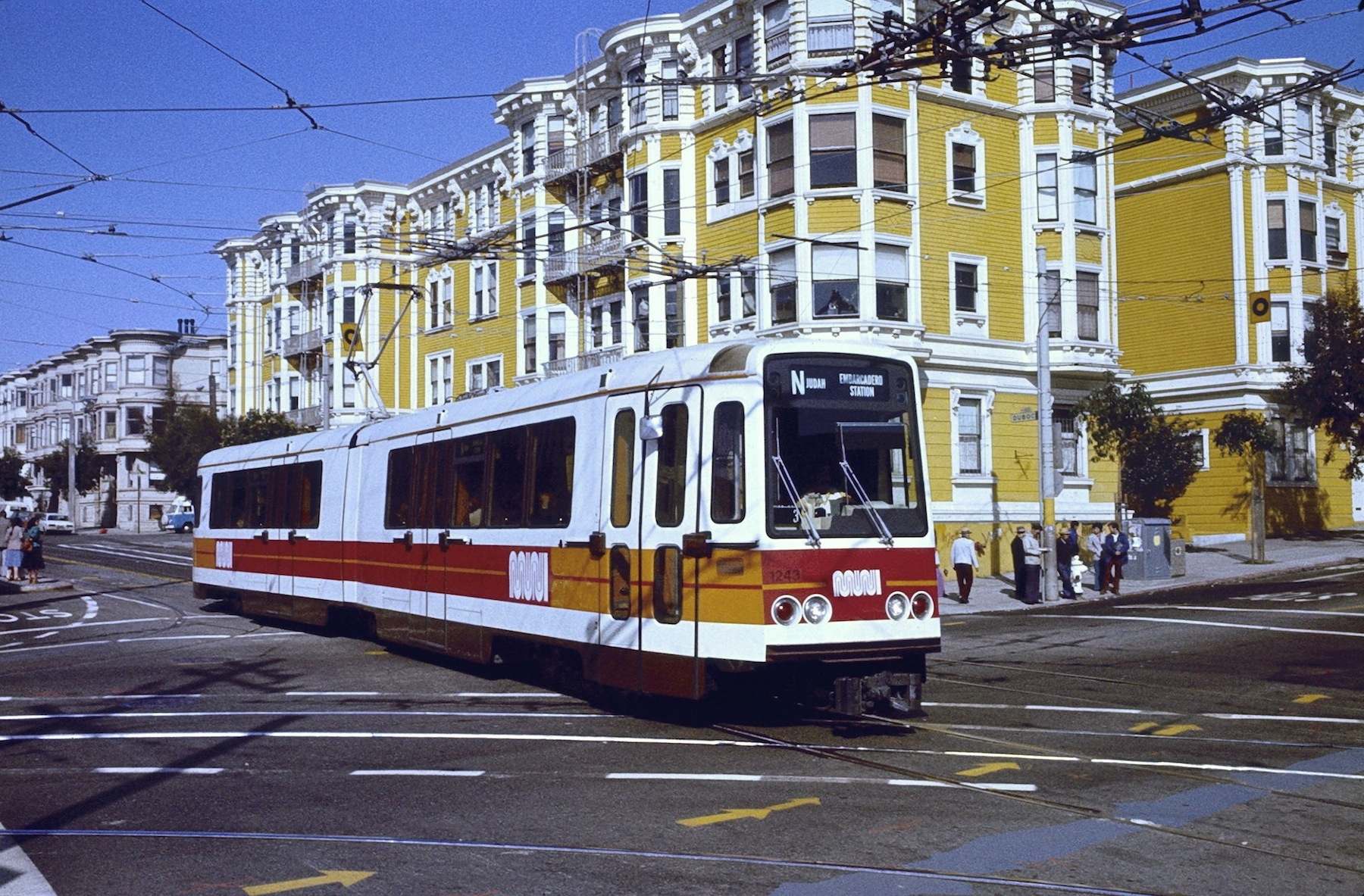
- A Boeing Vertol US SLRV in service for the San Francisco Municipal Railway in 1980, on the then–newly-opened Muni Metro
- In service: 1976–1998 (MUNI); 1976–2007 (MBTA)
- Constructed: 1976–1979
- Entered service: 1976–1984
- Scrapped: 1987–as late as 2020
- Number built: 275
- Capacity: seated 52 (MBTA, later reduced to 48 to provide room for wheelchairs) or 68 (Muni), with crush load of 219

Specifications
- Car length: 71 ft (21.64 m)
- Width: 8 ft 10 1/4 in (2,699 mm)
- Height: 11 ft 4 in (3.454 m) ATOR
- Floor height: 34 in (86.4 cm) ATOR
- Maximum speed: 50 mph (80.5 km/h) with multiple units
- Weight: 67,000 lb (30,391 kg) empty
- Traction system: Garrett AiResearch chopper control
- Traction motors: 2 × Garrett AiResearch 210 hp (157 kW), 152 kV, 280 V, 600 A DC motor, 1 per truck
- Acceleration: 3.1 mi/h/s (1.4 m/s/s)
- UIC classification: Bo’2Bo’
- AAR wheel arrangement: B-2-B
- Braking system: Air/Hydraulic NY Air Brake
- Track gauge: 4 ft 8 1/2 in (1,435 mm) standard gauge

The US Standard Light Rail Vehicle (SLRV) was a light rail vehicle (LRV) built by Boeing Vertol in the 1970s. The Urban Mass Transportation Administration (UMTA) of the United States Department of Transportation (USDOT) promoted it as a standardized vehicle for U.S. cities. Part of a series of defense conversion projects in the waning days of the Vietnam War, the SLRV was seen as both a replacement for older PCC streetcars in many cities and a catalyst for cities to construct new light rail systems. The US SLRV was marketed as and is popularly known as the Boeing LRV and SLRV and should not be confused with their prior Lunar Roving Vehicles for NASA.

The SLRV was purchased by the public transportation operators of Boston and San Francisco. In service by 1976, the US SLRV proved to be unreliable and scrapping started as early as 1987, but the SLRVs were not completely replaced on both systems until 2007. Although the SLRV itself was not successful due to poor reliability, it did set the general size and configuration for succeeding LRVs in the United States.

== History ==
=== Origin ===
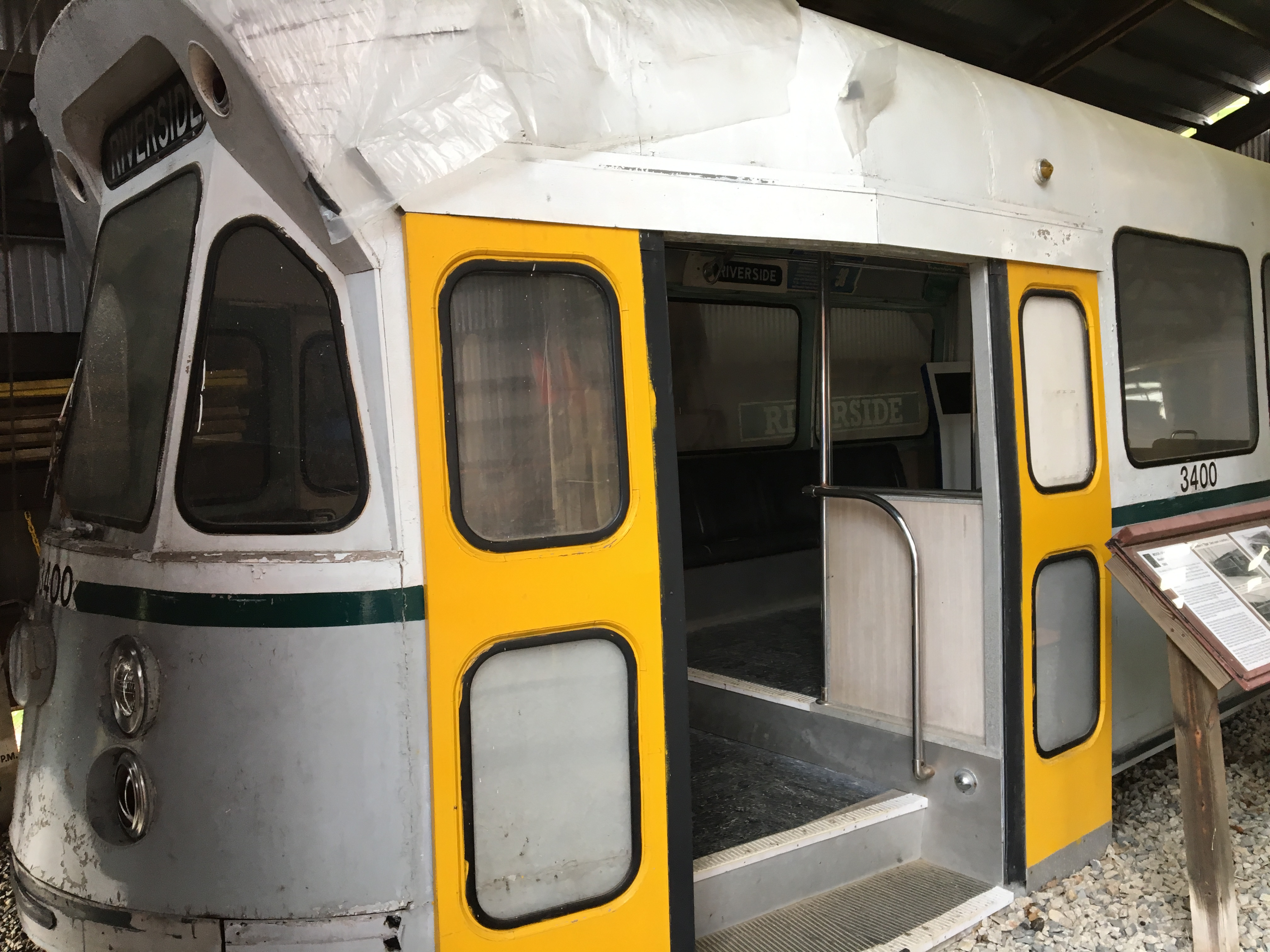
MBTA #3400 Type 6 wooden mockup from 1968, stored at Seashore Trolley Museum (2017)

The original concept of the SLRV came to fruition in the late 1960s as the limited number of cities with PCCs in North America were looking for modern replacements for their aging rolling stock; the last PCC had been manufactured in 1952. In 1968, the MBTA in Boston, one operator of PCC streetcars, created a mockup for one end of a proposed "Type 6" streetcar out of wood; the Type 6 program was discontinued after MBTA decided the cost to produce it was too high. Meanwhile, Muni in San Francisco, released a request for proposals in 1971 to purchase 78 new cars, designed by the rail transit engineering firm Louis T. Klauder and Associates (LTK), to replace their aging PCC fleet. The new cars, which Muni called subway-streetcars, were touted as "specially designed for San Francisco, adaptable to both subway and surface conditions and seating more passengers than the present [PCC] streetcars." Muni received two bids in November 1971, with a low bid price of US$473,000 (equivalent to $3,760,000 in 2025) per car from Boeing. Both bids were rejected as being excessively costly because potential builders were forced to recoup development costs over a relatively small number of vehicles.

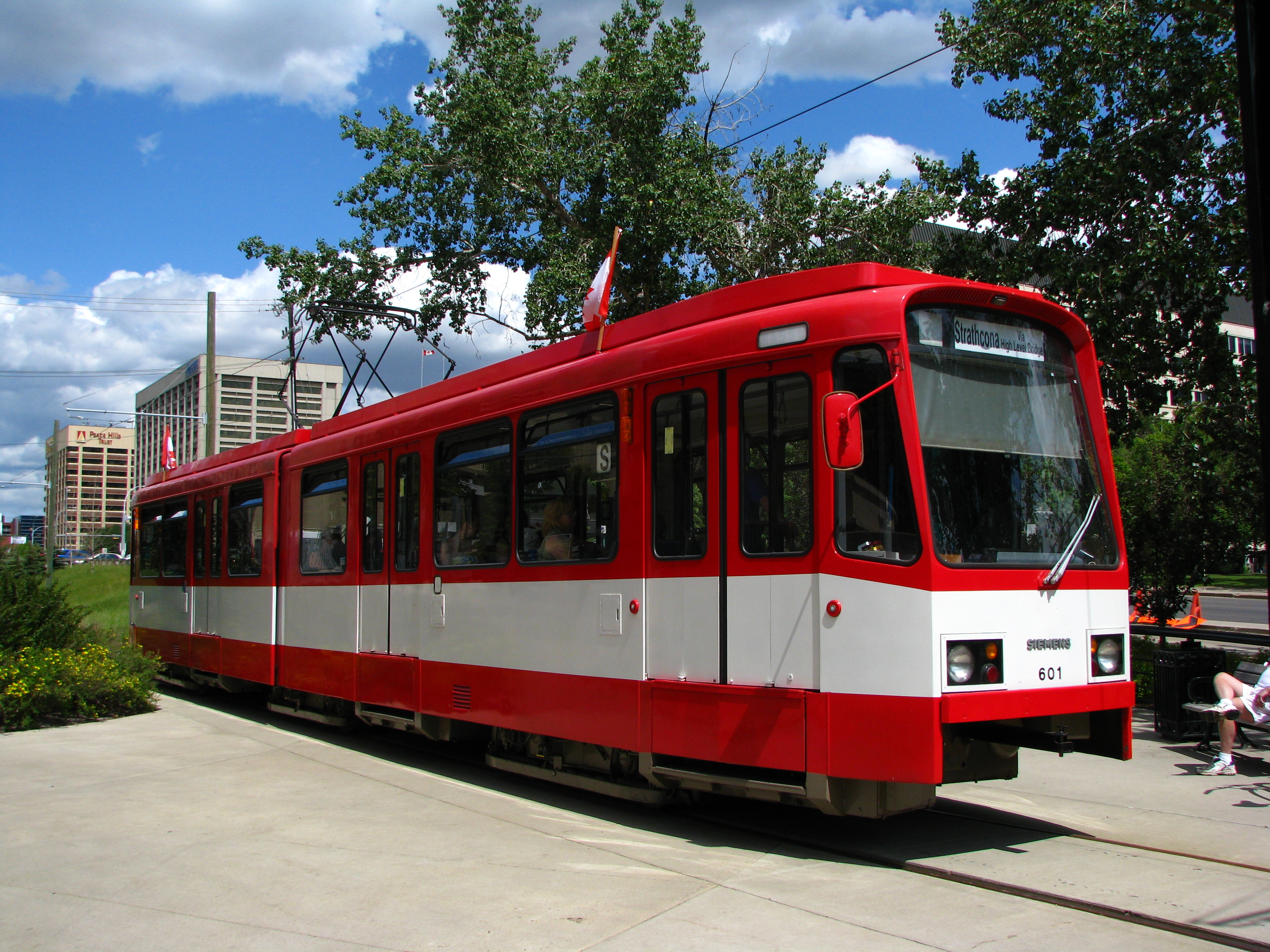
Siemens-Düwag car 601 (DE), 1970 "Hanover" prototype for the Hanover Stadtbahn

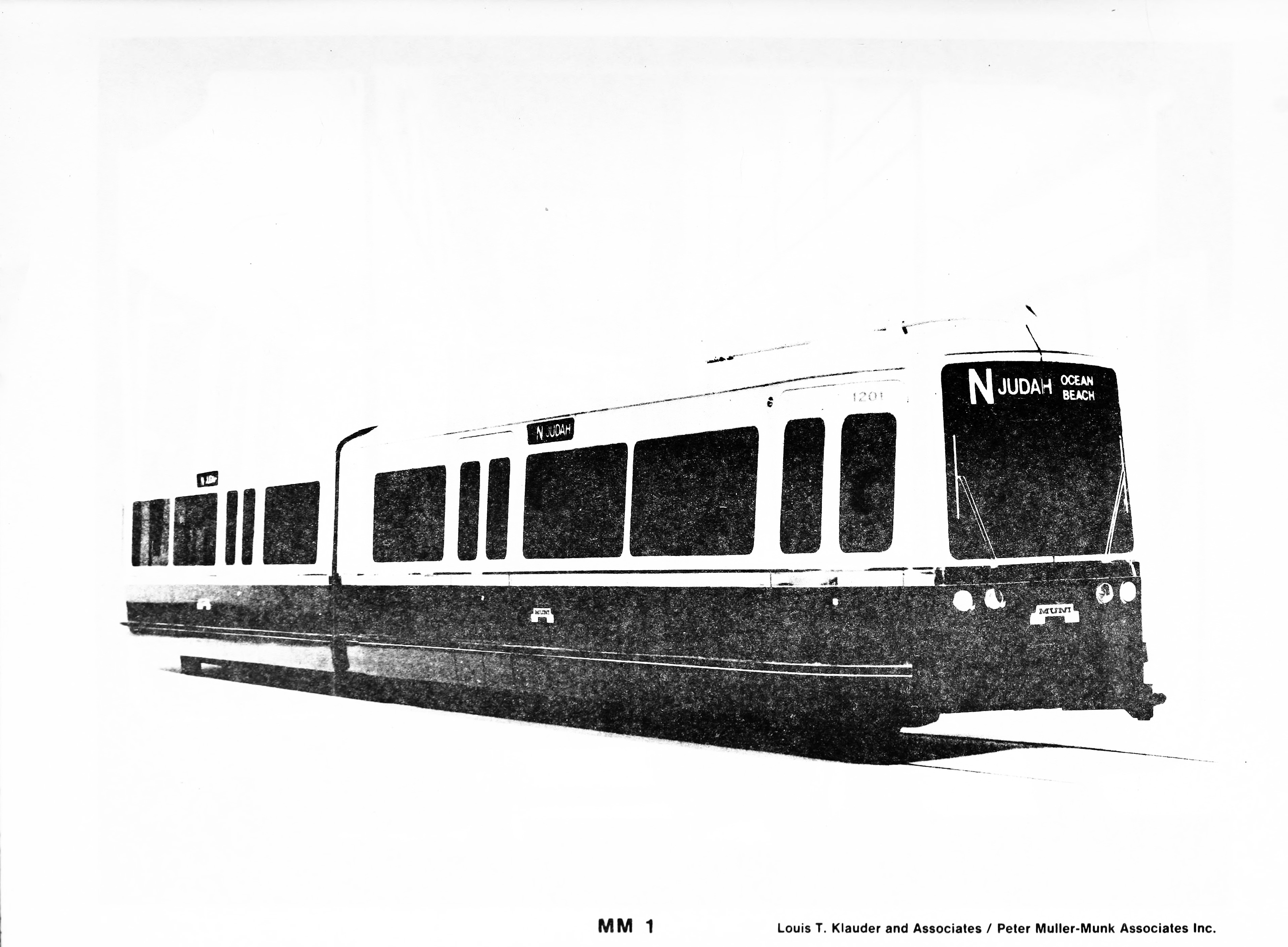
Exterior view of the Louis T. Klauder-designed subway-streetcars for San Francisco (1971)

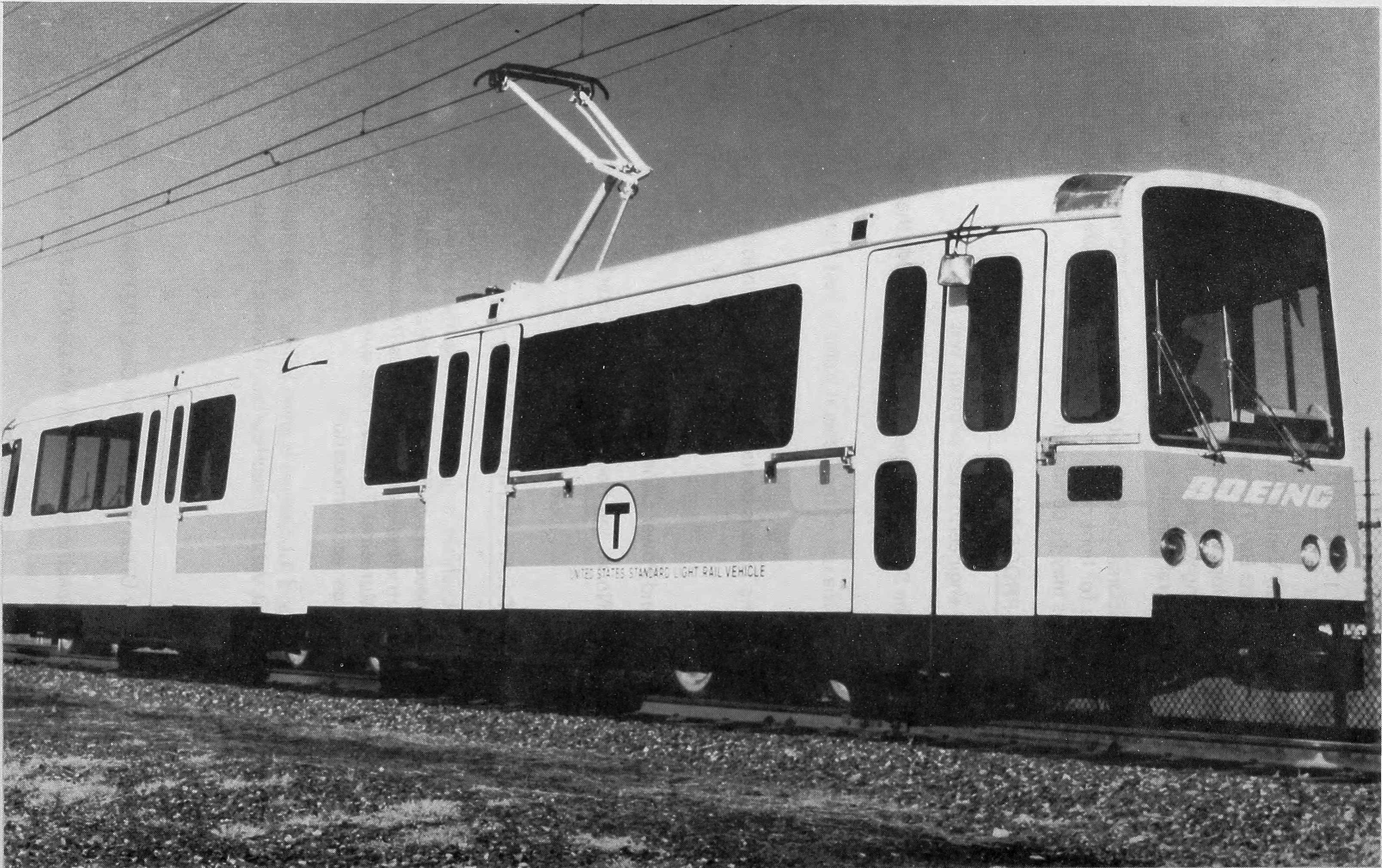
US SLRV at Pueblo for testing (1976). This car bears Muni Landor/"Sunset" livery, the MBTA logo, and Boeing branding on the nose.

Duewag had built a prototype as a demonstrator for the Hanover Stadtbahn in 1970 (Hanover car 601 [DE]); in June 1971 MBTA ordered two more prototype "Hanover" cars, to be partially paid using a grant from UMTA. However, under the Nixon administration's "New Economic Policy" introduced that fall, UMTA was not allowed to fund the grant. That policy, codified as "Buy America" in Title IV of the Surface Transportation Assistance Act of 1978, stated that UMTA could not fund any grants exceeding $500,000 for transit vehicles that were produced outside the United States unless an exception was approved by the Secretary of Transportation. Instead, Boston (MBTA) was directed to join with San Francisco (Muni) and Philadelphia (SEPTA) to design a new streetcar that could meet the needs of all three cities.

In response to the failure to procure the Type 6, Duewag, and LTK/Muni streetcars, UMTA organized the BSF (Boston and San Francisco) Committee to design a standardized light rail car to reduce per-unit costs, using the same concept under which the earlier PCC streetcars were designed. The Standard Light Rail Vehicle (SLRV) specification was developed by UMTA based on the 1971 LTK design for Muni in conjunction with potential operators (who were all currently operating PCCs) in Boston, San Francisco, Philadelphia (SEPTA), Cleveland (Shaker Heights), Pittsburgh (Port Authority), New Jersey, El Paso (City Lines), and Toronto (TTC) as well as industry consultants at Parsons Brinckerhoff and Louis T. Klauder and Associates. At the same time, a flood of defense conversion projects came to fruition as the result of government encouragement to help keep defense suppliers busy as the Vietnam War was coming to an end.

=== Contracts awarded ===
UMTA awarded a grant for US$33,000,000 to MBTA on October 20, 1972, towards the purchase of 150 SLRVs. On April 23, 1973, MBTA signed a contract with Boeing Vertol for the 150 SLRVs. On May 1, 1973, UMTA awarded Boeing Vertol of Philadelphia, Pennsylvania the contract to produce the SLRV at a cost of approximately $300,000 per car, US$316,616 (equivalent to $2,440,000 in 2025) each for the Muni configuration and US$293,422 (equivalent to $2,260,000 in 2025) each for the MBTA configuration. Muni initially ordered 80 cars and the MBTA ordered 150, and production commenced the same day the contract was awarded at a combined cost of US$69,000,000 (equivalent to $500,400,000 in 2025). MBTA was scheduled to receive its first SLRV for testing in February 1975, and the majority of its cars in 1976. The MBTA portion of the contract cost US$44,000,000 (equivalent to $319,100,000 in 2025) for 150 cars; MBTA later increased the order to 175 cars, adding an additional US$7,600,000 (equivalent to $49,620,000 in 2025) to their total cost (MUNI had likewise increased their order from 80 to 100 cars at that time), of which UMTA awarded MBTA US$7,000,000 (equivalent to $45,700,000 in 2025) on June 10, 1974. The SLRV was the first American-built trolley since 1952.

In late 1974, the first new SLRV was operated on a short test track at the Boeing plant. The first demonstrator model was produced in 1975 and was intended to be an early Muni car, and it was used for testing in Boston for eleven weeks. Three cars (two in the Muni configuration and one in the MBTA configuration) were shipped to the Transportation Test Center in Pueblo, Colorado in fall 1975 under a contract awarded to Boeing Vertol for engineering testing. MBTA received its first car for testing in September 1976, two years behind schedule. This first car was delivered with trolley poles in addition to the pantograph, as the MBTA was still in the process of reconfiguring its overhead lines to accommodate the latter.

=== Operators ===
US SLRVs in service with the only two operators: MBTA and Muni

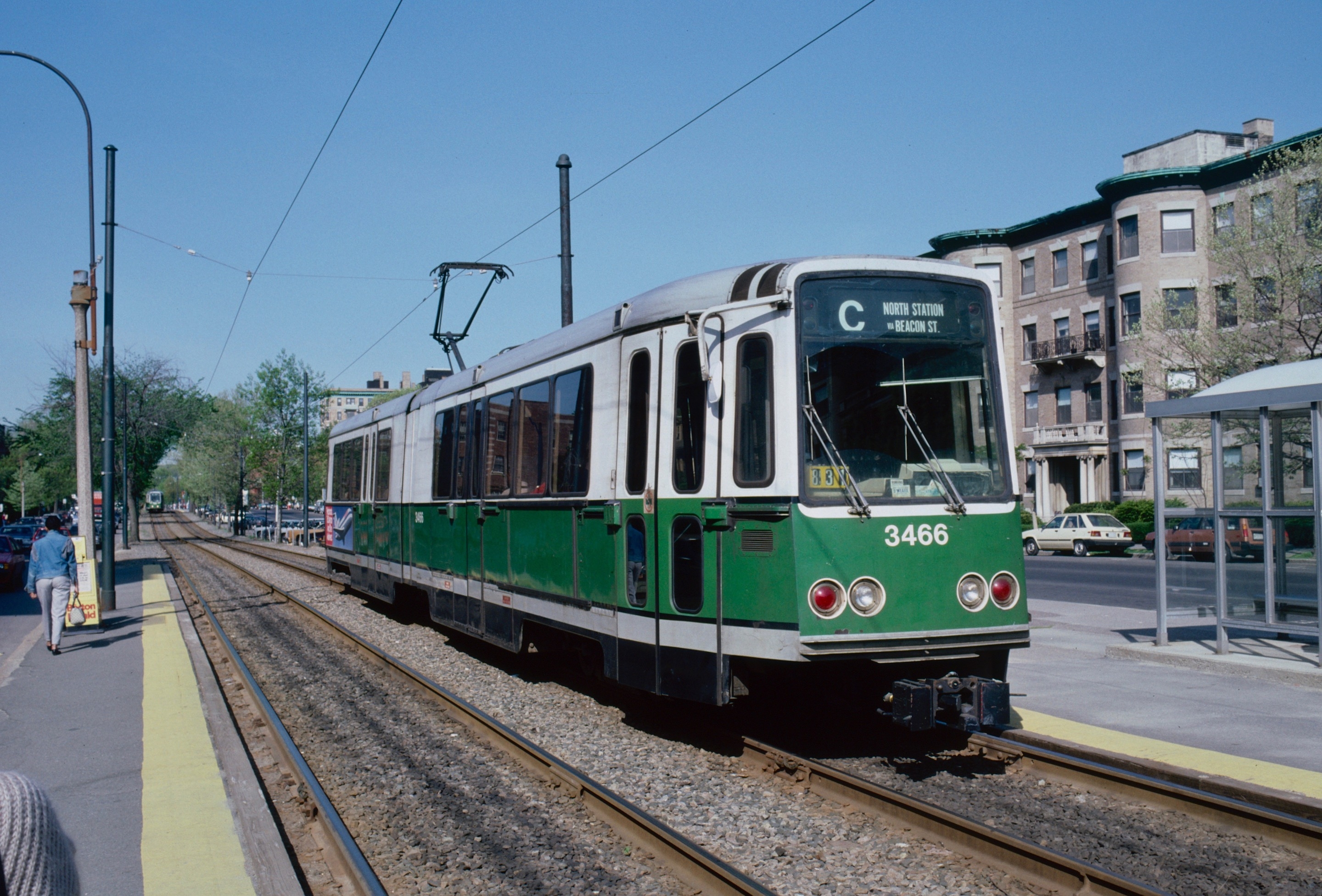
MBTA #3466 at Hawes Street stop (1987)

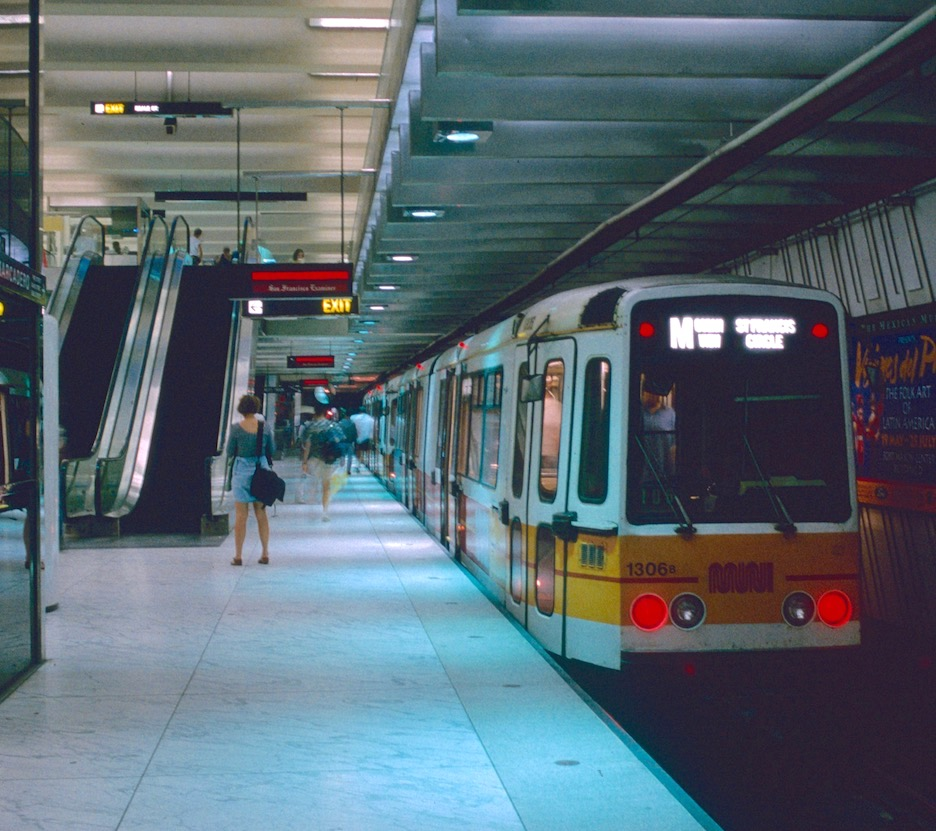
Muni #1306 forming part of a two-car train in the Market Street subway, in San Francisco (1993)

The first four SLRVs (3415, 3416, 3418, and 3421) entered revenue service on December 30, 1976, on the MBTA's Green Line D branch. However, revenue service with the SLRVs was suspended on April 16, 1977, due to numerous derailments, with 31 SLRVs delivered at that point. In San Francisco, the first two SLRVs were delivered in October 1977, and as with Boston's first car, these cars featured trolley poles as conversion to pantograph collection was not yet complete. Production models were delivered starting in December 1978, these cars having only pantographs, at which time the two pilot cars were returned to Boeing, and later re-delivered without the poles. The first regular runs on the Muni system came on April 23, 1979, on a temporary shuttle service, with more extensive use beginning with the opening of the Muni Metro on February 18, 1980.

Because the layout of Muni had several branch lines converging into the Twin Peaks Tunnel at West Portal and more lines merging near Church, Muni SLRVs were intended to couple into consists of up to a four cars as they entered the tunnel and underground portions of the route; as they exited, they would uncouple to continue on their assigned lines. However, due to slow door cycling and a three-second delay between the operator signal and actual brake release, the Muni SLRVs proved to be slower than the PCCs in surface operation, and Muni was unable to meet the planned four-minute headways on individual lines that would allow two-minute headways with coupled trains underground. In addition, trains could not be turned around to meet two-minute headways at the terminal Embarcadero Station. A new 6.5-acre (2.6 ha) Muni Metro Rail Center (later renamed the Curtis E. Green Light Rail Center) was constructed for storage and maintenance near the Balboa Park station after Muni decided to purchase the cars the MBTA had rejected.

The Greater Cleveland Regional Transit Authority tested MBTA car #3401 on former interurban lines in mid-1976 but ultimately declined to purchase the US SLRV, instead buying custom LRVs of a different design from Breda Costruzioni Ferroviarie. When Cleveland released a request for quote in September 1977, Boeing Vertol bid US$869,492 (equivalent to $4,600,000 in 2025) per SLRV, exceeding Breda's winning bid of US$645,833 (equivalent to $3,400,000 in 2025) per car. Ironically, Breda would later construct light rail cars that would replace the SLRV's in both San Francisco and Boston (see Replacements and retirement section). SEPTA was initially interested (especially because the SLRV would be locally produced) but purchased custom LRVs from Kawasaki because the US SLRV would not clear the City Hall loop. SEPTA tailored the bid by specifying the vehicle width to be four inches (102 mm) narrower than the SLRV specification to exclude it from consideration. The Kawasaki cars for SEPTA were assembled at the Boeing Vertol plant to meet "Buy America" requirements.

While Pittsburgh, New Orleans, and Newark collaborated with UMTA in designing the SLRV, and already had traditional streetcars, they ultimately did not buy the cars, nor would any newly built light rail systems, such as San Diego. Pittsburgh converted their legacy low-entry streetcar system into dual-entry light rail, in a similar fashion to San Francisco's Muni Metro, and bought (at the time) custom Siemens SD-400 light rail cars, these being derived from the Siemens–Duewag U2 design originally built for the Frankfurt U-Bahn and later adapted for the newly built light rail systems in San Diego, Edmonton, and Calgary. Newark would continue to operate PCC's until 2001, when they were replaced with new low-floor LRV's built by Kinki Sharyo vehicles. New Orleans, which had never adopted the PCC design, continues to operate its 1920's vintage Perley Thomas-built streetcars, supplemented by modern custom-built replicas. All subsequent newly built light rail systems have likewise bought customized equipment from Siemens, Kinki Sharyo, Breda, and other builders that have since entered the US light rail market.

The US SLRV design also influenced the early design of the Canadian Light Rail Vehicle.

Operator	Year Built	Fleet Series	Quantity	Year of retirement	Notes
MBTA	1976–1978	3400–3534	144	1987–2007	3417, 3448, and 3453 were converted to maintenance of way equipment. 3424 was sent to Seashore Trolley Museum in 2009.
MBTA	1977	3535–3543	144	1987–2007	Part of the initially rejected option of 40; 31 of these were later delivered to Muni and 9 were delivered to MBTA in 1983. 3541 was sent to the U.S. Army in 2000.
Muni (LRV1)	1978	1200–1299	131	1996–2001	Two prototype cars were delivered in October 1977, numbered 1220–1221; they were later renumbered 1212–1213. 1222 and 1252 were damaged during subway testing on Nov 12, 1979; these cars were scrapped for parts, which were used to finish ex-MBTA 3565, renumbered to Muni 1252 (II) and delivered on Jan 27, 1982. 1212 wrecked into 1255 at the Van Ness junction in the Muni Metro subway in 1987. The good halves were converted into a new 1255 and the bad halves were scrapped in February 1994.
Muni (LRV1)	1977	1300–1329	131	1996–2001	31 cars in total. The first car from the rejected MBTA lot (ex-3565) was procured to replace two wrecked cars from the original order of 100 and reassigned number 1252. The other 30 ex-MBTA cars were numbered 1300–1329 and entered service in 1981–1984.

=== Issues ===
They work, but they just don't work as well as they should. Practically every part in the car is a brand new design. Everyone said the technology would work, but it hasn't.

— Kenneth Campbell, MBTA, 1978 interview

Before they were delivered, Boeing claimed the US SLRV would be reliable and virtually maintenance-free. From their earliest days of service, however, the SLRVs proved to be very mechanically and financially taxing. After the initial three months of service, the MBTA was forced to halt all light rail service on April 16, 1977, for nine or ten days due to equipment unavailability. The MBTA was unable to retire their PCCs; instead, MBTA instituted a PCC rebuilding program to augment the SLRV fleet and maintain Green Line service. In San Francisco, the problems with the SLRVs led to the Muni Metro not reaching its full potential until 1982.

According to the original design specification, the goals for mean time between failures were set at 1,400 hours or 21,000 miles (34,000 km) for the propulsion and auxiliary electric systems, which assumes average operating speeds of 15 miles per hour (24 km/h); 1,500 hours or 22,500 miles (36,200 km) for door and step systems; and 4,000 hours or 60,000 miles (97,000 km) for the friction brakes. In comparison, for 1982, Muni SLRVs were breaking down an average of every 600 miles (970 km) (40 hours at 15 mph (24 km/h) operating speeds); reliability rose to 1,800 to 2,000 mi (2,900 to 3,200 km) (120–133 hours) between failures by 1988, but this was still a failure rate almost 15 times the frequency of the 28,300 miles (45,500 km) (1,890 hours) MTBF for the Siemens–Duewag U2 used in the San Diego Trolley system.

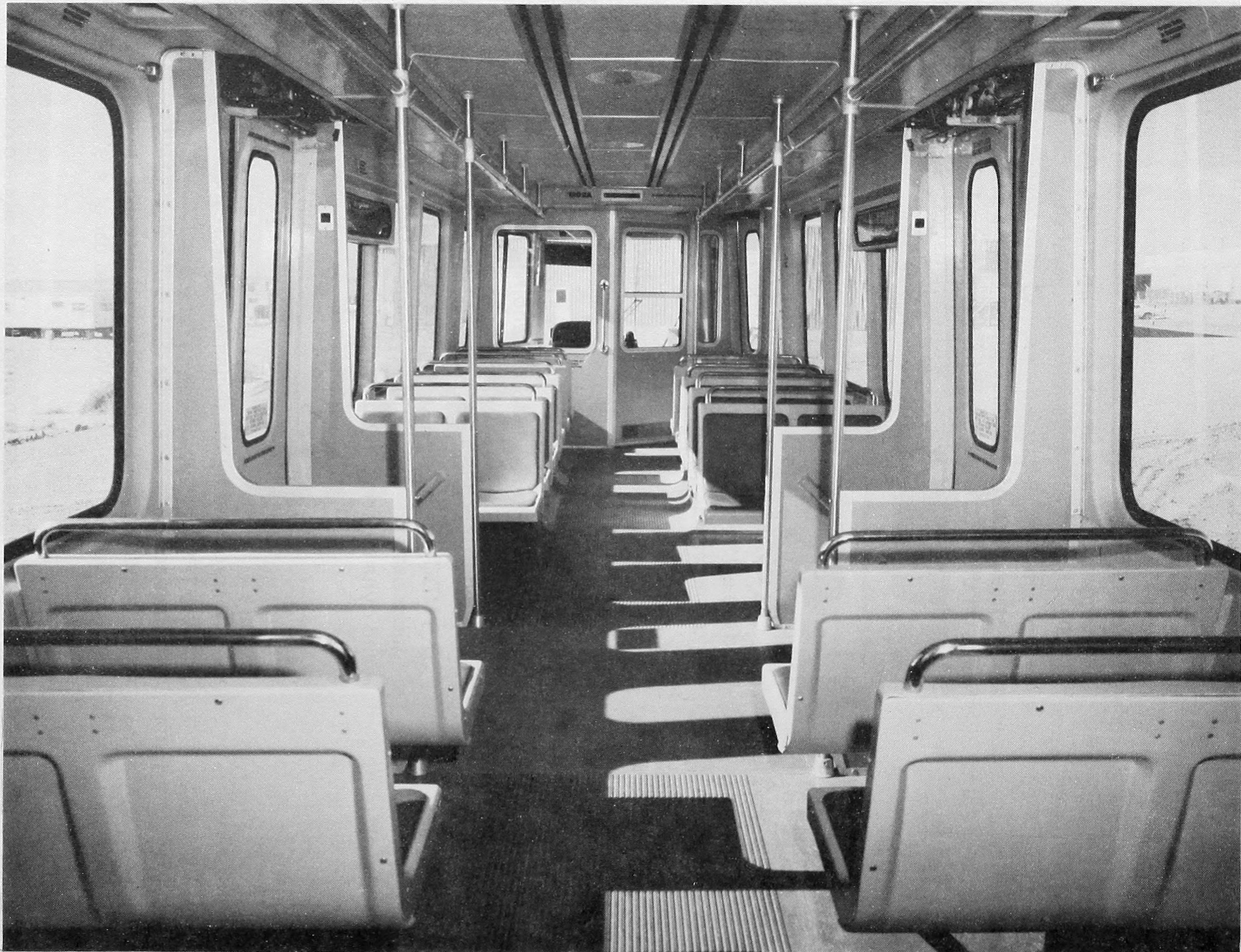
Interior of Muni car, looking towards end from near articulated section. Note resilient seating.

In Boston, the MBTA was accepting new cars from Boeing Vertol, but the cars were falling out of service faster than the MBTA's maintenance staff could repair them. In addition, the MBTA could not acquire replacement parts fast enough to repair the disabled SLRVs. In a desperate effort to keep as many SLRVs operating as possible, MBTA set aside 35 disabled cars to be cannibalized for replacement parts.

MBTA purchased $2.2 million in spare parts in May 1978 to alleviate further issues, and Muni purchased $1.5 million in parts, forewarned by the MBTA experience. Muni also requested to add 200 employees in order to maintain and run the new SLRVs. Shipments of US SLRVs to MBTA were suspended in June 1978 after 135 cars had been delivered due to ongoing issues, and MBTA prepared the 35 cannibalized cars for return to Boeing later that year. On October 9, 1978, MBTA rejected the final 40 SLRVs and directed Boeing Vertol to retrieve the 35 cannibalized cars, concluding that poor fleet reliability meant that Boeing was in breach of warranty. By 1978, the first five cars had been delivered to Muni; those had already undergone three rounds of modifications based on the MBTA experience.

=== Settlement ===
On December 15, 1978, MBTA and Boeing signed an agreement that revised specifications to enable the full delivery of 175 SLRVs, but reliability issues continued through 1979. An independent commission recommended that MBTA reorganize its LRV program and take quick action to resolve those issues. The SLRV fleet availability typically was less than 50% of the total number of cars on the property for the first few years of service; during the second and third quarters of 1979, Green Line trains missed 12,201 weekday trips, a 184% increase over the 6,598 missed weekday trips over the same period in 1978. In May 1979, MBTA and Boeing signed an agreement to modify and refurbish the 35 cannibalized SLRVs, but MBTA maintenance workers threatened to strike after MBTA ordered Boeing to retrieve the SLRVs, demanding the work be conducted in MBTA shops; Boeing stated in July that it would not accept any more SLRVs from Boston (three had already been returned) until the labor dispute had been resolved. MBTA, Muni, and Boeing began to meet during the summer of 1979 to determine who would be responsible for resolving the identified problems. Boeing made an offer in September 1979 which identified specific design issues that would be corrected at its expense, including leaking gearboxes, air conditioning compressor issues, and traction motor failures, but MBTA rejected the offer; around this time, MBTA hired product liability attorney and law professor William Schwartz to negotiate on its behalf in August 1979.

Boeing took the position that issues had been caused by poor maintenance, poor track conditions, driver errors, and cannibalization. Schwartz argued that availability of the SLRV was less than 90% and had cost MBTA $75–100 million to that point. On November 19, 1979, MBTA and Boeing reached a settlement; in order to make up for financial losses due to equipment unavailability, Boeing Vertol would return $40 million to MBTA for the cost of repairs and modifications to several cars. In addition, the MBTA was allowed to reject delivery of the 40 cars remaining from the amended 175-car order. At the time of the settlement, 41 of MBTA's 135 SLRVs were inoperable due to design issues, accidents, and/or cannibalization for parts, which would require an estimated US$15,600,000 (equivalent to $69,200,000 in 2025) to restore to operating condition. Under the terms of the settlement, all warranties were terminated, and any further repairs would be the responsibility of MBTA, not Boeing, although Boeing would deliver modification kits to MBTA, whose maintenance personnel would install them at MBTA's expense to correct the previously identified issues. Boeing would only warranty the kits for defects in the parts; if they did not resolve the issues, MBTA would be responsible for the cost of redesign as well. The size of Schwartz's fee for negotiating the settlement, US$799,000 (equivalent to $3,544,000 in 2025), prompted an investigation by the Massachusetts legislature.

=== Final deliveries ===
The 40 rejected MBTA cars sat in storage at Boeing Vertol's plant for a short time, until San Francisco's Muni purchased some of these cars at a steep discount. The first of the "Boston" cars which Muni purchased was to replace two SLRVs which had been damaged during preservice Muni Metro subway testing in 1979 and were deemed beyond economic repair. After the successful conversion of that first car, Muni ordered an additional 30 SLRVs from the rejected Boston units to further bolster their fleet. The "Boston" cars in San Francisco were modified to meet the needs of the Muni Metro, but were easily distinguished by the wood grain interior finish at the operator's cab and articulation section, which did not match the yellowish orange color (from the Walter Landor-designed "sunset" livery) on the cars delivered under the original Muni order of 100.

By 1980, Boeing was no longer marketing the SLRV. In 1983 the last SLRVs at Boeing Vertol's facility were delivered when the MBTA accepted nine remaining cars (3535–3543) from the group of 40 that MBTA had previously rejected. MBTA also took delivery of five cannibalized "shells" in 1983; these had been delivered to MBTA in the 1970s, but were subsequently returned to Boeing in 1979. The title for these five cars reverted to Boeing because MBTA did not respond promptly under the terms of the 1979 settlement, and had been scrapped to supply parts in the meantime. The five "shells" were scrapped in 1988.

SLRV compared to key competitors
	Boeing SLRV	Duewag U2	PCC	CLRV	Buffalo LRV
Axles/ articulation	6/1	6/1	4/0	4/0	4/0
Length	71.5 ft 21.8 m	75.5 ft 23.0 m	43.5 to 50.5 ft 13.3 to 15.4 m	50.67 ft 15.44 m	66.8 ft 20.4 m
Width	8.85 ft 2.70 m	8.70 ft 2.65 m	8.33 to 9.0 ft 2.54 to 2.74 m	8.50 ft 2.59 m	8.58 ft 2.62 m
Height	11.5 ft 3.5 m	10.8 ft 3.3 m	10.1 ft 3.1 m	11.0 ft 3.4 m	12.3 ft 3.7 m
Floor height	2.82 ft 0.86 m	3.18 ft 0.97 m	2.75 ft 0.84 m	3.02 ft 0.92 m	3.07 ft 0.94 m
Weight (empty)	68,000 lb 31,000 kg	66,000 lb 30,000 kg	33,000 to 42,000 lb 15,000 to 19,000 kg	52,000 lb 24,000 kg	70,000 lb 32,000 kg
Seats	up to 68	64	49 to 69	42 or 47	51
Minimum curve radius	32 to 42 ft 9.8 to 12.8 m	82 ft 25 m	approx. 40 ft 12 m	38 ft 12 m	unk.
Acceleration	4.1 ft/s^{2} 1.2 m/s^{2}	3.3 ft/s^{2} 1.0 m/s^{2}	4.6 ft/s^{2} 1.4 m/s^{2}	4.6 ft/s^{2} 1.4 m/s^{2}	4.2 ft/s^{2} 1.3 m/s^{2}
Deceleration	5.1 ft/s^{2} 1.6 m/s^{2}	3.9 ft/s^{2} 1.2 m/s^{2}	4.6 ft/s^{2} 1.4 m/s^{2}	5.1 ft/s^{2} 1.6 m/s^{2}	4.4 ft/s^{2} 1.3 m/s^{2}
Emergency deceleration	8.8 ft/s^{2} 2.7 m/s^{2}	10 ft/s^{2} 3.0 m/s^{2}	9.5 ft/s^{2} 2.9 m/s^{2}	10 ft/s^{2} 3.0 m/s^{2}	6.4 ft/s^{2} 2.0 m/s^{2}

== Design ==
SLRV outline and dimensions

The SLRV is a double-ended, high-floor, articulated light-rail vehicle 71 ft (22 m) long overall (over the anticlimbers), in the same range as many heavy rail vehicles both contemporary and now, but noticeably shorter than many other modern LRVs, such as the at-minimum-81-foot (25 m) Siemens S70 and S700 commonly found today, which rides on three two-axle trucks (six axles in total). The two end trucks are spaced 13 ft 6 in (4.11 m) from each end (couplers included) and 23 ft (7.0 m) from the center truck under the articulating section, allowing a minimum track radius of 32 ft (9.8 m). The dimensions of the SLRV were determined by the existing track constraints of three proposed operators: MBTA (Boston), Muni (San Francisco), and SEPTA (Philadelphia). Each car has an A and a B end separated by a central articulated section. Each side has three passenger doors 53 in (1,300 mm) wide: one near the operator's cab, and two straddling the articulated section; there is no door at the rear (trailing) cab (in the direction of travel). The tested empty weight of the vehicle (including 1,770 lb (800 kg) of instrumentation) was 69,130 lb (31,360 kg); for a normal load of 100 passengers, the vehicle was 82,500 lb (37,400 kg) and for the crush load of 219 passengers, the vehicle was 104,495 lb (47,398 kg).

Each end truck carries a single DC motor which powers both axles and has a rated output of 210 hp (160 kW) at 1135 RPM, operating on 285 VDC; the traction motor drives the wheels through a reduction gear set of 5.571:1. In the original 1971 LTK design for Muni, the center truck was also powered, giving a top speed of 65 mph (105 km/h); in the final SLRV specification, the center truck was not powered and the top speed was reduced to 50 mph (80 km/h). Power to the traction motors is controlled through a solid state "chopper" circuit operating at a frequency ranging between 0 and 400 Hz for vehicle speeds up to 17 mph (27 km/h), allowing a continuously variable control of power from the 600 V overhead lines rather than the conventional trolley control at the time, which used a varied number of discrete resistances to control motor current. Above 17 mph (27 km/h), the power is not "chopped" and is instead applied directly to the traction motors.

Primary dynamic braking is accomplished by running the traction motors as generators and dissipating the electricity generated through two brake resistor grids; a friction brake consisting of a single inboard disc brake per axle is blended with the dynamic braking as needed. The friction brake alone is sufficient to hold a fully loaded SLRV (with 219 passengers) on a 9° slope. In addition, six electromagnetic track brakes are provided; on the Muni cars, the track brakes are controlled independently to hold the car in place when starting on a slope, and on the MBTA cars, the track brakes are blended into the main brakes. Dynamic braking was enabled by using a separate power source to energize the field coils on the traction motors; Boeing stated that regenerative braking was possible. Although regenerative braking was not implemented on the SLRV, it was enabled on the similar CLRV.

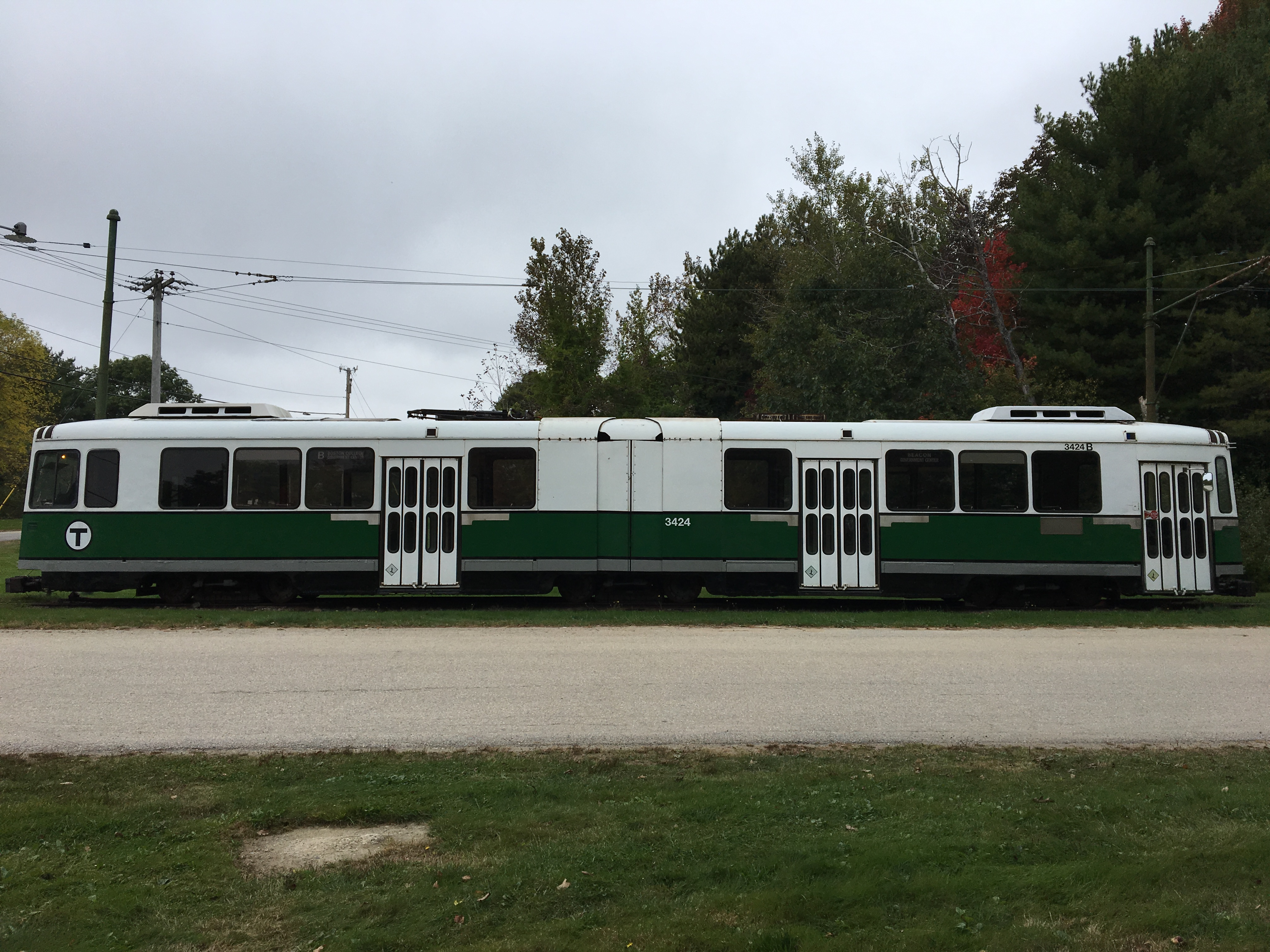
MBTA #3424 at Seashore Trolley Museum (2017), as rebuilt in 1997 to add roof-mounted air conditioning units on each end and bifold doors (three per side).

The articulated section allows up to 16° of rotation in the horizontal plane, 3° of vertical sag (center section lower than ends), and 4.3° of vertical crest (center section higher than ends), which permits the SLRV to traverse curves as sharp as 42 ft (13 m) inside radius, travel through valleys with a vertical curvature of 460 ft (140 m), and crest hills with a vertical curvature of 310 ft (94 m).

The SLRV rolls on lightweight Acousta Flex composite resilient wheels 26 in (660 mm) in diameter; these wheels use aluminum hubs separated from the steel rims/tires by a silicone rubber cushion. The cushion is 3/16 in (4.8 mm) thick and is injected in the threaded space between the rim and hub; the design was developed by Standard Steel and BART in the 1960s. The resilient wheels reduce squeal when negotiating tight curves. Interior noise was claimed to be 65 dB. The design of the trucks is adapted from the Japanese Shinkansen trains. The trucks are equipped with rubber chevron springs and pneumatic suspension, which automatically adjusts to maintain floor height with varying loads. Damping is accomplished by both hydraulic (lateral) and pneumatic (vertical) means.

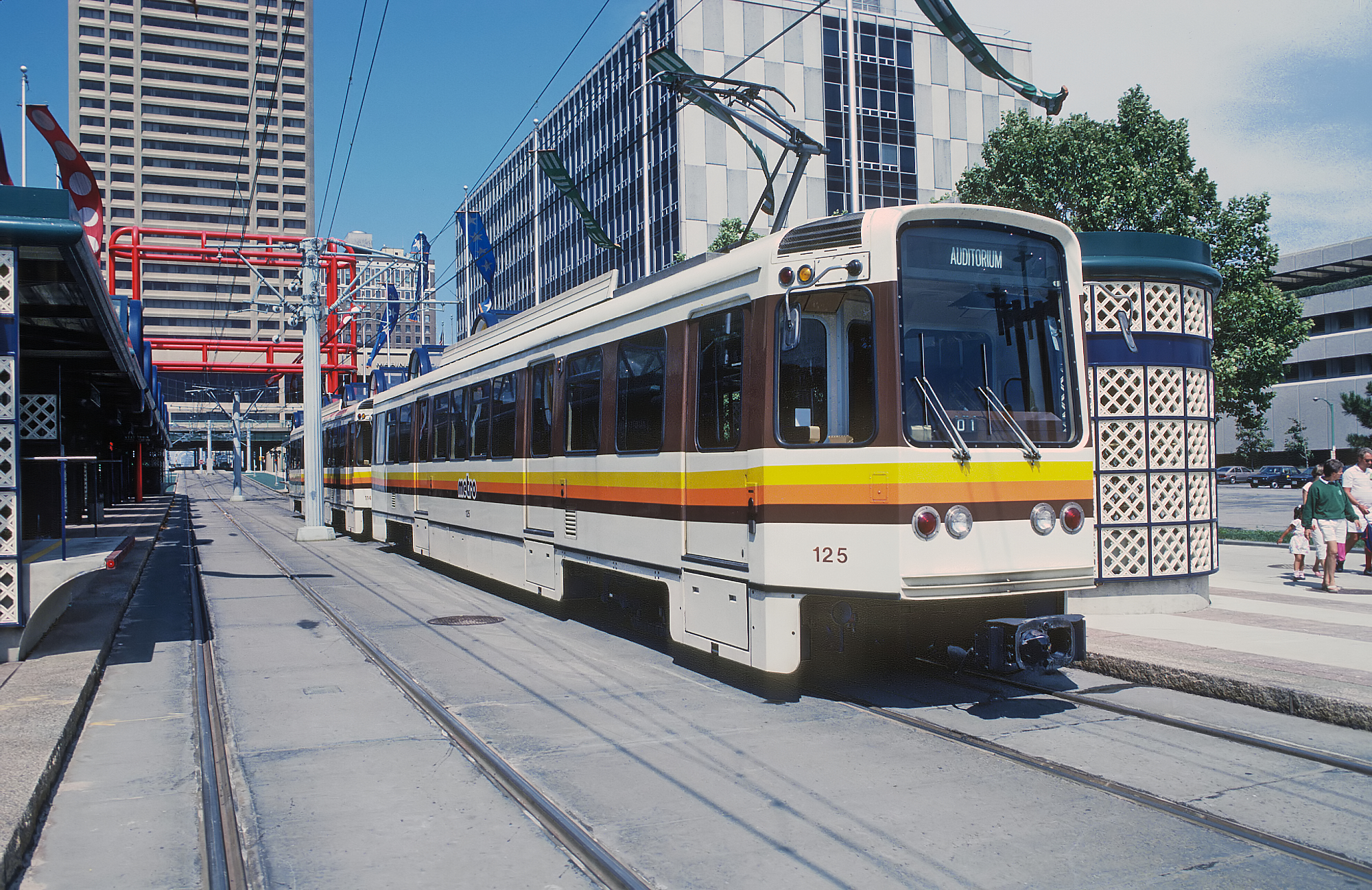
Buffalo Metro Rail LRV by Tokyu (1988)

The car body shells and truck frames were built by Tokyu Car Corporation in Yokohama and the motors provided by Garrett, with assembly at the Boeing plant in Ridley Park, Pennsylvania. After production was ended by Boeing, Tokyu Car Corporation built light rail cars for Buffalo Metro Rail which externally resemble the SLRV, but many differences, most noticeably the lack of articulation, use of external steps for low-platform boarding instead of internal steps, and the use of single-leaf pocket doors similar to the London Underground D Stock.

=== Differences ===
SLRV differences
	MBTA	Muni
Seats	52 (Note: Later reduced to 48)	68
Cab Signalling	No	Yes
Steps	Fixed (Note: Allows street level boarding)	Convertible (Note: Convertible steps on the four center doors only) (Note: Allows boarding from high platforms and at street level)
Overspeed Control	Yes (Note: 52 mph (84 km/h) limit)	No
Destination Signs	Manual	Automatic
Air Conditioning	Yes (Note: Single blower speed)	No (Note: Three blower speeds)
Track brakes	Blended	Independent
Wheel Tread Contour	1:40	1:20
Notes

While Boston and San Francisco bought their cars at the same time and they appear very similar externally, the cars have differences:

- Doors: The doors themselves, at first, were essentially the same. However, Muni's cars had moveable steps at the four center doors (those nearest the articulated section), which could be lowered for street-level boarding or raised for boarding from high-level platforms, such as those in the subway. The Boston cars did not have this feature and so must be boarded from street level. The doors were designed to accommodate both types of stairs. These doors proved troublesome and the MBTA eventually replaced them with bi-folding doors, further distinguishing them from Muni's.
- Appliances: The MBTA SLRVs were fitted with air-conditioning units for Boston's humid climate. Due to San Francisco's relatively mild climate, the Muni SLRVs were provided with forced-air ventilation instead of air conditioning. The air conditioning units that the Boston cars were delivered with had problems such as sucking up dust and other debris from the subway tunnels and were later replaced with roof-mounted Sutrak air conditioners in the late 1980s to mid-1990s.
- Interior styling: The "Boston" cars featured wood-grain interior finishes at the operator's cab and articulation section, while Muni cars had a yellowish-orange–color interior. However, certain Muni SLRVs (numbered 1252 and 13xx) actually had the same wood-grain interior finish as Boston's because those cars were originally built for Boston, who rejected and returned them to Boeing. Muni then bought these cars, had their air-conditioners removed and fitted them with all the features exclusive to its fleet. The wood grain in these cars is thus the only feature that distinguishes these cars from those originally made for Muni.
- Automation: Muni cars were equipped with cab signaling to enable automated operation through the Market Street subway with planned headways as low as sixty seconds.
- Seating: The San Francisco cars originally had cushioned seats, but they were replaced with hard plastic seats in 1985, because of vandalism.
- Capacity: San Francisco's cars seated 68, while the Boston cars seated 52 until the MBTA later had four seats removed to better accommodate wheelchairs.

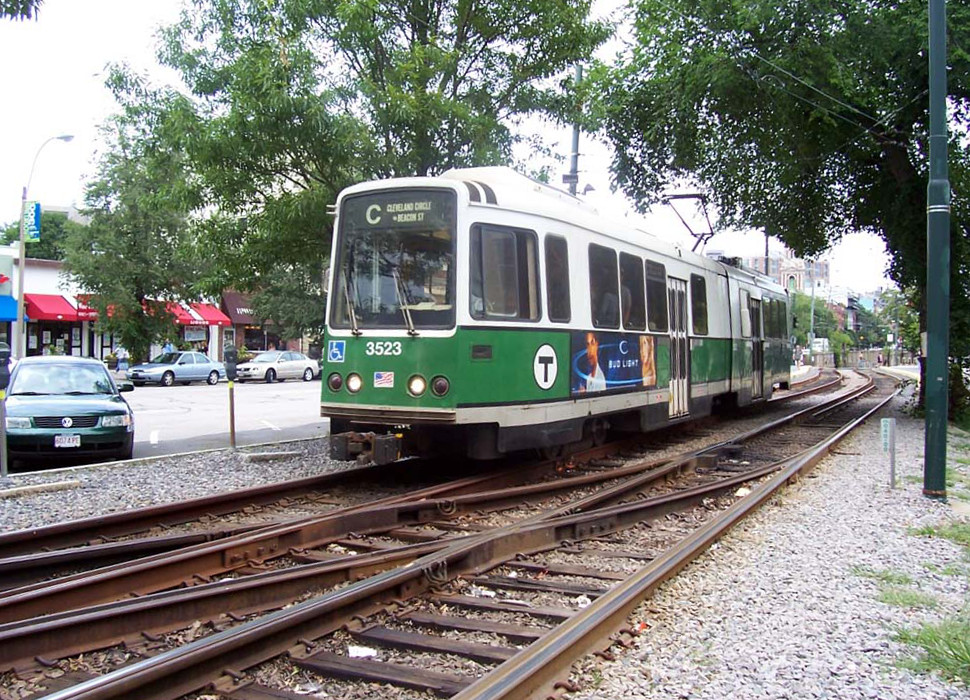
Boeing Vertol US SLRV #3523 in service for the MBTA on the Green Line C branch, bound for Cleveland Circle, in 2005. This view shows the roof-mounted air-conditioning units and bi-fold doors added by MBTA in place of the original equipment. MBTA's last Boeing cars were retired in March 2007.

== Problems ==
One of the largest issues was simply that the Boeing SLRV was a compromise. Boston and San Francisco had very different needs for the SLRV, Boston needing a more traditional streetcar, while San Francisco needed a more specialized car for its Muni Metro subway. Because the San Francisco cars would use station platforms at both street level (at surface stations) and high level (in underground stations), the vehicle steps needed to switch between the two modes. This became a passenger flow problem since the Muni cars could only use the two center doors on the SLRVs in the subway: The front end of the car curved away from the high-level platforms too much to allow passengers to safely board or alight the cars. The narrow front end, in turn, was required by Boston so the SLRV could navigate the tight curves in the MBTA's 1897-vintage subway.

Professor Seymour Melman partially blamed the use of a longtime defense contractor. Boeing Vertol's customary client, the US Department of Defense, was relatively budget-insensitive and more tolerant of cost overruns and had sufficient funding and workforce to conduct complex maintenance, all contrary to the needs and abilities of a municipal transit agency. The design team primarily had experience in aerospace design, not rail vehicles, did not make a serious effort to gain that experience, and did not design for ease of maintenance. In some cases, portions of the SLRV had to be disassembled by acetylene torch to access components.

Boeing marketed the SLRV as a system and took the role of an integrator, subcontracting the design and fabrication of major components to external suppliers from places as far as Germany, Japan, and the United Kingdom. This approach created uncertainty in component delivery dates and essentially precluded prototype testing in favor of meeting contracted schedule milestones, turning MBTA and Muni into, effectively, beta testers for the SLRV. Because no prototype testing was conducted prior to vehicle delivery, the appropriate identification and stock levels of spare parts could not be established before delivery, and MBTA was forced to cannibalize SLRVs for parts to maintain fleet availability during the early years of operation.

Other specific problems with the SLRV include but are not limited to:

- Derailments on tight curves, which would seriously damage the car's articulation section, itself problematic as Boeing designed its own articulated section so as to avoid obtaining a license from overseas builders such as Duewag.
- Another major problem was the shorting of electrical systems and premature failures in the car's motors and propulsion systems. Boeing used a relatively advanced chopper control system for the cars as insisted on by the federal government. While such systems have been implemented successfully in many subway, light rail and trolley bus systems, the systems installed in Boeing's cars were found to be overly complicated for the transit systems' use. It is, however, unclear how problematic this was as chopper control did prove to be commonplace in the United States into the early 1990s.
- The SLRVs came equipped with overly complex plug doors, which were originally intended to accommodate high-platform operation for Muni in the Market Street subway. Boeing established a requirement to have the doors automatically reopen if an obstruction was encountered while closing in order to avoid crushing passengers; the firm initially charged with designing the doors successfully met this requirement but made the doors too sensitive: The doors would reopen upon closing, as they falsely detected obstructions. Boeing hired another subcontractor to redesign the doors, stipulating that fewer components should be used. These doors would frequently short circuit and caused a significant nuisance for the MBTA. The transit agency later attempted to correct the issues with the plug doors by adding a wider rubber strip and eliminating the recycling circuit, but the issue was not fully resolved until the mid-1990s, when MBTA retrofitted all of their Boeings with much more reliable bi-fold doors.
- The corrosion of car shells was another major issue. Cars are constructed primarily of low-alloy, high-tensile steel except for a stainless steel roof panel. Both Boston and San Francisco are oceanside port cities, making the cars particularly susceptible to damage from sea spray. Some cars barely saw a decade of service before being withdrawn due to corroded bodies, as their bodies were shipped from Japan as deck cargo through the Panama Canal and spent a further amount of time sitting outside the Boeing plant near Philadelphia before being assembled and delivered.
- The blended braking system incorporating a single mechanical disk brake on each axle with the resistive brake on the powered trucks was labor-intensive to maintain and unreliable. For the succeeding Type 7 cars delivered by Kinki Sharyo, MBTA chose to use a mechanical-only pneumatic braking system.
- The Boston cars' air-conditioning units were originally mounted under the car and constantly sucked in dirt and debris. The MBTA later modified 76 SLRVs with roof-mounted air-conditioning units to address this.
- The Acousta Flex composite resilient wheels that were originally fitted to the SLRV tended to fail in service and during testing; the bond failed between the elastomer and the wheel rim, which led to the wheel coming apart and also eliminated the electrical path to ground, as conductors were used between the wheel hub and rim. The Acousta Flex wheels were out of production by 1981.

== Replacements and retirement ==
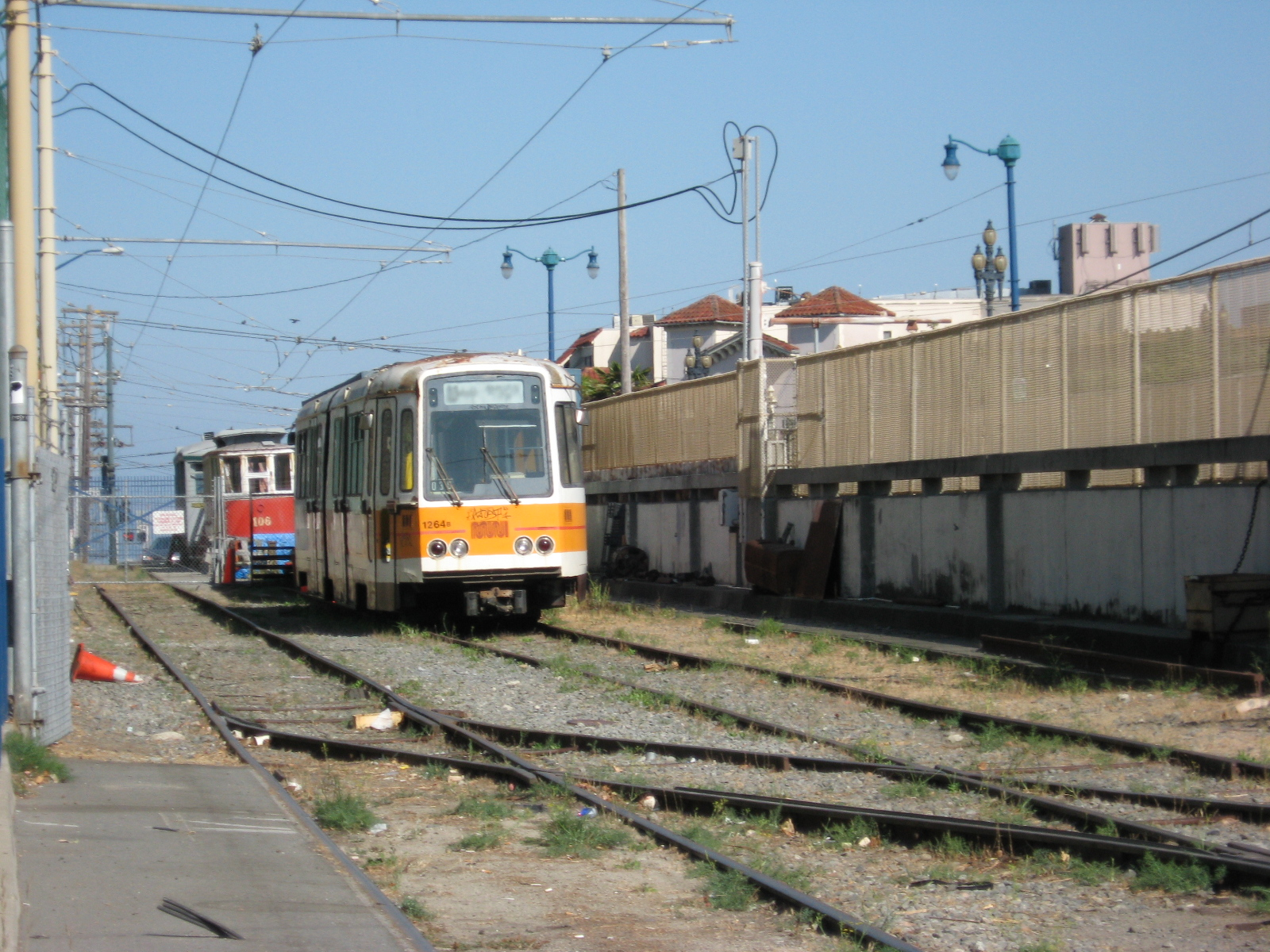
Retired Muni Boeing Vertol US SLRV #1264 stored at the Duboce Yard in San Francisco in 2007. This car was scrapped in 2016.

The problems of the SLRV quickly led their purchasers to look for replacements and supplements to their fleet. Despite improvements, the SLRVs were still proving to be problematic throughout the 1980s, and both cities decided that Boeing cars would not be part of the long-term future of either transit system. The Federal Transportation Administration took an unprecedented step and reduced the economic life of the Boeing SLRV to 15 years (from "at least 25 years" for trolleys procured using federal assistance), allowing MBTA and Muni to retire the SLRVs early and pursue procurement of replacements by the late 1980s and early 1990s.

Although the SLRV itself was beset by reliability issues and was not successful, Gregory Thompson credits it with making cities aware of light rail transit and defining a modern light rail vehicle. The successor vehicles in Boston (Kinki Sharyo Type 7) and San Francisco (Breda LRV2/3) closely follow the specifications and performance of the SLRV.

SLRV and successors
	Boeing SLRV	Kinki Sharyo Type 7 (MBTA)	Breda LRV2/3 (Muni)
Axles/ articulation	6/1		
L×W×H (Note: Length measured over couplers)	73 ft × 8.85 ft × 11.5 ft 22.25 m × 2.70 m × 3.51 m	74 ft × 8.67 ft × 11.83 ft 22.56 m × 2.64 m × 3.61 m	75 ft × 9 ft × 11.5 ft 22.9 m × 2.7 m × 3.5 m
Floor height	34 in 860 mm	35 in 890 mm	34 in 860 mm
Weight (empty)	68,000 lb 31,000 kg	85,000 lb 39,000 kg	79,000 lb 36,000 kg
Motors	2×160 kW (210 hp) (1 motor/truck)	4×100 kW (130 hp) (2 motors/truck)	4×97 kW (130 hp) (2 motors/truck)
Capacity	52/68 seated 219 (crush)	50 seated	60 seated
Minimum curve radius	32 to 42 ft 9.8 to 12.8 m	42 ft 13 m	45 ft 14 m
Acceleration	4.1 ft/s^{2} 1.2 m/s^{2}	4.1 ft/s^{2} 1.25 m/s^{2}	4.6 ft/s^{2} 1.4 m/s^{2}
Deceleration	5.1 ft/s^{2} 1.6 m/s^{2}	5.1 ft/s^{2} 1.56 m/s^{2}	5.8 ft/s^{2} 1.78 m/s^{2}
Emergency deceleration	8.8 ft/s^{2} 2.7 m/s^{2}	n/a	8.7 ft/s^{2} 2.66 m/s^{2}

=== MBTA ===
After the MBTA terminated their contract with Boeing Vertol, they were free to make their own modifications to the cars. Several systems were upgraded or improved. Slowly but surely, cannibalized cars were brought into the MBTA shops to be prepped for service.

The MBTA also started "splicing together" damaged cars. Cars 3454 and 3478 had been involved in a high-speed, rear-end collision. The two ends of the cars that made contact were severely damaged. The MBTA's maintenance crews brought the two cars into the shops, and later car 3478 (consisting of 3478A and 3454B) returned to active duty. Car 3454 (consisting of the damaged 3454A and 3478B) was pushed out into the dead storage yard for future disposition. The experience gained in this type of repair laid the ground for several other such cars being returned to revenue service. Eventually, the MBTA's maintenance staff got the active fleet to around 114 cars in the early 1980s.

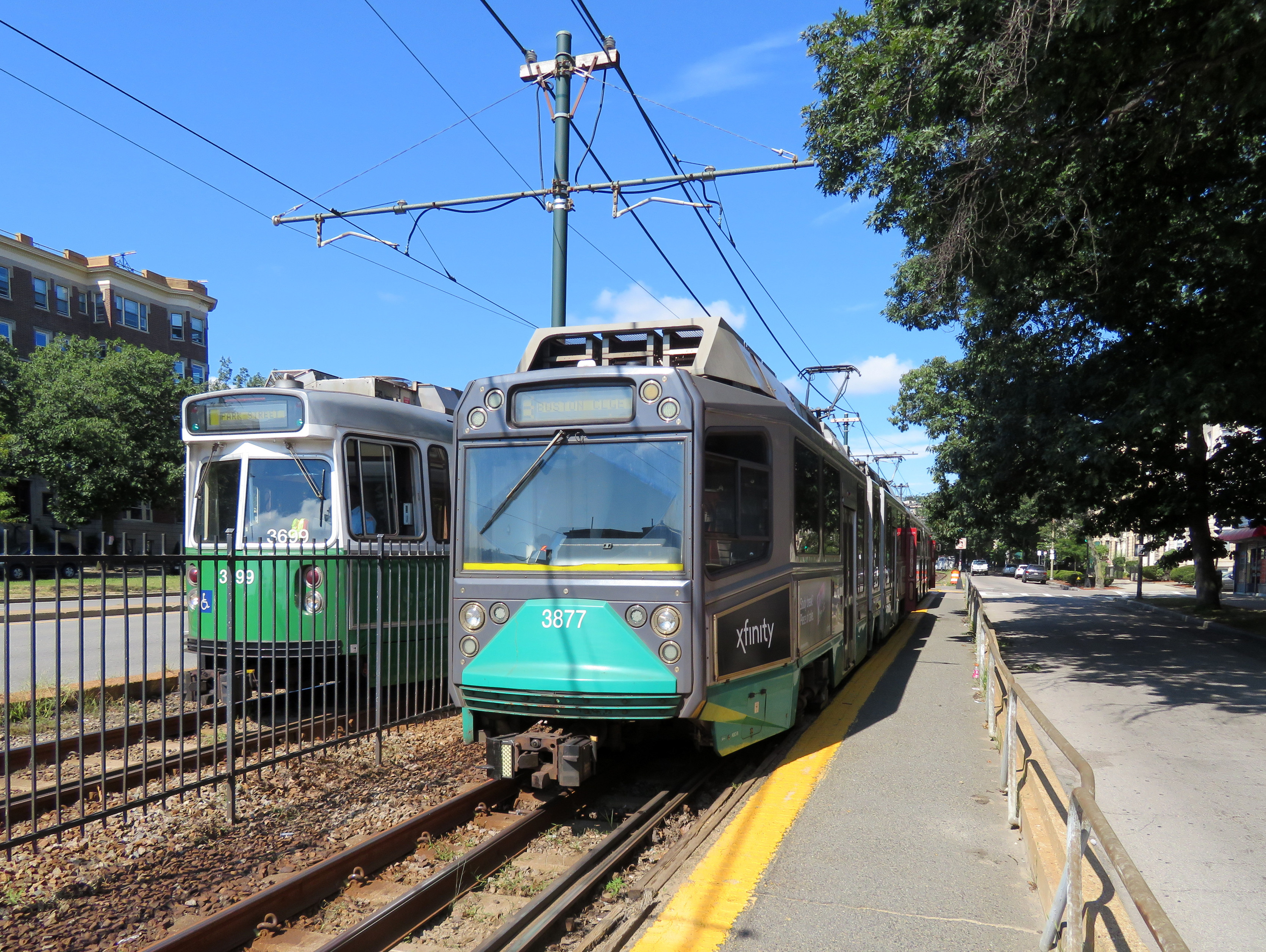
MBTA No. 3699 (left, Type 7) and No. 3877 (right, Type 8) at Allston Street station (August 2018)

Between 1986 and 1988 MBTA took delivery of new Type 7 light rail cars built by Kinki Sharyo, a Japanese railcar builder well established within its home country, producing its first railcars for the North American market. These cars have proven to be far more reliable and quickly assumed most of the base service on the Green Line. With the introduction of Type 7s, the MBTA was finally able to retire most of its aging PCC cars, which had to remain in service much longer than originally planned due to the unreliability of the Boeings. In order to make room for the new Kinki Sharyo Type 7 cars, Boston's MBTA instituted its first SLRV scrapping program beginning in 1987. By the end of 1988, nineteen cars had been removed from the property, most of which had been in dead storage since the late 1970s and the remainder were victims of major collisions or derailment damage. Kinki Sharyo would subsequently go on to produce LRVs for Dallas, San Jose, Phoenix, Seattle, and Los Angeles.

Boston also turned to Breda for a long-term replacement for the Boeings. While both the Boeings and Type 7 Kinki Sharyo cars have wide door openings and reserved wheelchair spaces that make them compliant with the Americans with Disabilities Act, Boston's proposed Type 8 car would have a portion of its floor lower to the ground, allowing riders using wheelchairs to board without the need for a lift or mini-high platform. To help maintain Green Line service until the Type 8s were expected to be in service and to replace Type 7s destroyed in accidents, the MBTA took delivery of an additional 20 Type 7s from Kinki Sharyo in 1997. Additionally, the MBTA contracted with Amerail (formerly Morrison Knudsen) of Hornell, NY to completely rehabilitate 55 SLRVs in 1996–97 for extended service. The SLRV rehab was intended to add an additional three to five years of service to the cars, and included the elimination of the trouble-plagued plug doors in favor of traditional folding doors, and new roof-mounted air-conditioning units. All of the unrehabilitated MBTA SLRVs were taken out of service after June 27, 1997.

The MBTA was originally expected to have fully retired their SLRVs around 2001. However, the new Type 8s had been prone to derailing and other technical defects, which had significantly delayed their entry into service, and the MBTA nearly suspended the contract; at that point, the 55 rehabilitated SLRVs were still on the active roster, nearly a third of all Green Line rolling stock. By August 2005, MBTA was down to 32 active SLRVs, and more were retired by February 2006. The issues with Type 8 cars were finally resolved in 2006, allowing production and delivery to resume. By early 2007, a sufficient number of Type 8 cars had entered service to allow total retirement of the remaining Boeings. The final revenue service run of the MBTA Boeing cars was made on March 16, 2007, on the Riverside Line by cars 3485 and 3499. By late 2007, all Type 8s had been assembled and delivered for service.

=== Muni ===
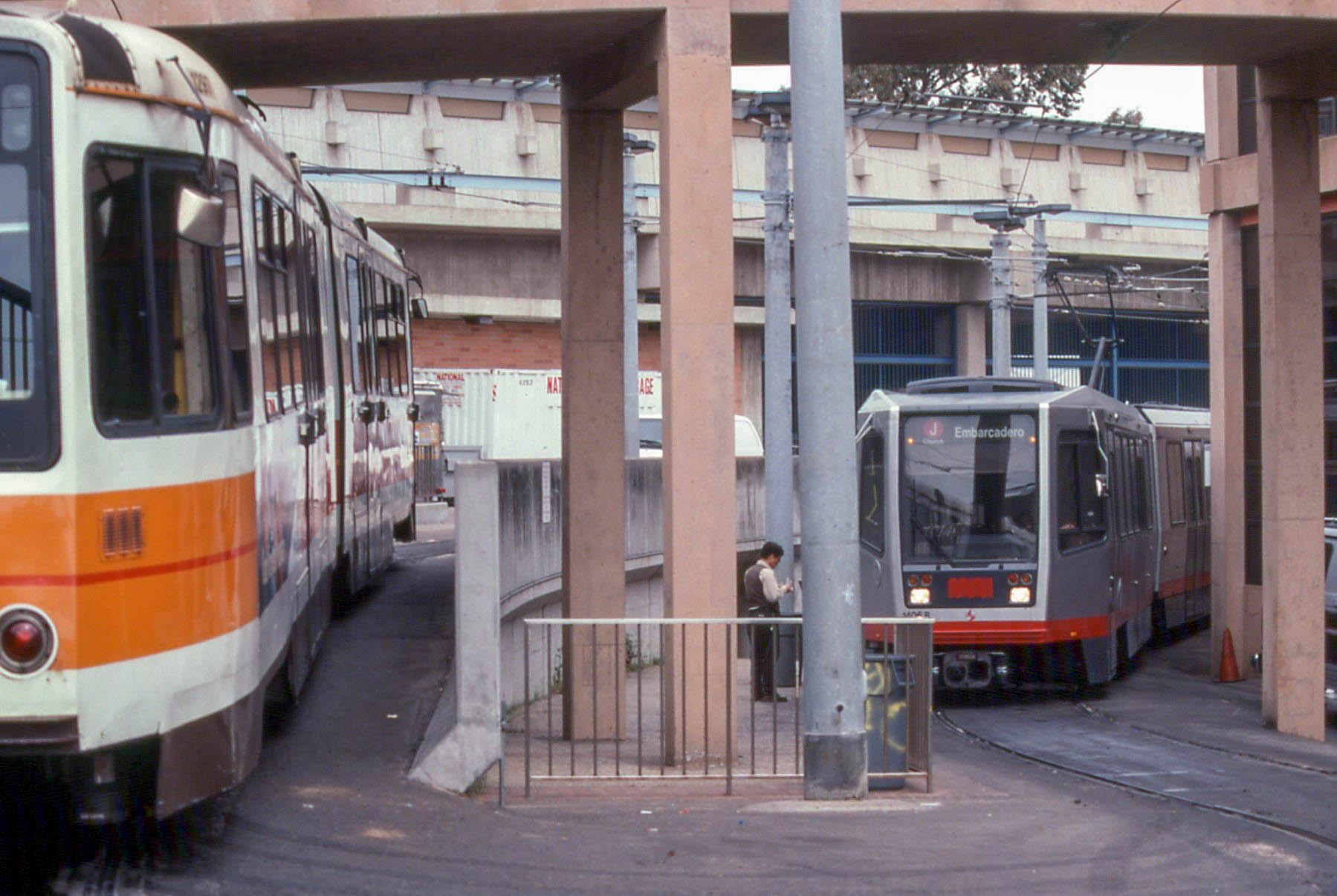
Boeing SLRV (LRV1) and Breda LRV2 at Balboa Park station (May 1997)

Muni began developing plans to procure replacements for the Boeing SLRVs in 1989. A contract was signed with Italian manufacturer Breda Costruzioni Ferroviarie on December 4, 1991, with an initial order of 35 cars and options for 20 more. San Francisco began retiring their Boeing SLRVs in 1995 after the first of their replacements (designated LRV2) arrived from Breda. The newer Breda cars are more like what Muni wanted for its Muni Metro back in the early 1970s, before the design of the Boeing SLRV.

At the end of 2001, Muni retired the last of their Boeing SLRVs after the LRV2s had proven to have improved reliability on the Muni Metro system.

In contrast, Breda would not enjoy the same success in North American light rail, producing only the P2550 for Los Angeles and the aforementioned vehicles, and slightly more success with heavy rail, producing vehicles for Los Angeles, three generations of vehicles for Washington, and Atlanta.

== Disposition ==
=== Preserved in museums ===
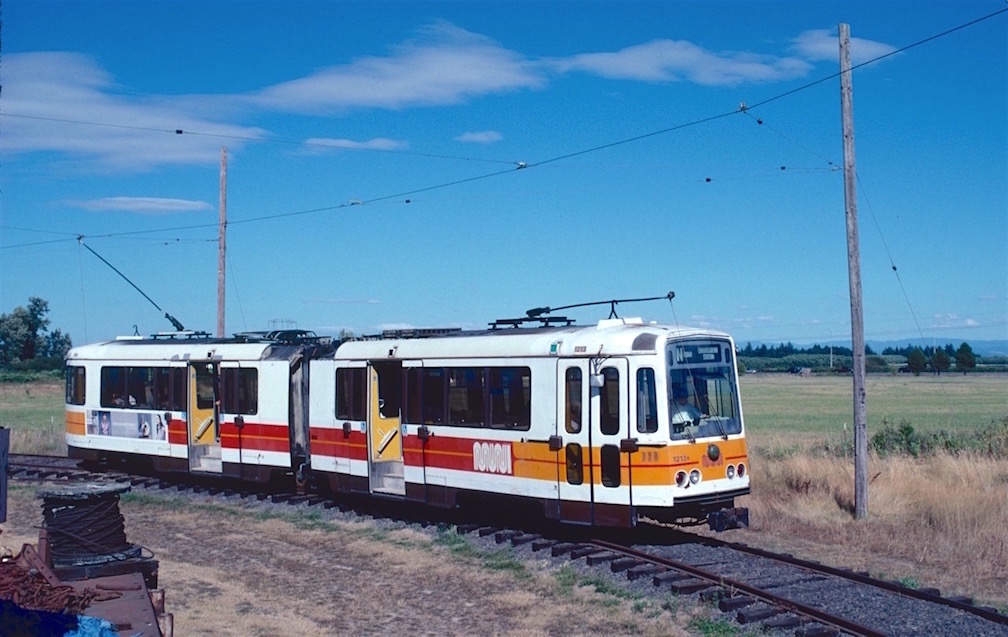
Car 1213 in operation at the Oregon Electric Railway Museum

Three US SLRVs have been saved in museums:

- ex-Muni 1213 at the Oregon Electric Railway Museum (acquired 2000)
- ex-Muni 1258 at the Western Railway Museum (acquired 2002)
- ex-MBTA 3424 at the Seashore Trolley Museum (acquired 2009)

Two others remained stored on Muni property for several years after retirement of the last cars from service, car 1320 at Geneva Division and car 1264 at the streetcar yard at Market and Duboce near the U.S. Mint (but later also moved to Geneva). These two cars remained stored until being scrapped in April 2016. Another ex-Muni car (1271) is used as an office trailer at a Bay Area scrapyard.

The Seashore Trolley Museum had inquired about acquiring MBTA 3444, which was equipped with the plug door, for their collection, but did not take it because the car was not in operating condition and Seashore wanted an operating example. 3444 was missing several essential components, including one of the trucks, and was heavily rusted. 3444 was later scrapped in 2005 and Seashore instead acquired rehabilitated car 3424, which was moved to the museum from MBTA's Riverside Yard on July 9, 2009.

=== Manchester, UK ===
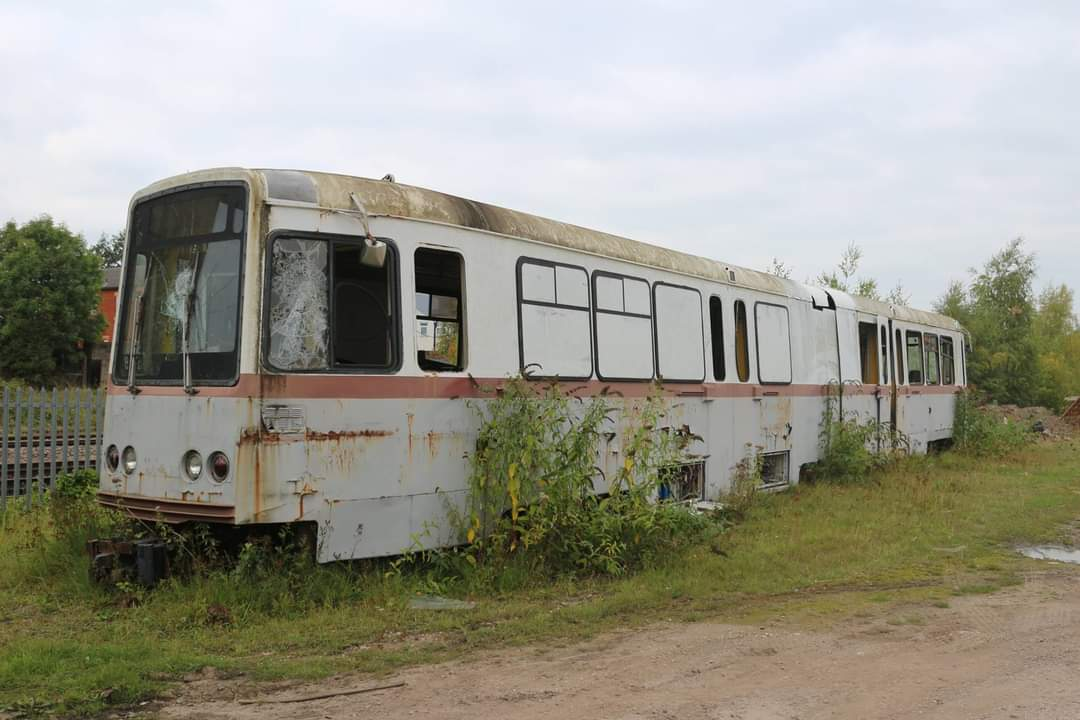
Muni 1226 stored at Derby Litchurch Lane Works

In 2002, Manchester was the host city of the Commonwealth Games. Many of the venues used for the games were served by the Manchester Metrolink, a regional light rail network which first opened in 1992. With capacity problems foreseen and thus requiring a short term solution, the Greater Manchester Passenger Transport Executive approached Muni about the possibility of buying redundant Boeing SLRVs. Two were purchased for $250 each for initial evaluation and shipped to England.

Upon arrival in England in January 2002, 1226 was sent to Derby Litchurch Lane Works for assessment by Her Majesty's Railway Inspectorate to ensure it met UK safety standards, while 1326 was delivered directly to Metrolink's Queens Road Depot. Muni cars 1214, 1219, 1220, 1221, 1234, 1249, 1268, 1288, 1305, 1308, 1312 and 1327 were stored in the US pending the sale.

Investigations concluded it was not economic to modify them for service in Manchester. The vehicle in Manchester was scrapped once the project was cancelled, while the vehicle in Derby was stored until 2016, at which point it too was broken up.

=== Working cars ===
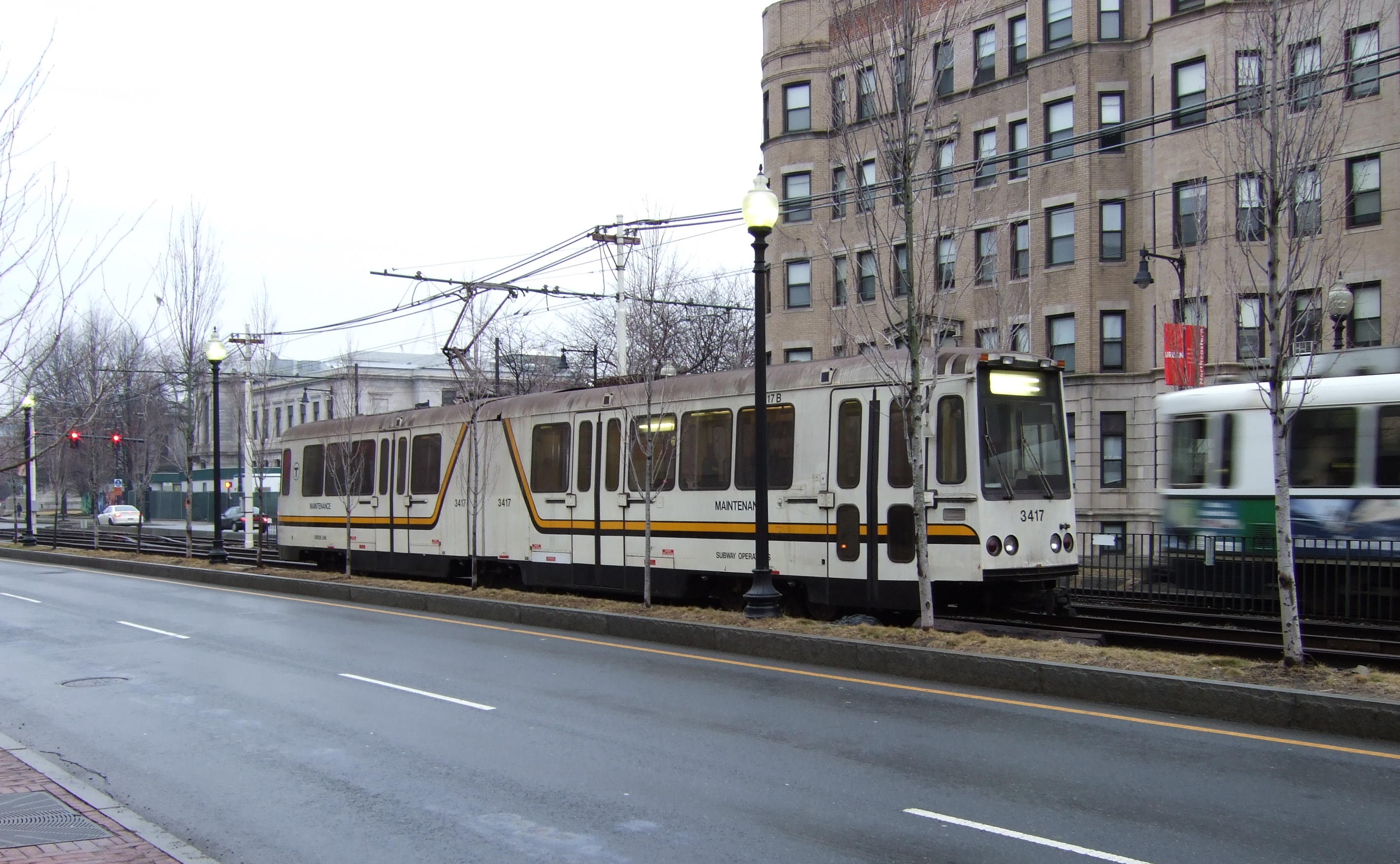
Rerailer car #3417 on the MBTA Green Line E branch in 2007

The MBTA owned three decommissioned SLRV work cars until 2020, at which time they were scrapped:

- Rerailer car 3417
- Track geometry car 3448
- Maintenance of Way car 3453

Ex-MBTA car 3541 was donated to the United States Army for training in 2000. Ex-MBTA cars 3468, 3480, 3485, 3499, 3514, and 3520 were sold to the US Government and moved to the Transportation Technology Center in Pueblo, Colorado in 2010, for testing with real-life scenarios.

== See also ==
- State-of-the-Art Car
- Canadian Light Rail Vehicle
- PCC streetcar
