= 200 Liberty Street =

Office skyscraper in Manhattan, New York

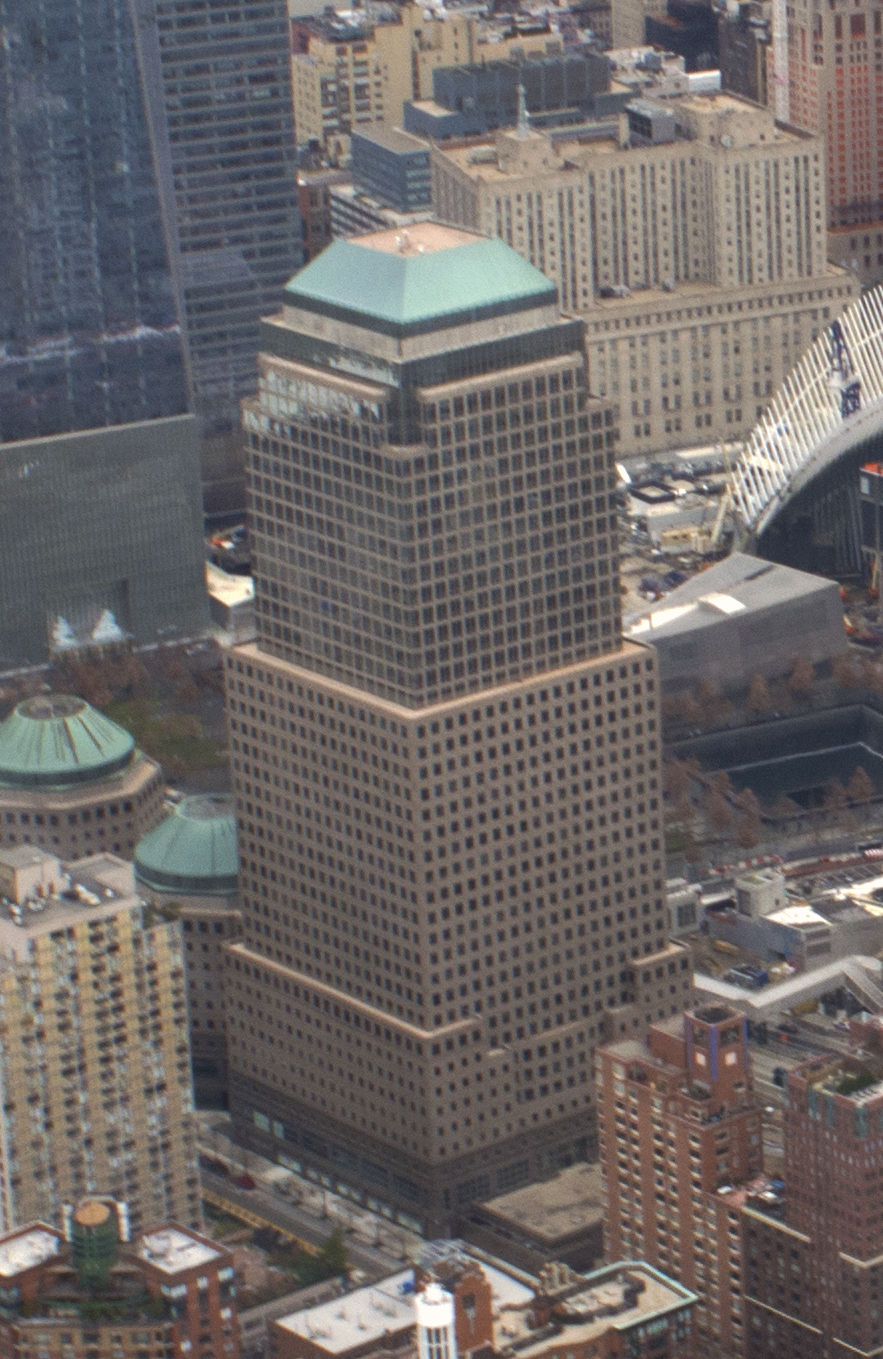
- Interactive map of the 200 Liberty Street area

General information
- Type: Office
- Location: 200 Liberty Street; New York, NY 10281, United States
- Coordinates: 40°42′38″N 74°00′56″W
- Construction started: 1984
- Completed: 1986
- Owner: Brookfield Properties

Height
- Roof: 577 ft (176 m)

Technical details
- Floor count: 40
- Floor area: 1,628,000 sq ft (151,200 m^{2})

Design and construction
- Architect: Cesar Pelli
- Structural engineer: Thornton Tomasetti

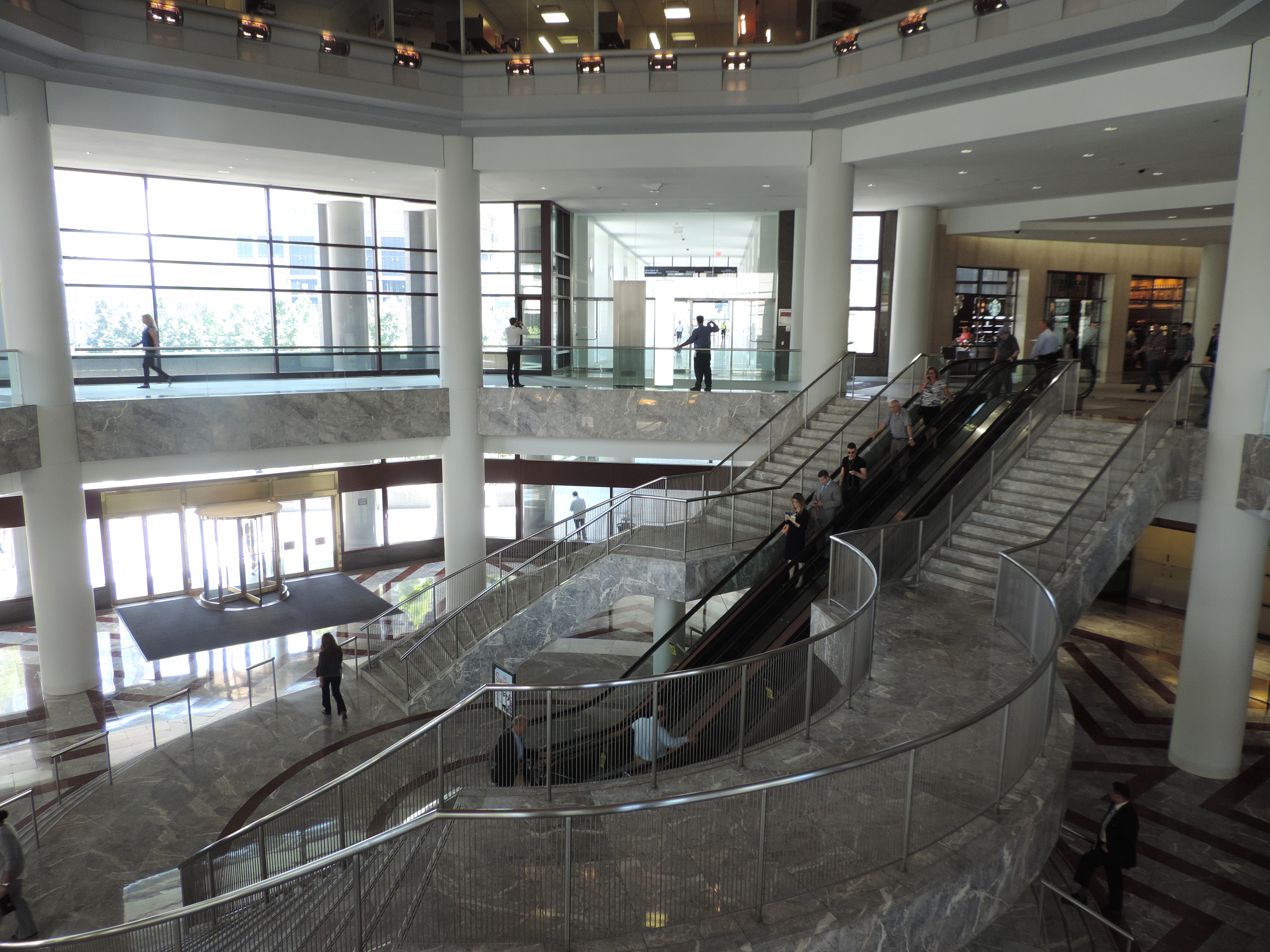
Lobby stairs

200 Liberty Street, formerly known as One World Financial Center, is one of four towers that comprise the Brookfield Place complex in the Battery Park City, directly adjacent to the Financial District of Lower Manhattan in New York City. Rising 40 floors and 577 feet (176 m), it is situated between the Hudson River and the World Trade Center. The building is on Liberty Street between South End Avenue and West Street. The building opened in 1986 as part of the World Financial Center and was designed by Cesar Pelli & Associates.

It has a leasable area of 1,628,000 square feet (151,200 m^{2}). Similarly to other WFC buildings it has a unique roof which is designed to resemble a Mastaba, which is a truncated square pyramid, and follows the theme of using ancient structures as the roofs for the rest of the WFC (the other tops are a dome, a pyramid and a stepped pyramid). It is connected to the rest of the complex by a skybridge over Liberty Street.

The building is located across the street from the World Trade Center site and was significantly damaged in the September 11 attacks. The initial dust cloud and other explosions shattered many windows, heavily damaging nearby Winter Garden Atrium and other buildings of the World Financial Center complex. It was closed for several months and reopened in 2002 after extensive restoration.

It was renamed 200 Liberty Street when the rest of the complex became Brookfield Place in 2014.

== Notable tenants ==
- Associated Press
- Cadwalader, Wickersham & Taft
- The Daily Express
- Deloitte and Touche
- Dow Jones & Co.
- Fidelity Investments
- Financial Industry Regulatory Authority
- GfK
- National Financial Services
- Northwestern Mutual
- Royal Alliance
- Santander Bank
- The Wall Street Journal
- Willis Towers Watson

== See also ==
- World Trade Center
- Brookfield Place (New York City)
- List of tallest buildings in New York City
