= Cadwalader, Wickersham & Taft =

Formerly oldest continuously operating law firm in New York City

Cadwalader, Wickersham & Taft LLP
- Headquarters: 200 Liberty Street; New York City, U.S.
- No. of offices: 5
- No. of attorneys: Approximately 400 (2022)
- Key people: Patrick Quinn, managing partner
- Revenue: $608.9 million (2021)
- Profit per equity partner: $4.38 million (2021)
- Date founded: 1792; 234 years ago
- Founder: John Wells
- Company type: LLP
- Dissolved: 30 June 2026
- Website: cadwalader.com

Cadwalader, Wickersham & Taft LLP (known as Cadwalader) was a law firm based in New York City. It was the city's oldest law firm and one of the oldest continuously operating legal practices in the United States. Attorney John Wells founded the practice in 1792. Cadwalader's Lower Manhattan headquarters is one of its five offices in three countries. In April 2026, partners of Cadwalader, Wickersham & Taft and Hogan Lovells voted to merge the two law firms to form Hogan Lovells Cadwalader.

== Overview ==
New York City's oldest law firm, Cadwalader, Wickersham & Taft was headquartered at 200 Liberty Street in Lower Manhattan. The firm's final managing partner, Patrick Quinn, oversaw approximately 400 attorneys as of 2022. It operated out of five offices across the United States and Europe. In addition to its Wall Street location, Cadwalader, Wickersham & Taft had offices in Washington, D.C., Charlotte, North Carolina, London, and Dublin. In 2021, Cadwalader generated $608.9 million in revenue, with profits per partner of $4.38 million.

== History ==
=== Founding, 18th and 19th centuries ===
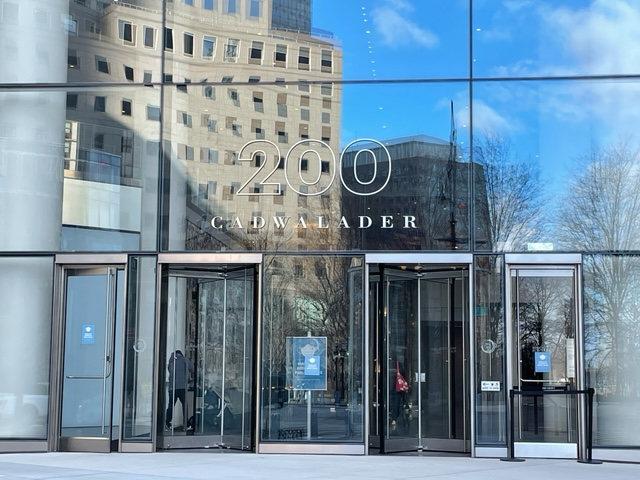
The offices of Cadwalader, Wickersham & Taft at 200 Liberty Street in New York City

In 1792, attorney John Wells, a Princeton graduate who was one of approximately 80 lawyers in New York City at the time, founded the law firm that ultimately became known as Cadwalader, Wickersham & Taft. The firm became a partnership called Wells & Strong in 1818 when George Washington Strong joined Wells' practice.

Wells' death in 1823 prompted Strong to bring in George Griffin as partner. Griffin then left in 1838 and George Washington Strong partnered with Marshall Bidwell. George Washington Strong's son, George Templeton Strong, a lawyer and noted diarist, joined the firm in 1844.

The firm became known as Strong, Bidwell & Strong and then later became Bidwell & Strong in 1855 after George Washington Strong's death. Charles E. Strong, George Templeton Strong's cousin, became the firm's chief in the 1870s. During his tenure, he considered shuttering the firm and moving from law to banking. In 1878, Strong partnered with John Lambert Cadwalader, who was assistant secretary of state during President Ulysses S. Grant's administration.

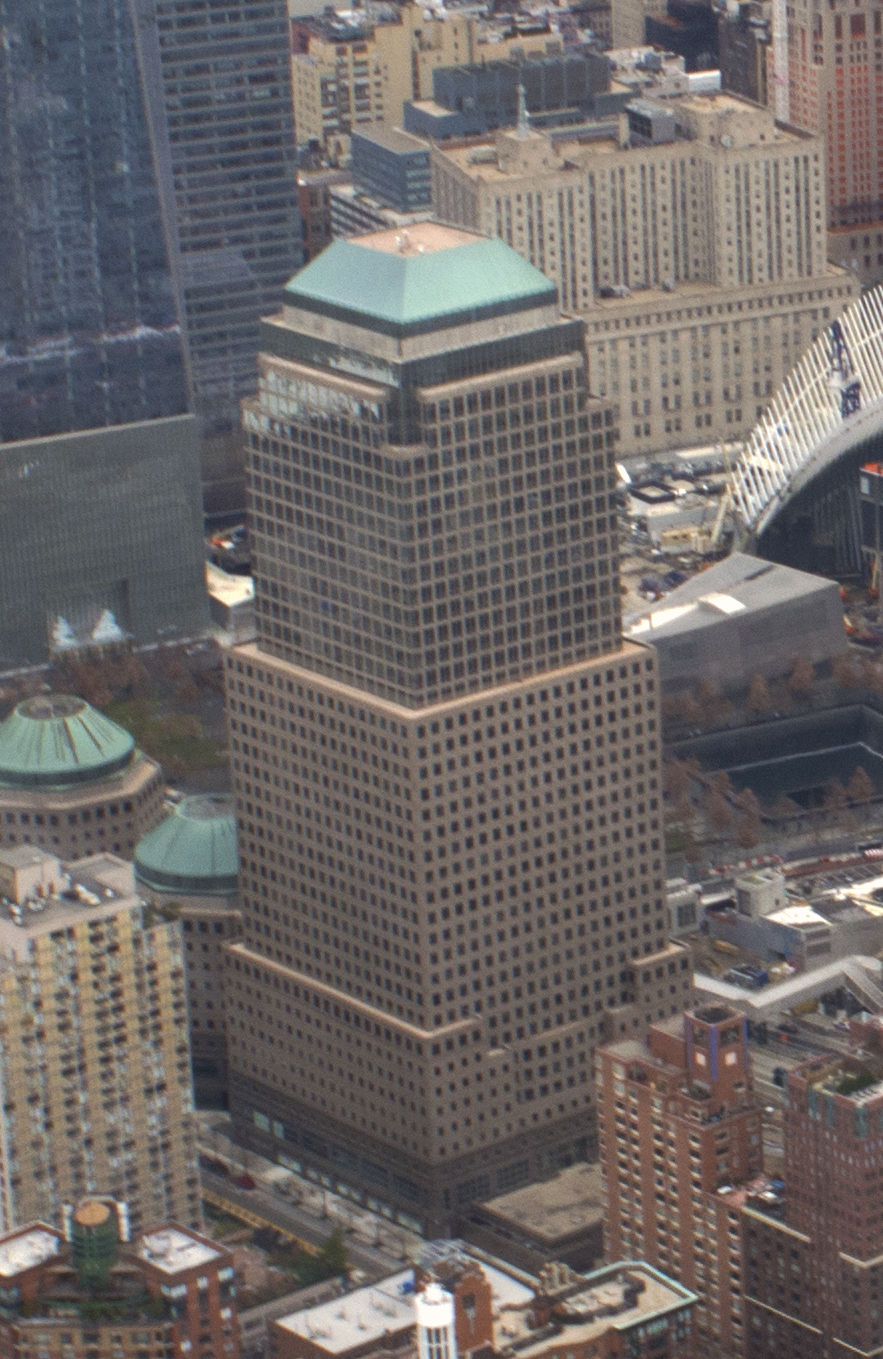
Cadwalader's global headquarters at 200 Liberty Street in New York City

George W. Wickersham, an antitrust lawyer, joined the firm in 1883 and made partner in 1887. Wickersham was named U.S. Attorney General under President William Howard Taft. Henry W. Taft, President Taft's brother, began working at Cadwalader in 1889; he became partner in 1899.

=== 20th century ===
Taft served as special assistant to the U.S. Attorney General from 1905 to 1907. The firm became known as Cadwalader, Wickersham & Taft in 1914.

In the 1930s, Cadwalader was involved with the custody trial determining the guardianship of Gloria Vanderbilt. Catherine Noyes Lee became Cadwalader's first female partner in 1942. In the 1950s, the firm was led by Cornelius W. Wickersham.

Cadwalader expanded its footprint as the firm opened an office in Charlotte, North Carolina, in 1996, established a London presence in 1997 and opened its first office in China, located in Beijing, in 2005.

In the mid-1990s, a group of partners formed what some at Cadwalader referred to as Project Rightsize, an effort from 1994 to 1995 to remove less productive partners. The group shuttered Cadwalader's office in Palm Beach, Florida, and reduced a branch in Los Angeles, California. In all, 17 partners, nearly 20 percent, left the firm. Critics said the move was driven by individuals' financial interests and two former partners successfully sued Cadwalader, Wickersham & Taft for violating its partnership agreement.

=== 21st century ===
Following the September 11 attacks, Cadwalader assisted families of those killed, including immigrant families. A portion of the firm's post-9/11 work occurred when attorneys learned there was no central resource for families seeking benefits; as a result, Cadwalader lawyers put together the "Handbook of Public and Private Assistance Resources for the Victims and Families of the World Trade Center Attacks", which was released in November 2001. The firm released an expanded version the following year.

During the 2008 financial crisis, Cadwalader reduced its number of lawyers by about 20 percent in 2008. A reporter for The Wall Street Journal suggested the move was meant to lower operating costs as demand for its services decreased. Then-Chairman W. Christopher White stated, "There was a bubble, we rode that bubble, it contracted, and we adjusted". Also during the fiscal crisis, Cadwalader attorneys served as advisers for the U.S. Treasury as Chrysler and General Motors restructured. Cadwalader expanded in China with a Hong Kong office in 2010. In 2011, the firm opened offices in Houston and Brussels.

In 2013, James C. Woolery left JP Morgan Chase for Cadwalader, Wickersham & Taft. The next year, Woolery was selected to take over as the firm's new chairman starting in 2015. In January 2015, when the chairman-elect was slated to take the chairman's post, the firm announced Woolery had left Cadwalader, Wickersham & Taft to launch a hedge fund. The firm eliminated the chairman position and Managing Partner Patrick Quinn began overseeing the firm.

In 2025, the firm agreed to a deal with Donald Trump to do 100 million dollars' worth of pro bono work on behalf of causes promoted by Trump, which was followed by mass resignations of lawyers.

On December 19, 2025, Cadwalader, Wickersham & Taft announced a merger with Hogan Lovells to form Hogan Lovells Cadwalader. The merger was approved by partner votes at both firms on April 13, 2026. The combined firm began operations in July 2026, with over 3,100 lawyers.

== Areas of practice ==
Cadwalader's practices covered varying areas of law, including: antitrust, capital markets, corporate, energy and commodities, finance, financial restructuring, financial services, health care/not-for-profit, intellectual property, litigation, tax and private wealth, and white collar defense and investigations. The firm had long-standing client relationships with premier financial institutions, Fortune 500 companies, government entities, charitable and health care organizations, and private clients. The firm also took on pro bono assignments, providing attorneys for non-profit organizations, including those assisting women, children and immigrants.

One of the firm's highest-profile pro bono clients was Nobel laureate Malala Yousafzai. Cadwalader began representing the female education activist in 2012, while she was seventeen years old and still hospitalized by a Taliban shooting. The firm continued to represent her for two years, ultimately establishing the Malala Fund, a nonprofit organization advocating for women's access to education.

== Rankings and recognition ==
Law associates surveyed for the Vault 100 law firm rankings placed Cadwalader, Wickersham & Taft at No. 53 on its 2024 list of most prestigious firms to work for. In 2015, U.S. News & World Report named Cadwalader, Wickersham & Taft "Law Firm of the Year" for derivatives and futures law. Cadwalader was ranked No. 1 on the Commercial Mortgage Alert's top issuer counsel and top underwriter counsel tables for commercial mortgage-backed securities in 2015. Additionally, the firm received recognition in 2015 for its business culture and diversity.

In 2021, The American Lawyer ranked Cadwalader, Wickersham & Taft No. 85 on the Am Law 100, an annual ranking of U.S. firms by gross revenue. The publication also classified Cadwalader as one of only twenty-four "Superrich Firms" in the United States, categorized as those generating at least $1 million in revenue per lawyer and $2 million in profits per partner.

== Notable staff ==
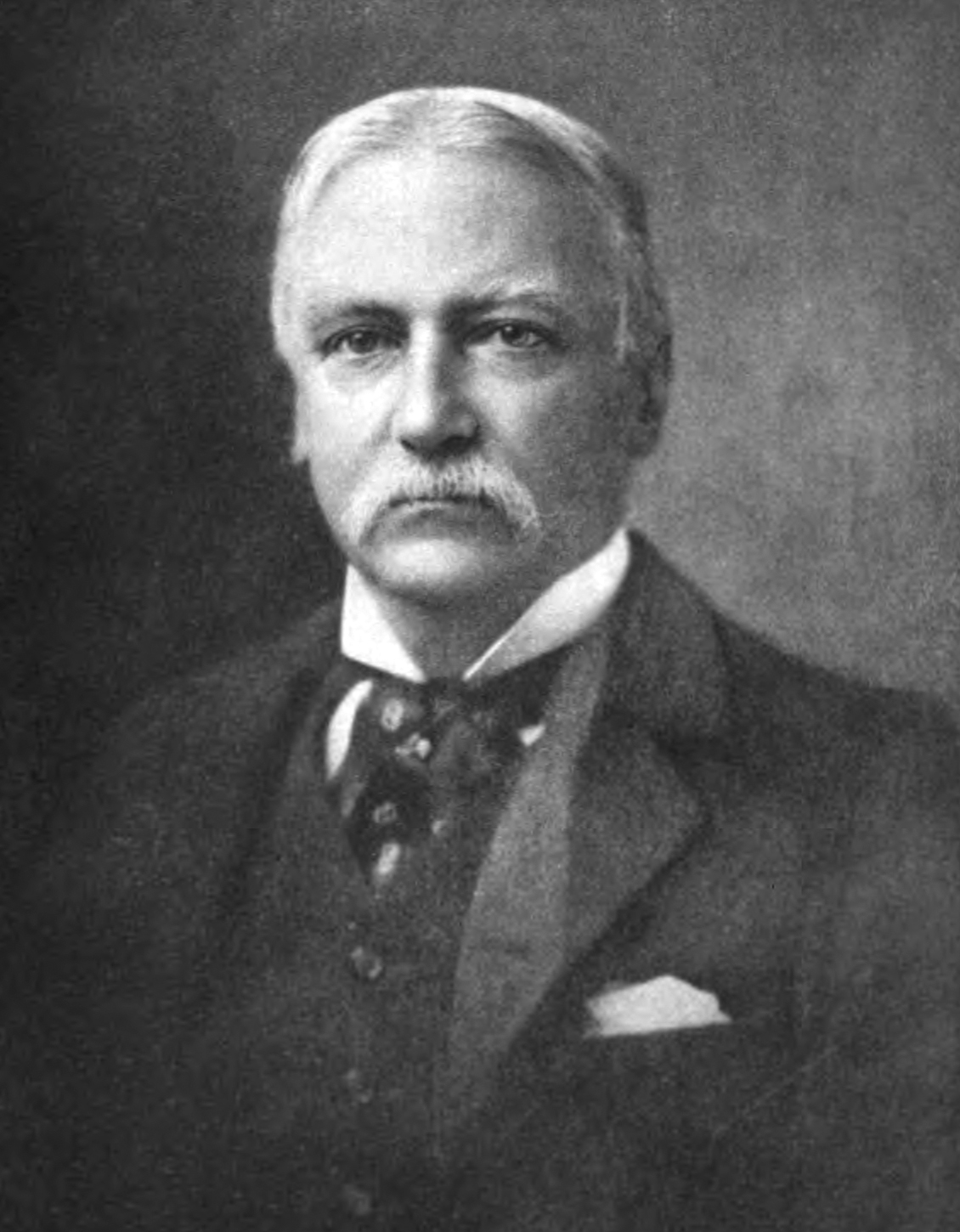
John Lambert Cadwalader

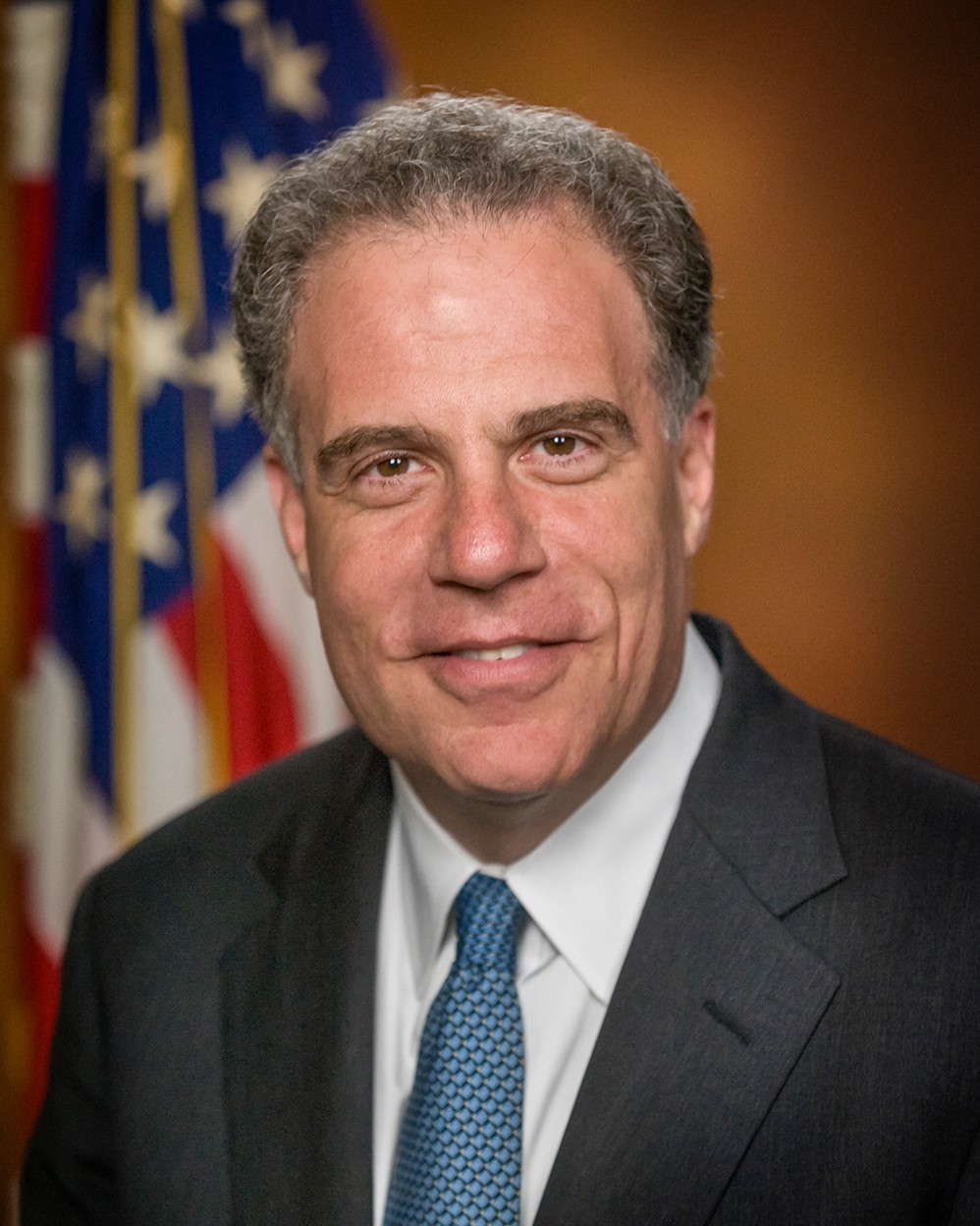
Michael E. Horowitz

- John Lambert Cadwalader, US Assistant Secretary of State, name partner of Cadwalader
- Oscar Cox, General Counsel of both the Lend-Lease Administration and the Office for Emergency Management, Assistant Solicitor General of the United States, and General Counsel of the Foreign Economic Administration.
- Michael E. Horowitz, Inspector General of the US Department of Justice
- Jonathan Kanter, assistant attorney general for the US Department of Justice Antitrust Division
- William Schwartz, law professor and Dean of the Boston University School of Law
- Stephen N. Shulman, represented Egil Krogh during the Watergate scandal, served as General Counsel of the Air Force and Chairman of the Equal Employment Opportunity Commission
- Henry Waters Taft, antitrust lawyer, name partner of Cadwalader
- Richard H. Walker, general counsel of corporate and investment banking at Deutsche Bank, and director of the SEC Division of Enforcement
- Charlie Wang, lawyer and CEO of car companies
- George W. Wickersham, US Attorney General in the administration of President William H. Taft, President of the Council on Foreign Relations
- Todd Blanche 88th United States attorney general

== See also ==
- List of largest United States-based law firms by profits per partner
