= Osaic =

American brokerage

- Formerly: Advisor Group
- Type: Private
- Industry: Financial Services
- Founded: 2002; 24 years ago
- Headquarters: Scottsdale, Arizona, United States
- Key people: Jamie Price (CEO), Shannon Reid (President)
- Number of employees: 2500 (Q3 2025)
- Website: osaic.com

Osaic, formerly known as Advisor Group, is an American wealth management firm. The firm serves approximately 11,000 financial professionals and over 250 financial institutions managing more than $700 billion in assets. While Osaic was initially a network of independent broker-dealers, in 2023, the company began the process to integrate all the firms under the Osaic brand and service platform, which it completed in early 2025. Osaic also has four Advantage Companies: Highland Capital Brokerage, Ladenberg Thalmann & Co., Inc., Ladenberg Thalmann Asset Management, and Premier Trust.

Though its headquarters is in Scottsdale, AZ, the firm has locations across the U.S. including Oakdale, MN; La Vista, NE; New York, NY; Jersey City, NJ; and Atlanta, GA. Osaic is a portfolio company of Reverence Capital Partners.

== History ==
=== Early History & AIG Era (1988-2016) ===
The firm was originally founded in 1988 as SunAmerica Planning Centers, Inc., with roots in a financial services firm in Baltimore, Maryland, established to assist clients with financial and retirement planning. In 1999, the company was acquired by American International Group (AIG). This acquisition led to the creation of the AIG Advisor Group in 2002, marking its entry into the independent broker-dealer space.

=== The Advisor Group Era (2016-2023) ===
In 2016, a significant change occurred when private equity firms Lightyear Capital, LLC and PSP Investments purchased the then-named AIG Advisor Group from AIG. This sale marked the beginning of a new chapter for the company. In 2019, Reverence Capital Partners acquired a 75% stake in Advisor Group for $2.3 billion, further solidifying its position in the market.

=== Key Acquisitions & Growth ===
The firm's growth accelerated through a series of strategic acquisitions.

2019-2020: Ladenburg Thalmann In November 2019, Advisor Group announced a major acquisition of Ladenburg Thalmann Financial Services, valued at $1.3 billion. This deal was a significant milestone, and upon its closing in the first half of 2020, it propelled the combined entity to become the second-largest broker-dealer in the United States.

2022: Infinex and American Portfolios The company continued its expansion in 2022 with two key acquisitions. In May, Osaic acquired Infinex Financial Holdings, a firm specializing in providing financial services to banks and credit unions. This was quickly followed by the acquisition of New York-based American Portfolios Financial Services in June, further broadening its network and reach.

In December 2023, Osaic acquired Lincoln National Corporation's wealth management business for an undisclosed amount, adding a substantial number of financial professionals to its network.

In June 2025, Osaic acquired CW Advisors, LLC for an undisclosed amount, continuing its growth trajectory.

=== The Rebrand to Osaic (2023) ===
In 2023, Advisor Group announced its new name, Osaic. This name change was part of a larger, multi-month strategy to rebrand its various subsidiary firms and networks into a single, cohesive entity, streamlining its identity and operations under one brand.

== Women in all positions ==
The firm has a pledge to interview at least one qualified female candidate for every open position. As of 2024, 7 out of 21 senior executive positions at Osaic were filled by women leaders who were promoted internally or hired externally.

As of 2024, 16% of all Osaic financial professionals were women.
