= William Schwartz (law professor) =

American law professor and corporate director (1933–2017)

William Schwartz (May 6, 1933 – December 20, 2017) was an American law professor and corporate director. He graduated magna cum laude in 1955 with a J.D. from the Boston University School of Law.

== Life and career ==
Schwartz was born on May 6, 1933. He was professor of law at Boston University from 1955 to 1991, and Dean of the Boston University School of Law from 1980 to 1988. He was Vice President for Academic Affairs (Chief Academic Officer) at Yeshiva University between 1993 and 1998, and served as Professor of property law at the Cardozo School of Law at Yeshiva. He was a professor of Law at Boston University, and a faculty member at the Frances Glessner Lee Institute of the Harvard Medical School. He became the first honorary member of the National College of Probate Judges, was a member of the Legal Advisory Board of the New York Stock Exchange, and served in the Office of Public Information of the United Nations.

Schwartz was a corporate director of Viacom from 2006, having served for Former Viacom from 1987. He was counsel in the New York office of Cadwalader, Wickersham & Taft in New York City since 1988, where he concentrated on trusts and estates, business law and family law.

Schwartz died on December 20, 2017, at the age of 84.
