= Type 9 (disambiguation) =

Type 9 may refer to:

- Type 9 wooden anti-tank mine, an Italian mine used during World War II
- The British and Colonial Aeroplane Company Type 9, a prototype of the Bristol F.2 Fighter
- Ford Type 9 transmission, in production 1982–1988
- MBTA CAF USA Type 9, a class of light rail vehicle built 2017–2019
- Peugeot Type 9, an automobile built 1894–1897
- Proprotein convertase subtilisin/kexin type 9, a protein found in humans

== See also ==
- Class 10 (disambiguation)
- Model 10 (disambiguation)
