= Type 10 (disambiguation) =

Type 10 is a main battle tank used by the Japan Ground Self-Defense Force.

Type 10 may also refer to:

- Type 10 grenade, a fragmentation hand grenade of the Imperial Japanese Army
- Type 10 grenade discharger, a World War II infantry mortar
- Type 10 and Type 3 rocket boosters, Japanese World War II rocket artillery systems
- Type 10 120 mm AA gun, a Japanese World War II gun
- Belgian State Railways Type 10, a class of steam locomotives built 1910–1914
- Bugatti Type 10, a prototype car 1908–1909
- MBTA CAF USA Type 10, a class of light rail vehicles to be built from 2026 onward
- Mitsubishi Navy Type 10 Carrier Attack Aircraft, a 1920s Japanese aircraft
- Mitsubishi Navy Type 10 Carrier Fighter, a 1920s Japanese aircraft
- Mitsubishi Navy Type 10 Carrier Reconnaissance Aircraft, a 1920s Japanese aircraft
- Peugeot Type 10, a car produced 1894–1896
- Yokosuka Navy Type 10 Reconnaissance Seaplane, a 1920s Japanese aircraft
- QBU-10, also known as the Type 10 or Shin 10 rifle

== See also ==
- Type X (disambiguation)
- Class 10 (disambiguation)
- Model 10 (disambiguation)
