= MBTA CAF USA Type 9 =

Low-floor light rail vehicle

Type 9 LRV
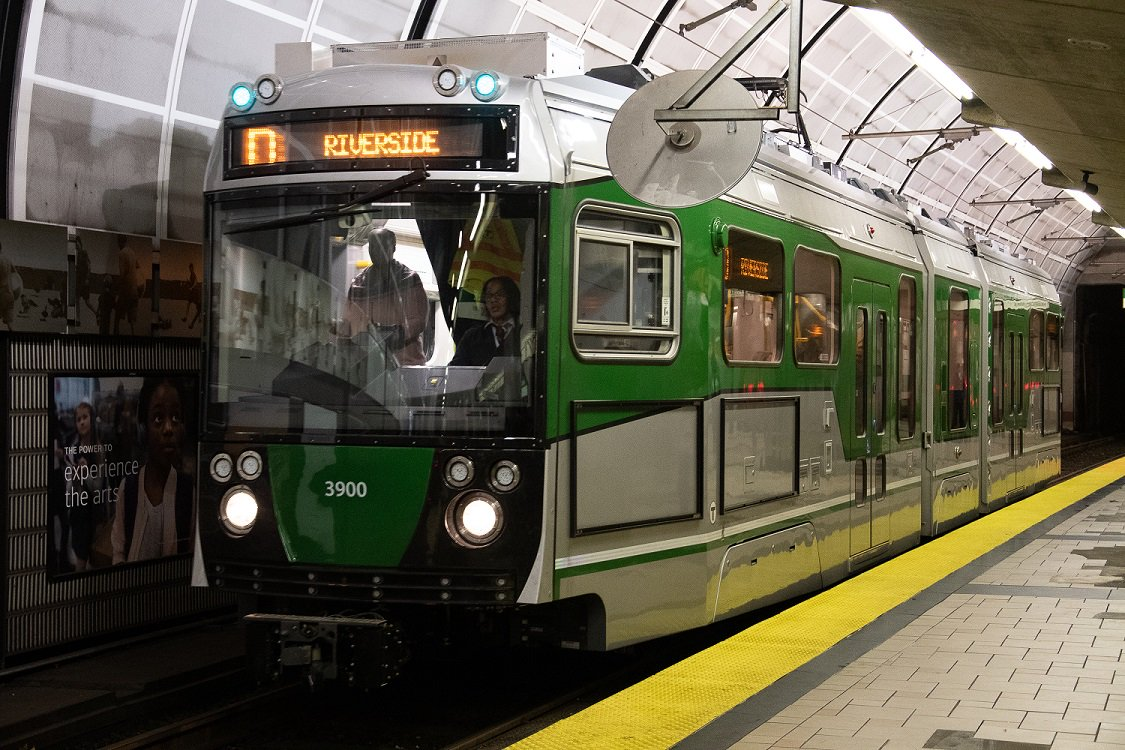
- No. 3900, the first Type 9 built, at North Station

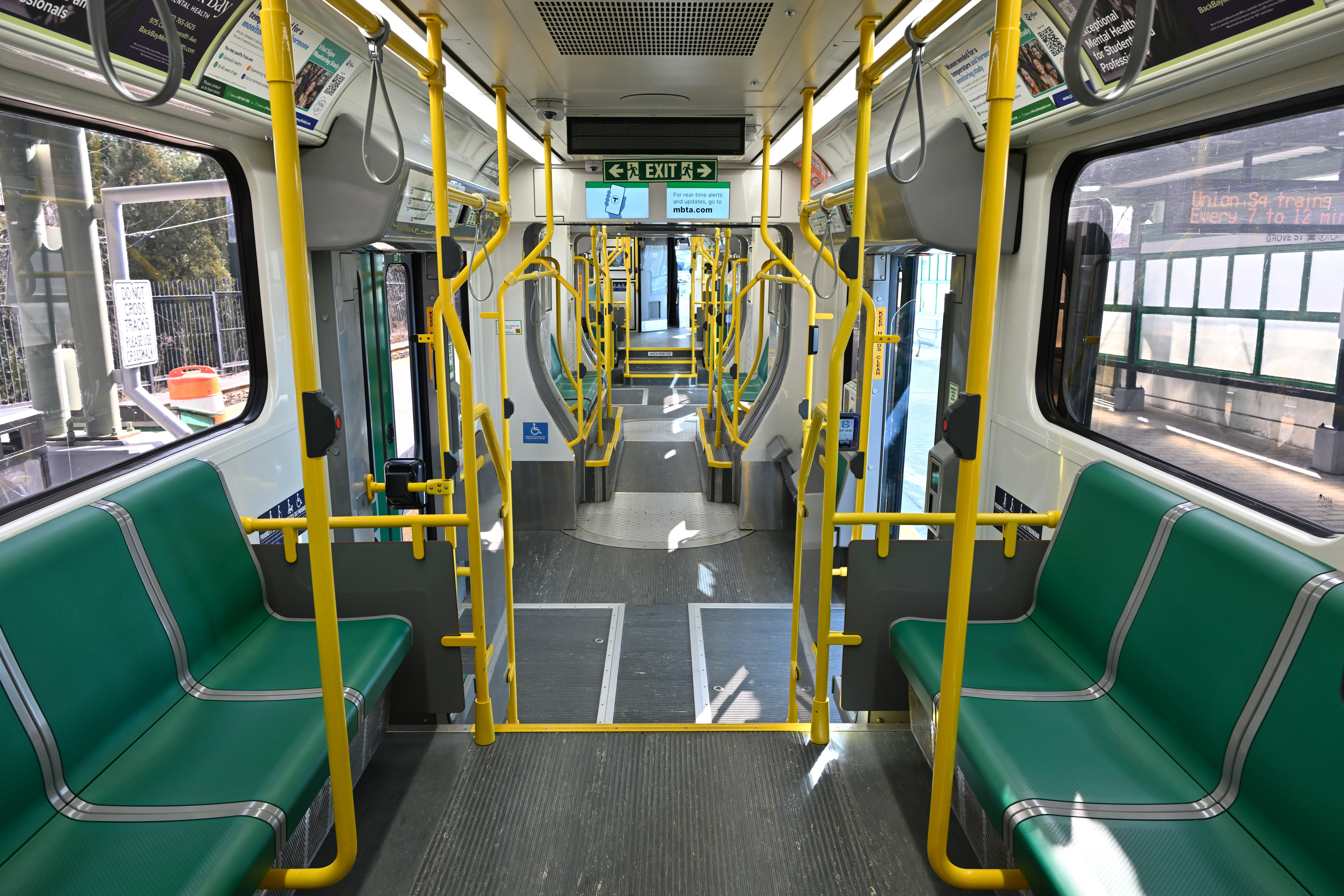
- Interior of a Type 9
- Stock type: Low-floor light rail vehicle
- Manufacturer: CAF USA
- Assembly: Elmira, New York
- Constructed: 2017–2019
- Entered service: December 21, 2018
- Number built: 24
- Number in service: 24
- Predecessor: MBTA AnsaldoBreda Type 8, MBTA Kinki Sharyo Type 7
- Formation: Mc-T-Mc
- Fleet numbers: 3900–3923
- Capacity: 44 seats; 212 total
- Operator: Massachusetts Bay Transportation Authority
- Line served: Green Line

Specifications
- Car length: 72 ft 0 in (21,946 mm)
- Width: 104 in (2,600 mm)
- Low-floor: 70%
- Entry: Level
- Articulated sections: 3
- Weight: 86,000 lb (39,000 kg)
- Electric systems: Overhead line, 600 V DC
- Current collection: Pantograph
- UIC classification: Bo′+2′+Bo′
- AAR wheel arrangement: B-2-B
- Safety system: Crash energy management
- Track gauge: 1,435 mm (4 ft 8 1/2 in)

The Type 9 LRV is a class of low-floor light rail vehicles manufactured by Construcciones y Auxiliar de Ferrocarriles (CAF) for the MBTA Green Line. The fleet of 24 Type 9 cars was ordered in 2014 for the Green Line Extension project, and the first cars began service in 2018. Final assembly for the Type 9 cars was performed in Elmira, New York, from body shells built in Spain.

== Background ==
The Green Line is a light rail system in Greater Boston, Massachusetts, which operates four lines that serve the city's western and northern inner suburbs via Downtown Boston. The Green Line's four services, the B, C, D, and E Branches, use infrastructure that is descended from the Boston streetcar system, with portions of the system dating back to 1897. The Green Line is one of the most-used light rail systems in the United States, serving over 101,000 passengers per day in 2023.

The state of Massachusetts committed to extending the Green Line in 1991, as part of a settlement related to the impacts of the Big Dig, but construction work on the Green Line Extension did not begin until 2012. To operate service on the 4.3 mi (6.9 km) extension, the MBTA needed 24 additional vehicles.

The MBTA's light rail vehicle types follow the nomenclature of the Boston Elevated Railway, which operated five series of cars. The numbering resumed with the unbuilt Type 6 prototype in the late 1960s, and continued with the custom-designed Type 7 and Type 8 of the 1980s and 1990s respectively.

== History ==
The MBTA began the procurement process for the Type 9 LRVs in tandem with the planning for the Green Line Extension. The MBTA sought a different manufacturer for the Type 9 than its predecessor the Type 8, which was built by Italian firm AnsaldoBreda. The Type 8 cars were prone to derailments and breakdowns, and were the subject of multiple disputes between AnsaldoBreda and the MBTA. In response to the difficulties faced with the Type 8 fleet, the MBTA revised its procurement practices, focusing on project management by internal staff. The MBTA also committed to providing equipment manufacturers with more precise specifications of its infrastructure, which is unique due to its age and condition.

A request for proposals for the Type 9 cars was issued in 2011, and two manufacturers placed a bid. In May 2014, CAF USA, the American subsidiary of Spanish firm Construcciones y Auxiliar de Ferrocarriles, was selected to construct the new LRVs. The total cost of the 24-car fleet was $118 million, or $4.92 million per car. Initially, the new cars would be delivered from the end of 2017 to the end of 2018. Buy America regulations meant that the bodyshells of the cars were manufactured in Spain, with final assembly at Elmira, New York.

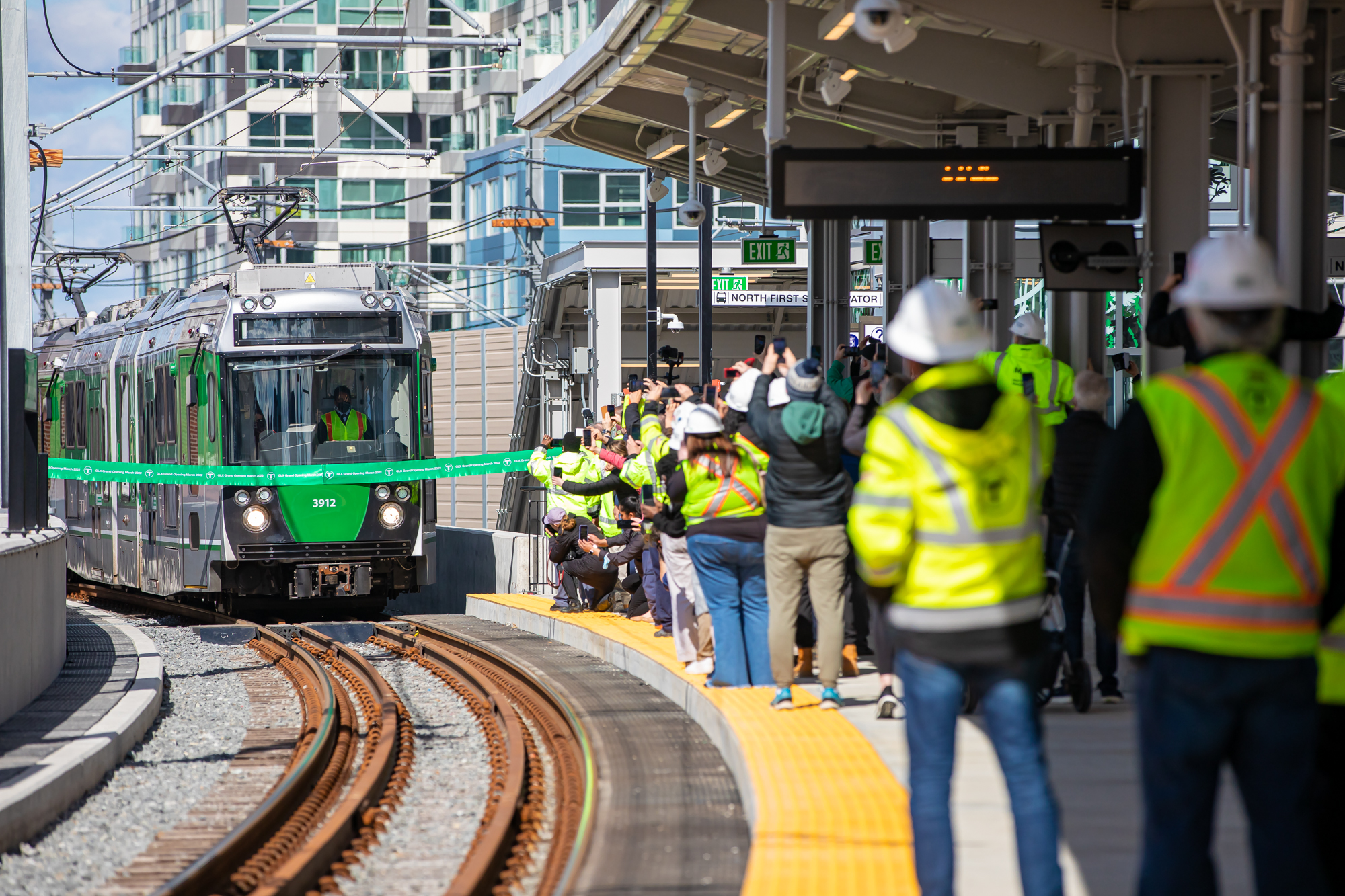
Type 9 at the opening of the rebuilt Lechmere station in March 2022

The first car was delivered to the MBTA for testing in March 2018. Governor Charlie Baker and Massachusetts Department of Transportation Secretary Stephanie Pollack took a ceremonial first ride on the Type 9 cars in July of that year, and the cars began regular service on December 21. The remaining 23 LRVs were delivered in 2018–2020 and entered service in 2019–2021. The Green Line Extension opened in phases in 2022, years behind schedule.

== Features and specifications ==
The Type 9 cars introduce new features for safety, efficiency, and passenger experience. They are the first light rail vehicles in the United States to incorporate crash energy management technology, a form of crumple zone that protects the train operator and passengers in a collision. The Type 9 cars are fitted with positive train control equipment, to be used with the future Green Line Train Protection System.

Accessibility features include improved bridge plates for faster step-free boarding, and larger reserved areas for users of wheelchairs and strollers. The Type 9 cars are also fitted with sliding plug doors.

The Type 9 cars operate in one and two-car trains in regular service. Type 9 cars are only capable of operating with other Type 9 cars in regular service, unlike their predecessors, which are compatible across multiple models. The Type 9 cars are still capable of pushing or towing other car models in an emergency.

== Safety concerns ==
The Federal Transit Administration conducted a comprehensive safety inspection of the MBTA rail system in 2022, and criticized the MBTA for insufficient safety procedures. The inspection report concluded that the MBTA's understaffed safety department was not properly involved in capital projects, which should be subject to a rigorous safety certification process. The report highlighted the Type 9 cars as an example of this lack of supervision, and criticized the safety certification for the Type 9's brakes as insufficient.

On April 17, 2023, the day of the 2023 Boston Marathon, a Type 9 train broke down at Boylston station, disrupting Green Line service through downtown Boston for hours. A misaligned floor panel in the center section of a Type 9 car buckled under load, requiring the train to be evacuated. All Type 9 cars were removed from service for inspections, returning to service shortly afterwards.

== Future ==
Their successors, dubbed the Type 10, will be built by CAF, and will replace the entire mainline fleet of Type 7s, Type 8s, and Type 9s by the early 2030s. Following the introduction of the Type 10 cars, the Type 9 cars are expected to be reassigned to the Mattapan Line. They will replace the Mattapan Line's current fleet of PCC streetcars, which were built in the mid-1940s and have been continually rebuilt since. The infrastructure of the Mattapan Line will need to be modified for the Type 9 cars, which are longer and heavier than the PCC cars. The plans for replacing the PCC cars on the Mattapan Line have caused controversy, with some figures advocating for the PCC cars to be retained, and others arguing that they are long overdue for replacement.

== See also ==
- US Standard Light Rail Vehicle
- MBTA Kinki Sharyo Type 7
- MBTA AnsaldoBreda Type 8
- Green Line Extension
