= X-type =

X-type may refer to:

- Jaguar X-Type, an entry-level luxury car that was manufactured and marketed by Jaguar Cars
- X-type asteroid
- LGOC X-type, an early model of London double-decker bus
- X-type histiocytosis, a clinically well-defined group of cutaneous syndromes characterized by infiltrates of Langerhans cells

== See also ==
- Type X
