= X class =

X class or Class X may refer to:

== Automobiles ==
- Mercedes-Benz X-Class, a luxury pickup truck

== Rail transport ==
- NCC Class X, a class of steam locomotives used in Northern Ireland
- NER Class X, a class of steam locomotives used on the North Eastern Railway of Britain
- Nilgiri Mountain Railway X class, a class of rack and pinion steam locomotives used in India
- NZR X class, a class of steam locomotives used by the New Zealand Railways Department
- South Australian Railways X class, a class of steam locomotives used by the South Australian Railways
- TGR X class, a class of diesel-electric locomotives used by the Tasmanian Government Railways
- Victorian Railways X class, a class of steam locomotives used by the Victorian Railways in Australia
- Victorian Railways X class (1886), a class of steam locomotives used by the Victorian Railways in Australia
- Victorian Railways X class (diesel), a class of diesel locomotives used by the Victorian Railways in Australia
- WAGR X class, a class of diesel locomotives used in Western Australia
- X-class Melbourne tram
- X1-class Melbourne tram
- X2-class Melbourne tram

== Ships ==
- X-class submarine, a British midget submarine
- X-class lifeboat, operated by the RNLI

== Model yachts ==
- San Francisco Model Yacht Club X Class, a model yacht class

== Drones ==
- X Class drone racing, which is a name used for first-person view (radio control) giant drone racing

== Other uses ==
- Tenth grade, Class X, secondary education in countries such as India and Indonesia.
- X is the class of solar flares with the highest peak soft X-ray flux

== See also ==
- Class 10 (disambiguation)
