= Type X =

Type X may refer to:

- Typex, or Type X, British cipher machines used from 1937
- Taito Type X, an arcade system board
- Type X submarine, a special type of German U-boat
- Grahame-White Type X, a 1910s British passenger-carrying biplane
- Type X, a category of fire-resistant drywall
- Type-X (unmanned ground vehicle), a robotic combat vehicle by Milrem Robotics
- Type X, a European copper tubing standard
- Type X, one of the UIC passenger coach types

== See also ==
- X-Type
- Type 10 (disambiguation)
