= MBTA CAF USA Type 10 =

Low-floor light rail vehicle

Type 10 LRV
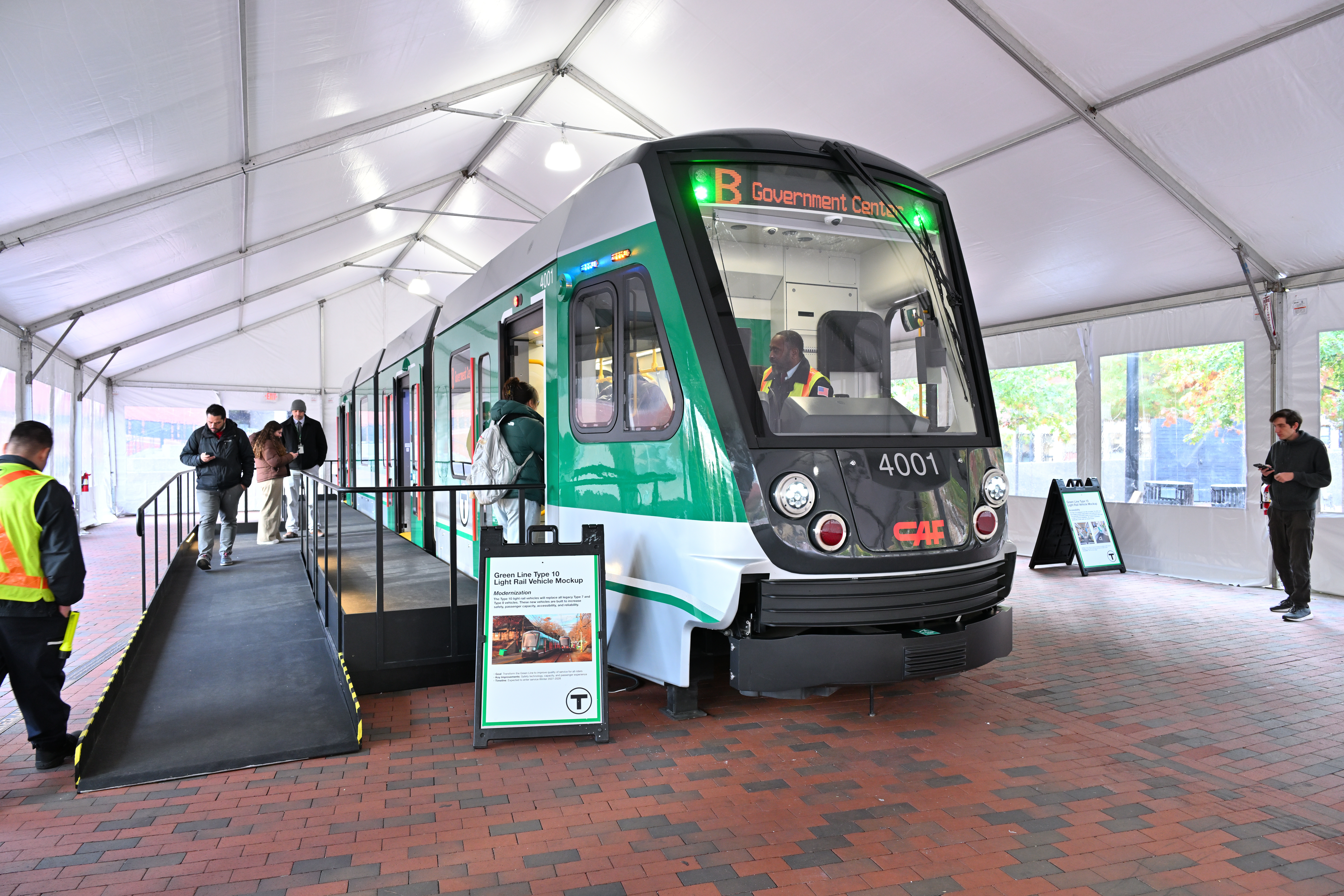
- Full-scale mockup of a Type 10
- Stock type: Low-floor light rail vehicle
- Manufacturer: CAF USA
- Assembly: Elmira, New York
- Number under construction: 101
- Number built: 1
- Predecessor: MBTA Kinki Sharyo Type 7, MBTA AnsaldoBreda Type 8, MBTA CAF USA Type 9
- Formation: Mc-S-M-S-M-S-Mc
- Fleet numbers: 4001-4102
- Capacity: 400 passengers
- Operator: Massachusetts Bay Transit Authority
- Line served: Green Line

Specifications
- Car length: 113 ft 8.4 in (34,656 mm)
- Width: 104 in (2,600 mm)
- Low-floor: 100%
- Entry: Level
- Articulated sections: 7
- Traction system: CAF VVVF
- Traction motors: TSA TMR 36-18-4
- Electric systems: Overhead line, 600 V DC
- Current collection: Pantograph
- UIC classification: Bo′+0′+Bo′+0′+Bo′+0′+Bo′
- AAR wheel arrangement: B-B-B-B
- Track gauge: 1,435 mm (4 ft 8 1/2 in)

The Type 10 LRV is a low-floor light rail vehicle manufactured by Construcciones y Auxiliar de Ferrocarriles (CAF) for the MBTA Green Line in Greater Boston, Massachusetts. The Type 10 cars are 54% longer than the existing rolling stock of the Green Line, and will be equipped with new safety and accessibility features.

The MBTA ordered 102 Type 10 cars in late 2022, at a cost of $810 million. The cars are expected to enter service in 2027, and will replace the Type 7 and Type 8 cars. The MBTA is marketing the Type 10 as "supercars" due to their longer length and 100% low-floor design.

== Background ==
The Green Line is a light rail system in Greater Boston, Massachusetts, serving the city's western and northern inner suburbs via Downtown Boston. The Green Line's four services, the B, C, D, and E branches, use infrastructure that is descended from the Boston streetcar system, with portions of the system dating back to 1897. The Green Line is one of the most-used light rail systems in the United States, serving over 101,000 passengers per day in 2023.

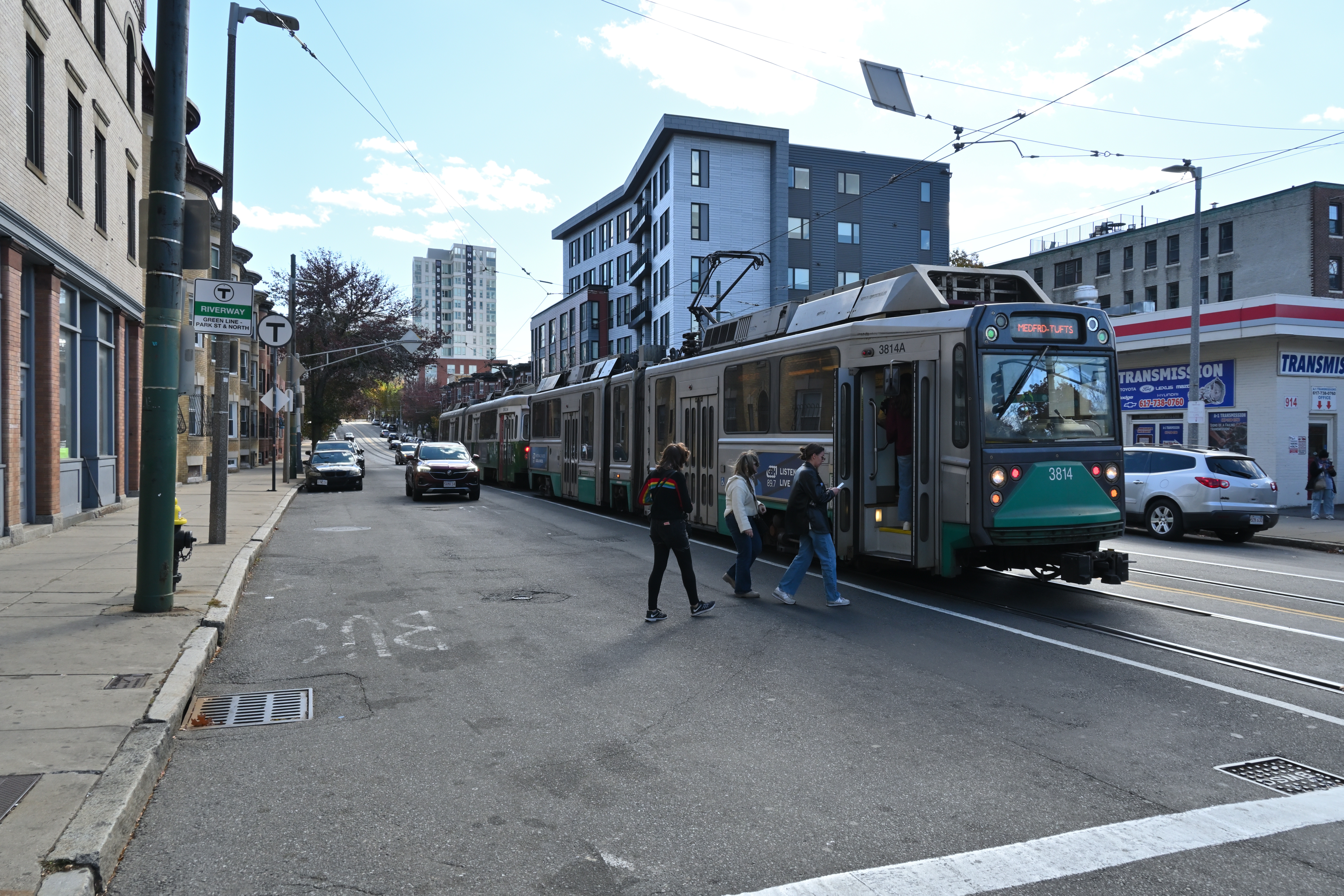
Limitations of the current Green Line infrastructure: passengers walk through traffic and line up at the front door to board at Riverway

The Green Line's infrastructure and capacity are limited by the system's origins as a streetcar system. A segment of the E Branch on Huntington Avenue uses street running in mixed traffic, and the system's storage facilities are direct descendants of historic car barns. Terminal stations and storage facilities feature tight balloon loops for turning around trains, which constrain the physical dimensions of Green Line cars. Multiple-car trains have an operator in each car, a rarity among modern light rail systems.

Some of the infrastructure limitations were addressed by the Green Line Extension in the early 2020s. The Green Line Extension project removed the 42 ft (13 m) radius loop at Lechmere station and reinforced the Lechmere Viaduct to carry heavier trains. These physical modifications allowed the MBTA to change their specifications for future Green Line rolling stock orders. To operate service on the Green Line Extension, the MBTA ordered 24 Type 9 cars from Construcciones y Auxiliar de Ferrocarriles. The order was placed in 2014, and the cars began service in late 2018, ahead of the 2022 opening of the Green Line Extension. The Type 9 cars were similar to their predecessor Type 8 cars, but the MBTA sought a different design for its next fleet of Green Line cars.

== Concepts ==
The MBTA considered 7 concepts for new Green Line cars in a 2018 study, which would take advantage of future modifications to the Green Line's infrastructure. All of the concepts proposed a longer vehicle than the current Type 8/9 cars, with lengths ranging from 100 to 131 ft (30 to 40 m). The MBTA's final concept for the new cars was a 114-foot (35 m) articulated low-floor light rail vehicle made up of 7 segments, riding on 4 trucks, and equipped with 5 sliding doors on each side.

To operate the concept light rail vehicles, the MBTA found that infrastructure modifications would be required at multiple locations in the Green Line system. In addition to the work at Lechmere, the Park Street, Boston College, and Heath Street stations would need modifications, and the Lake Street and Reservoir yards would have to be reconfigured. The street running section of the E Branch would need to be converted to private right-of-way, which would also be used by buses.

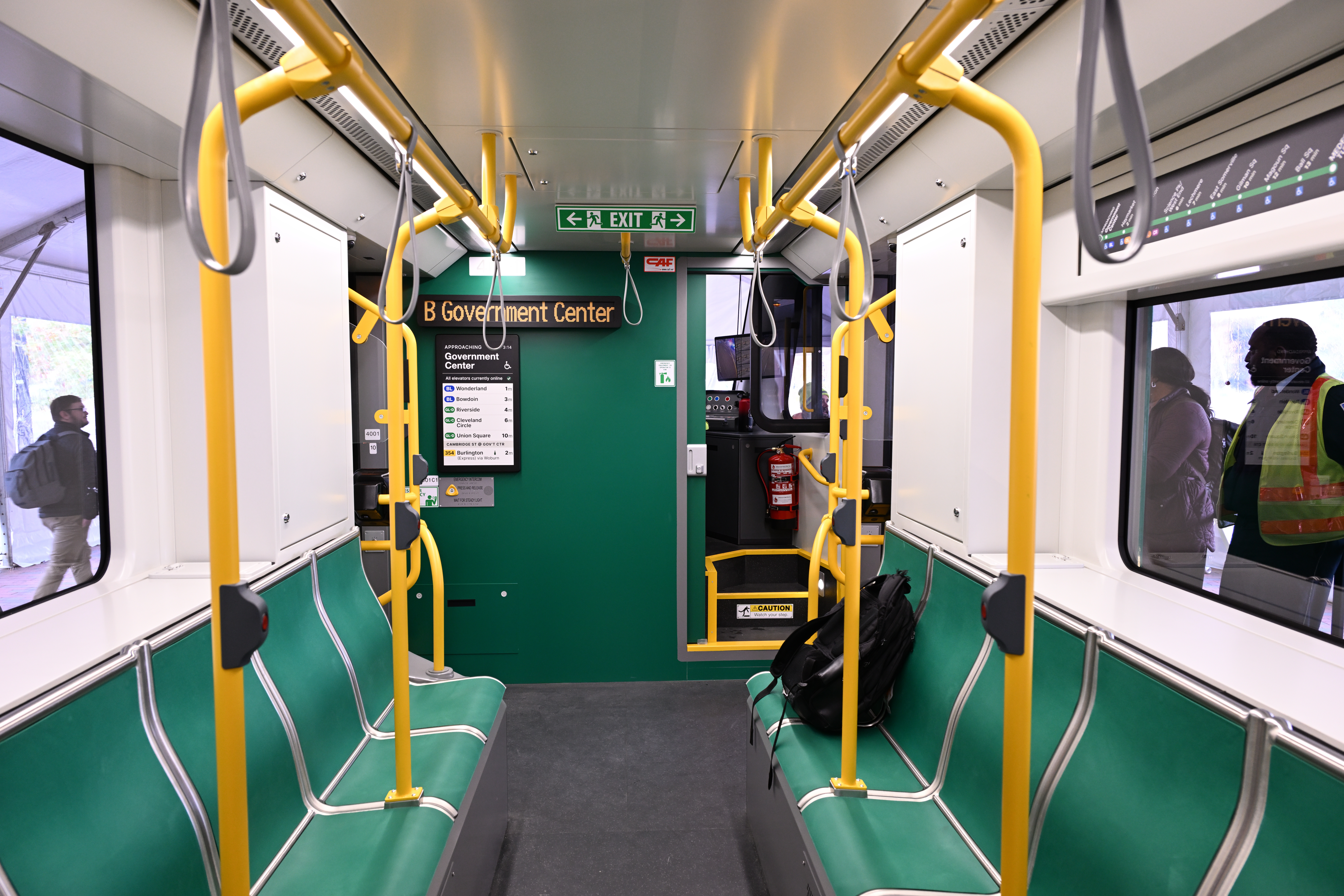
Interior of the Type 10 mockup, showing larger passenger information displays and the operator's enclosed cab

The design of the Type 10 cars is also built around the ongoing project to upgrade the CharlieCard. The upgraded CharlieCard will support proof-of-payment fares, which will allow Green Line operators to stop processing fares. The Type 10 cars incorporate this change into their design, with operators driving the train from an enclosed, full-width cab.

The MBTA followed a best value procurement model for the Type 10 cars, and evaluated proposals from CAF, Siemens Mobility, and Alstom. In August 2022, CAF was selected to build the new cars, at a total cost of $811 million. The purchase price includes 102 cars, 2 simulators for operator training, and a 3-year warranty.

== Features ==
=== Accessibility ===
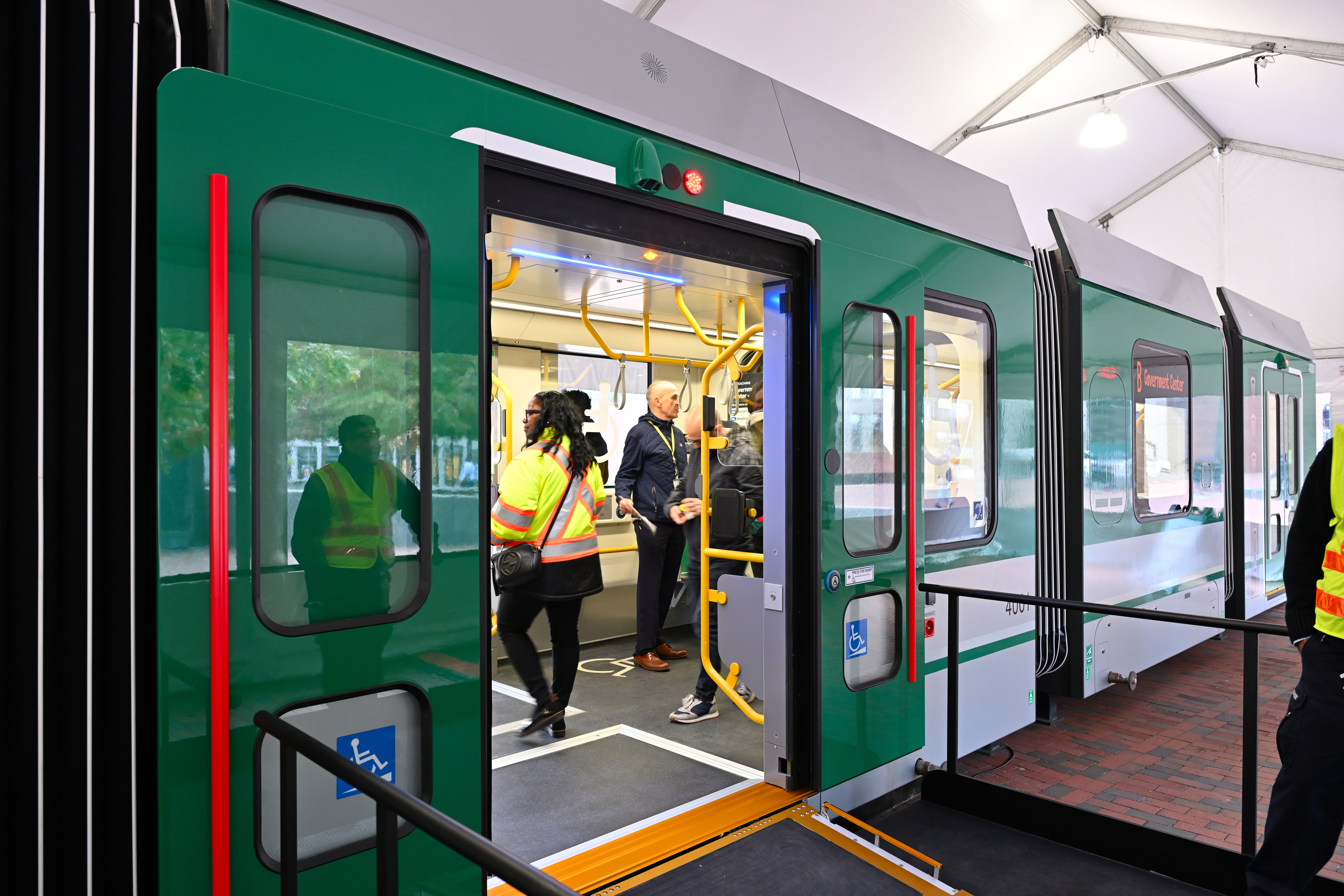
View looking inwards of the Type 10 mockup, showing the reserved wheelchair spaces and bridge plates

The Type 10 is a 100% low-floor design, and 3 of 5 doors on each side will feature a bridge plate for accessible boarding. The cars will feature 4 seating areas for wheelchairs and other wheeled mobility devices. Type 10 cars will also be equipped with audio induction loops, which make audio announcements easier to hear for users of hearing aids.

=== Information systems ===
The Type 10 cars will include enhanced passenger information systems. Screens throughout the cars will display upcoming stops, route information, and service changes.

=== Safety ===
The Type 10 cars will be fitted with positive train control equipment, to be used with the future Green Line Train Protection System. The Green Line Train Protection System program has been delayed substantially after the MBTA fired an underperforming contractor in June 2024, and will enter service well after the previous estimate of 2025.

== Prototypes and construction ==
The Type 10 cars will be built at CAF USA's facility in Elmira, New York. As of April 2026, the first four prototype cars are expected to be delivered in late 2026, with entry into service in early 2027, and all 102 cars to be delivered by 2031. The MBTA held a contest to determine the color scheme for the Type 10 vehicles in 2023, which selected a green and dark gray design with a white and green stripe.

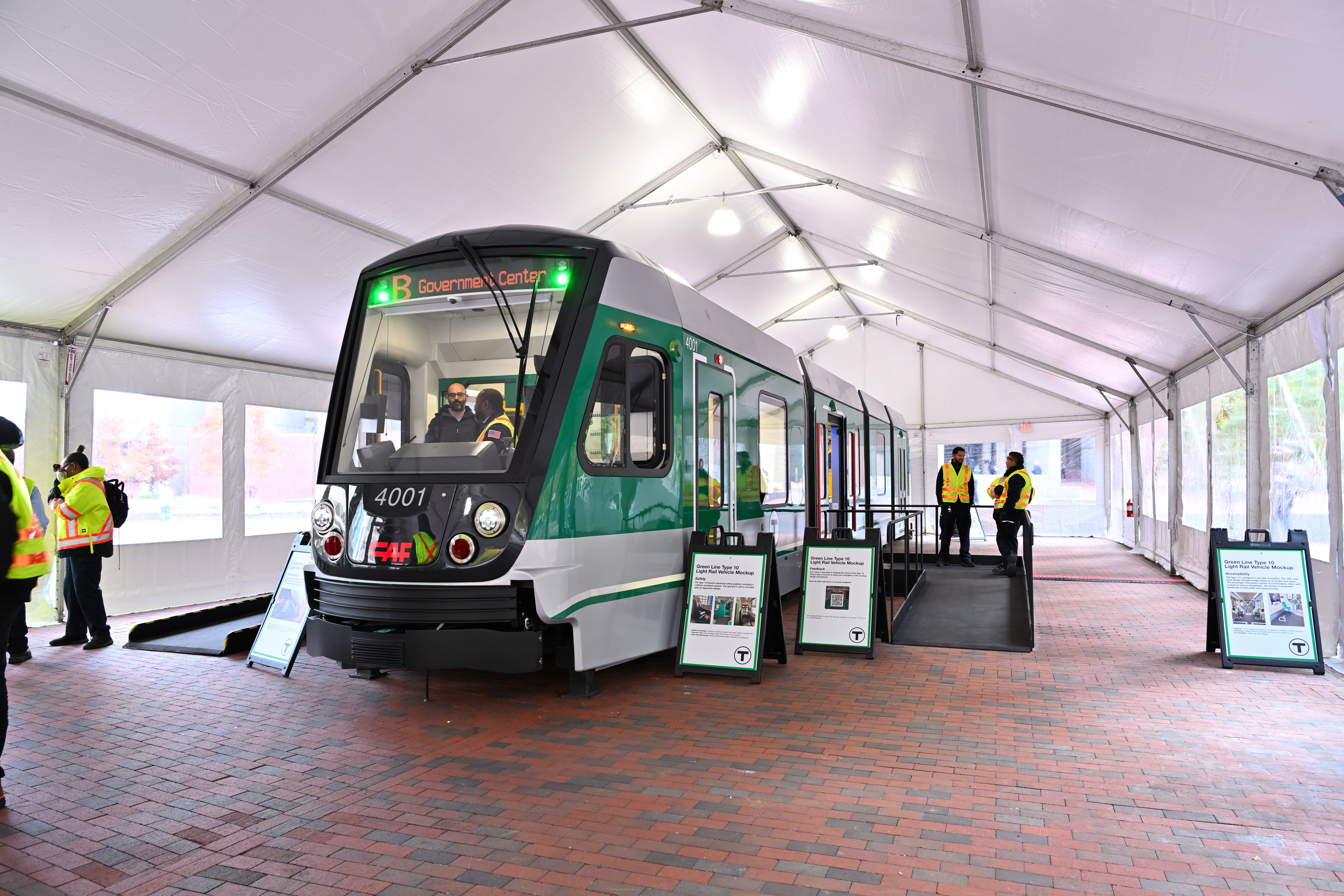
Exterior view of the Type 10 mockup at City Hall Plaza

A full-scale mockup of the Type 10 was displayed in Boston City Hall Plaza on October 29th and 30th, 2024. The full-scale, half-length model includes functioning bridge plates and mockups of passenger information systems, seating, and operator controls.

A slide from the MBTA board of directors meeting on January 22, 2026 noted that all 7 sections of the first pilot car have been assembled.

A video showing a partly-assembled train at CAF's factory was shown by NBC10 Boston on April 8, 2026. In the video, MBTA General Manager Phil Eng noted that feedback from the 2024 mockup was incorporated, with wider aisles and some redesigned seats.

The first pilot car was delivered on September 30, 2026.

== Services ==
The Type 10 cars will be used on all four branches of the Green Line, replacing the Type 7 and Type 8 cars. Initially, Type 10s will operate as single cars, with the option to form two-car trains in the future. Some Type 9 cars will continue in service on the Green Line, and others will be reassigned to the Mattapan Line.

== See also ==
- MBTA CAF USA Type 9
- Green Line Extension
