= Peugeot Type 9 =

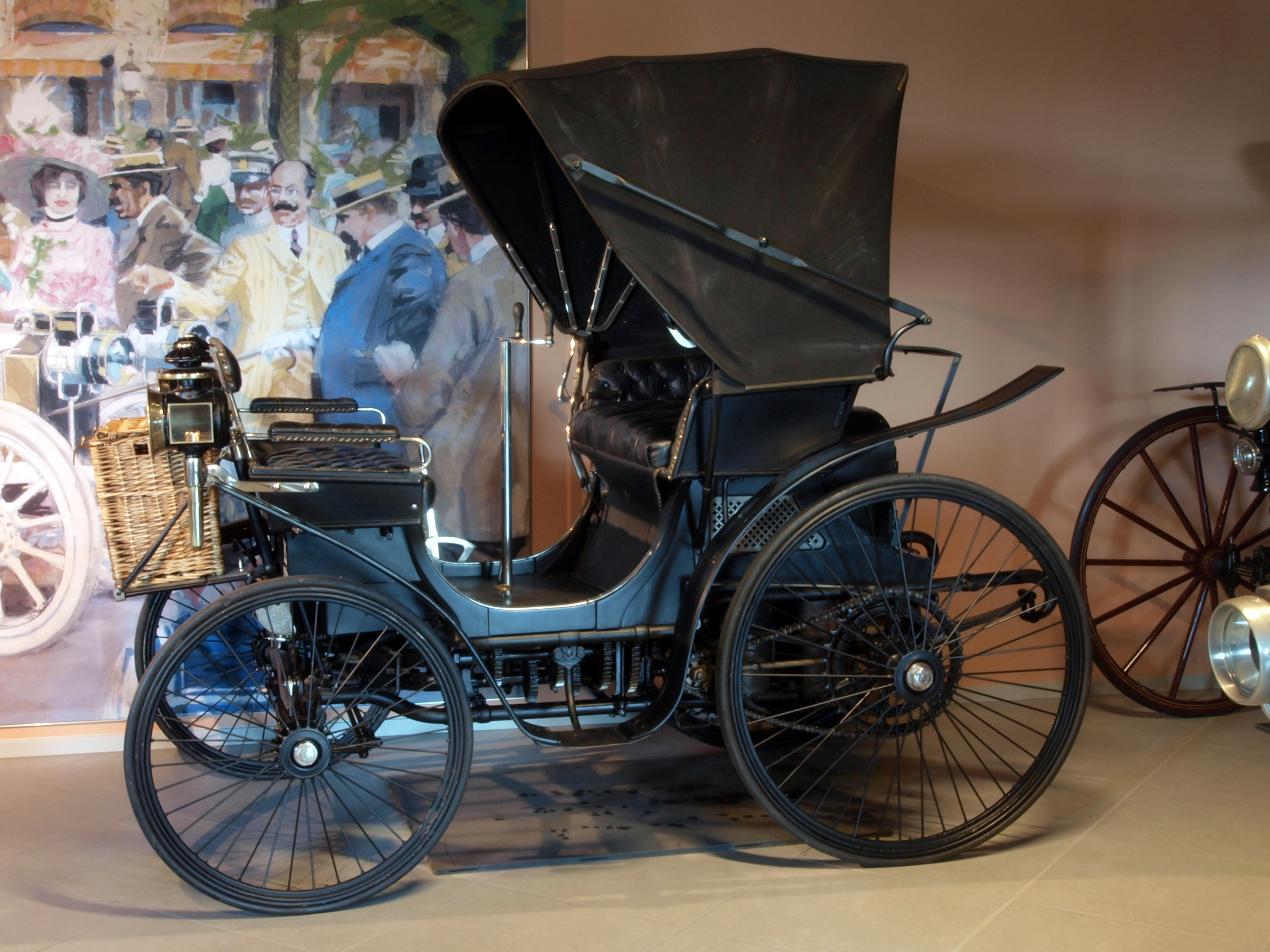

Overview
- Manufacturer: Peugeot
- Production: 1894 – 1897
- Assembly: France
- Designer: Armand Peugeot

Body and chassis
- Class: quadricycle
- Body style: vis-à-vis
- Layout: rear-engine, rear wheel drive
- Related: Peugeot Type 10

Powertrain
- Engine: 1282 cc v-twin
- Power output: 3.75 hp

Dimensions
- Wheelbase: 1650 mm (1.65 m), 65.0 in (5.4 ft)
- Length: 2550 mm (2.55 m), 100.4 in (8.4 ft)
- Width: 1420 mm (1.42 m), 55.9 in (4.7 ft)

Chronology
- Predecessor: Peugeot Type 3
- Successor: Peugeot Type 16

The Peugeot Type 9 was a particular model of early automobile manufactured by the French company Automobiles Peugeot between 1894 and 1897, during which time 87 examples were built. It was equipped with a 1.2 liter v-twin engine made in conjunction with Daimler, one of 257 such vehicles produced. The Type 9 was advertised as the brand's first closed-top family car. Like most European vehicles from this time period, it had very small dimensions and mirrored the design style of horse carriages. A 1894 Type 9 chassis was the first ever vehicle in the world to be equipped with pneumatic tires(by Michelin). It was called L'Éclair and participated in the 1895 Paris-Bordeaux-Paris race.

For 1897, production of the Type 9 along with that of all other Peugeot models was transferred to the company's first dedicated automobile factory in Audincourt.

== See also ==
- Peugeot
- List of Peugeot vehicles
