= MBTA Kinki Sharyo Type 7 =

Light rail vehicle

Kinki Sharyo Type 7
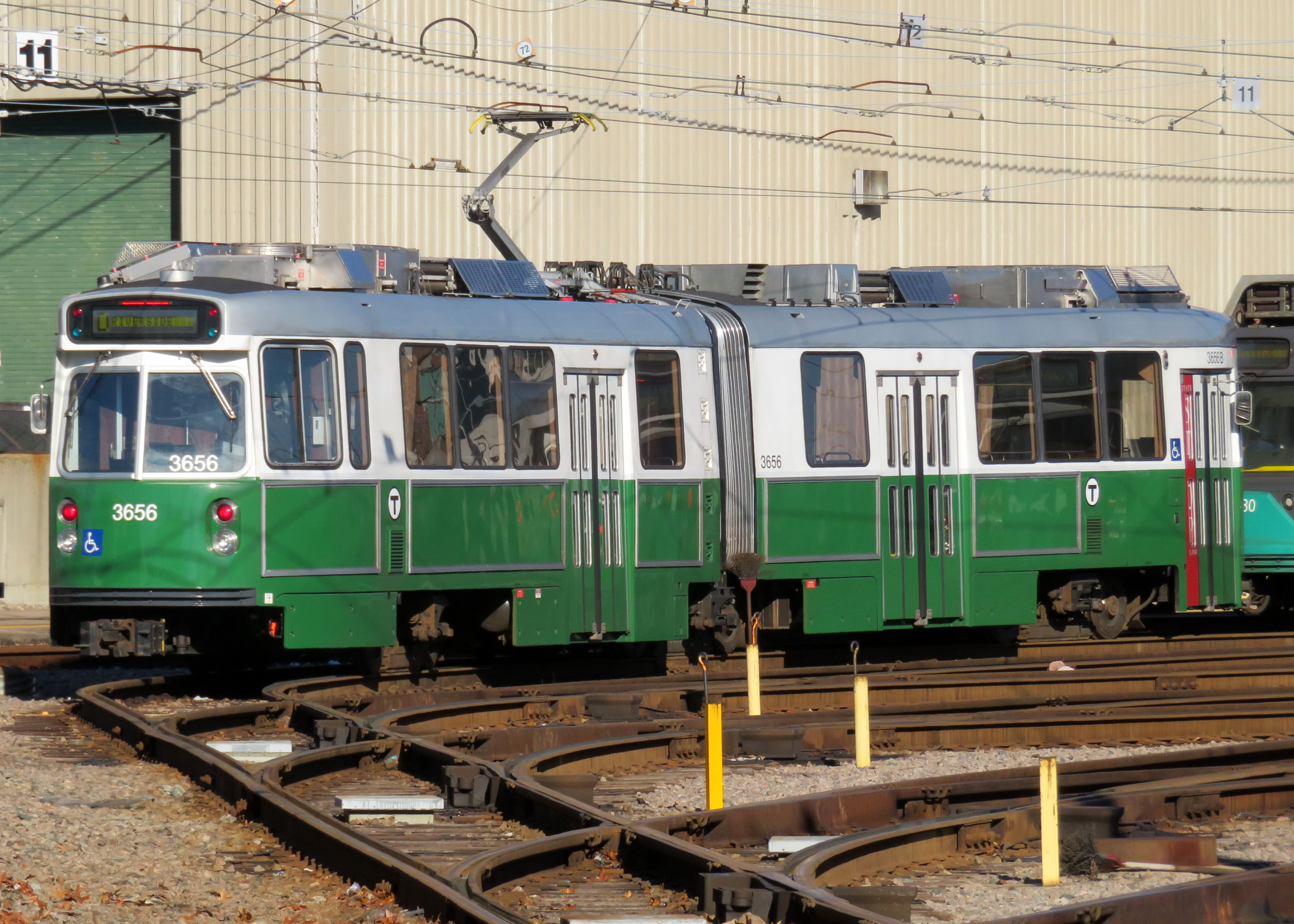
- Refurbished vehicle 3656, in new paint scheme

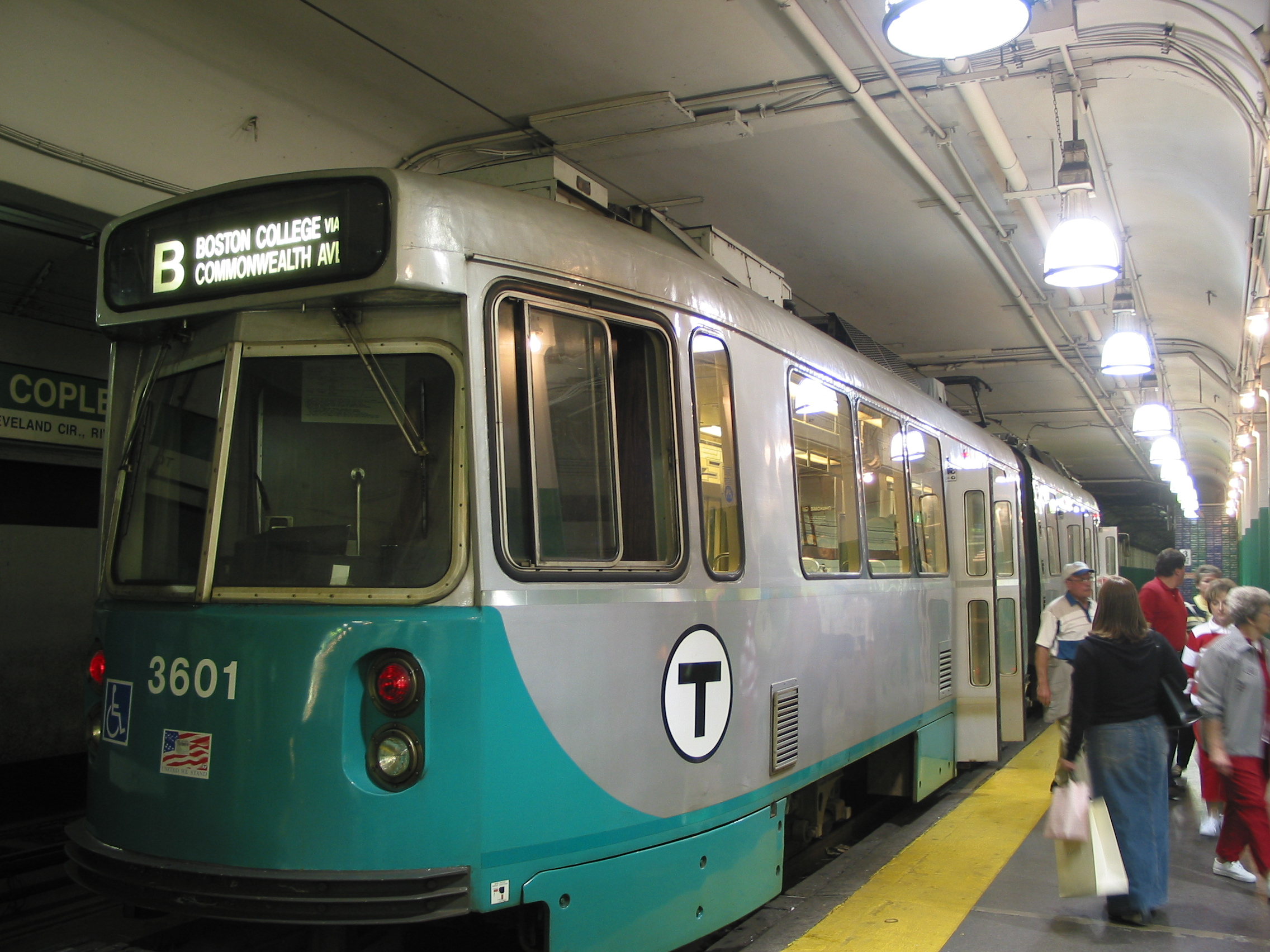
- Car 3601, in old paint scheme
- Stock type: High-floor light rail vehicle
- In service: 1986–present
- Manufacturer: Kinki Sharyo
- Constructed: 1986–1988, 1997
- Entered service: 1986
- Refurbished: 2015–2019
- Number built: 120
- Number in service: 84
- Predecessor: US Standard Light Rail Vehicle
- Fleet numbers: 3600–3719
- Capacity: 147 people (46 seated); maximum 269 people
- Operator: Massachusetts Bay Transportation Authority
- Depots: Riverside Yard; Reservoir Yard; Inner Belt Vehicle Maintenance Facility
- Line served: Green Line

Specifications
- Car length: 74 ft 0 in (22,555 mm)
- Width: 8 ft 8.0 in (2,642 mm)
- Height: 11 ft 10.0 in (3,607 mm)
- Floor height: 35.0 in (889 mm)
- Articulated sections: 2 (one articulation)
- Wheel diameter: 26 in (660 mm)
- Wheelbase: 6 ft 3.0 in (1,905 mm)
- Maximum speed: Design: 55 mph (89 km/h) Service: 40 mph (64 km/h)
- Weight: 85,000 lb (39 t)
- Traction system: Chopper control
- Traction motors: Electrical components by Westinghouse (1986–1988 vehicles) or Adtranz (1997 vehicles)
- Electric systems: Overhead line, 600 V DC
- Current collection: Pantograph
- UIC classification: Bo′(2)′Bo′
- AAR wheel arrangement: B-2-B
- Multiple working: Within type; With AnsaldoBreda Type 8
- Track gauge: 4 ft 8 1/2 in (1,435 mm) standard gauge

MBTA Kinki Sharyo Type 7 is a type of light rail vehicle owned by the Massachusetts Bay Transportation Authority (MBTA). Since 1986, the MBTA has used the Type 7 on its Green Line light rail network. It is the first rail vehicle made for an American transit agency built by Japanese rail vehicle manufacturer Kinki Sharyo.

== Background ==
The Green Line, operated by the MBTA, is a light rail system with an underground section in Boston. To replace the PCC cars that had been used for many years, the US Standard Light Rail Vehicle (USSLRV) manufactured by Boeing Vertol was introduced in 1976. However, problems frequently occurred in various parts such as the door, air conditioning system, and storage battery. As a result, a number of vehicles were withdrawn from service, resulting in the cancellation of 55 of the 175 vehicles originally contracted for, and a lawsuit against the manufacturer.

Therefore, the MBTA decided to use the canceled funds to introduce a new vehicle to replace the USSLRV. The MBTA leased and tested the Canadian Light Rail Vehicle (as used by the Toronto Transit Commission) for three months in 1980, but did not adopt the design after finding them unsuitable.

As a result of public bidding, the order was won in December 1983 by Japan's Kinki Sharyo, which was aiming to enter the American railroad vehicle market. Based on this contract, the introduction of a train called the "Type 7" began in 1986.

== Overview ==
=== Development ===
At the time the order was won in the 1980s, Kinki Sharyo had a track record of exporting streetcars to Cairo and Alexandria in Egypt. However, they were still using old technologies such as electric motors using suspended drive systems, air brakes, and resistance control. Because of this, the vehicle used was not sufficient to meet the conditions presented by the MBTA. Therefore, Kinki Sharyo entered into a partnership with the Swiss company SIG, and the design was based on the articulated electric train manufactured by the company for the light rail in Utrecht, Netherlands.

Because funds from the Urban Mass Transportation Administration (UMTA) were used during the manufacturing process, it was subject to the Buy American Act, and more than 50% of all parts were made by companies in the United States, and the final Assembly was performed in the continental United States.

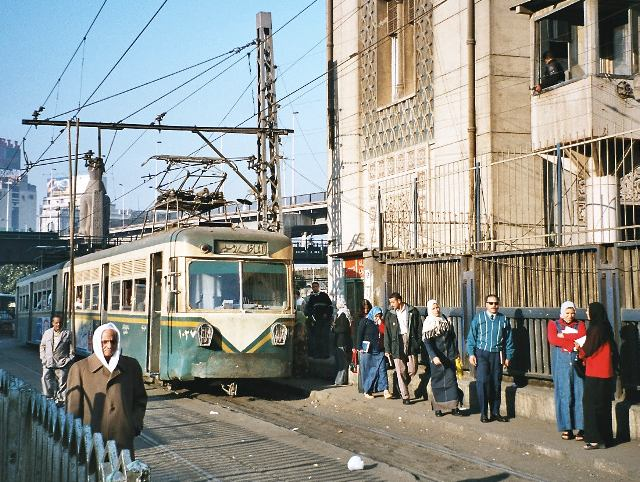
Kinki Sharyo electric train manufactured for Cairo

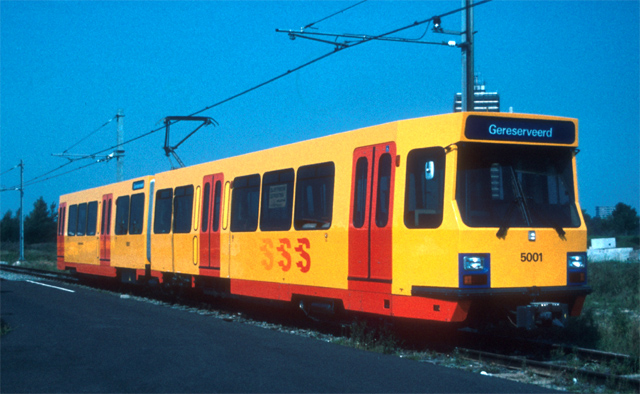
SIG-made train for Utrecht, Netherlands, which was the basis of the Type 7

=== Car body ===
Like the USSLRV, it is a two-body articulated car with both cabs, and the structure is made of weather-resistant high-tensile strength steel that can withstand compressive loads of approximately 65 tons. The back of the exterior panels is coated with soundproofing material to suppress noise throughout the roof, walls, and floor, and on top of that is densely packed glass wool, which has excellent thermal insulation properties. The interior is made lighter by using acrylic resin lining panels.

The audience seats are box seats arranged perpendicular to the direction of travel, and are equipped with cushions on FRP frames. In addition, stainless steel grip bars for standing passengers are installed near the entrance and exit doors, as well as an in-car guidance display that displays the destination and a stop request device that informs the driver when to get off the train. The passenger door consists of four outward folding doors, and two steps are installed inside the vehicle for access to the vehicle, which is 889 mm above the floor height. Therefore, passengers using wheelchairs must board and alight at stations equipped with ramps and wheelchair lifts.

The driving system uses foot pedals similar to those used in automobiles for both acceleration and deceleration, and the structure is such that the required force can be obtained depending on the amount of pedal depression. The equipment in the driver's cab is designed to have a simple layout, and operation is possible by operating the key-type lever switch and operation function switch.

=== Equipment ===
A total of two powered bogies are installed on the cab side of each car body, and one auxiliary bogie is installed on the articulated segment. The trucks are manufactured using a steel plate press-welded structure, with conical roller bearings arranged on the wheelset and a disc brake in the center. The wheels use V-shaped elastic wheels to suppress noise.Air springs are used as pillow springs, and an automatic height adjustment valve allows the floor height to be kept constant. A two-stage reduction gear is used for power transmission, and rubber anti-vibration support is provided. In addition to these, a bolster anchor using cushioning rubber is installed between the bogie frame and the sway pillow, which has the function of suppressing longitudinal vibrations, resulting in improved ride comfort and running performance compared to the USSLRV.

The control system uses an armature chopper control system manufactured by Westinghouse Electric, and is controlled by a computer along with an electric command type brake for regenerative and electric regular use . In addition, the power bogie has two electric motors (output 103 kW) connected in series, each of which is controlled by an independent control device. Two sets of control circuits are installed to ensure redundancy, and the design is such that even if one circuit stops, the other circuit can be used to keep the vehicle running.

To maintain the air conditioning inside the car, an air conditioning unit on the roof (equipped with heating and cooling functions) and a heater under the floor are installed. It is discharged from both sides and after maintaining the temperature inside the car at the set temperature, it is returned to the air conditioning unit through the grille and used again for air conditioning along with the outside air.

== Operation ==
The prototype vehicle was completed in 1985, and starting in October of the same year, running tests were conducted using the test track located at Kinki Sharyo's factory to confirm running performance under load conditions and the braking system. The following year, further testing was done on the MBTA, including maximum speed and radio. After final confirmation tests, commercial operation began in the same year, including mass-produced vehicles that were introduced from May onwards.

The Type 7 was introduced to replace the USSLRV, which was withdrawn from service due to frequent breakdowns, and was well received for its high performance and reliability. An order was placed for 50-second-order cars, and in 1996, an additional 20 third-order cars were introduced with the electrical equipment manufacturer changed to Adtranz. These achievements served as the foundation for Kinki Sharyo to manufacture numerous rolling stock for light rail systems throughout the United States. In addition, as for the paint, the first and second-order cars followed the USSLRV's, with the lower half of the car body being green and the upper half white, while the third-order car was changed to a new paint job using silver metallic and emerald green. This paint scheme was reverted post-refurbishment, back to the white and green color scheme. The differences by year of order, including the Type 7 vehicle number, are listed below.

	Numbers	Year of order	Year of delivery	Electrical equipment manufacturers
First batch	3600–3649	1983	1986	Westinghouse
Second batch	3650–3699	1986	1987–88	Westinghouse
Third batch	3700–3719	1995	1996	Adtranz

In 1999, the partially low-floor Type 8 train manufactured by AnsaldoBreda entered service, with the Type 7 able to run in multiple with Type 8 trains. In response to the Americans with Disabilities Act, Type 7 vehicles, which have a raised floor structure, are now operated in conjunction with Type 8. Until 2016, a three-car train consisting of two Type 7 cars and one Type 8 car was in commercial operation, but due to excessive equipment for the number of passengers and a series of derailment accidents, only two-car trains, one Type 7 and one Type 8, are in service.

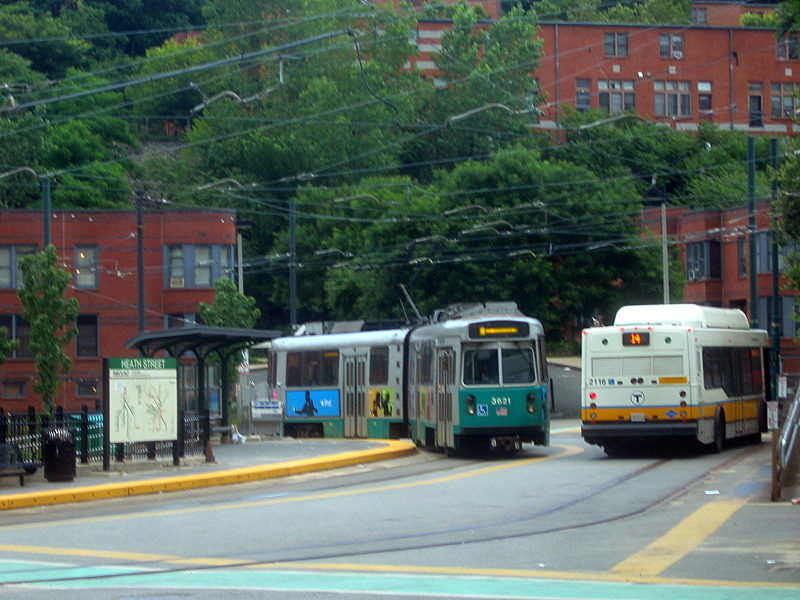
Type 7 street running

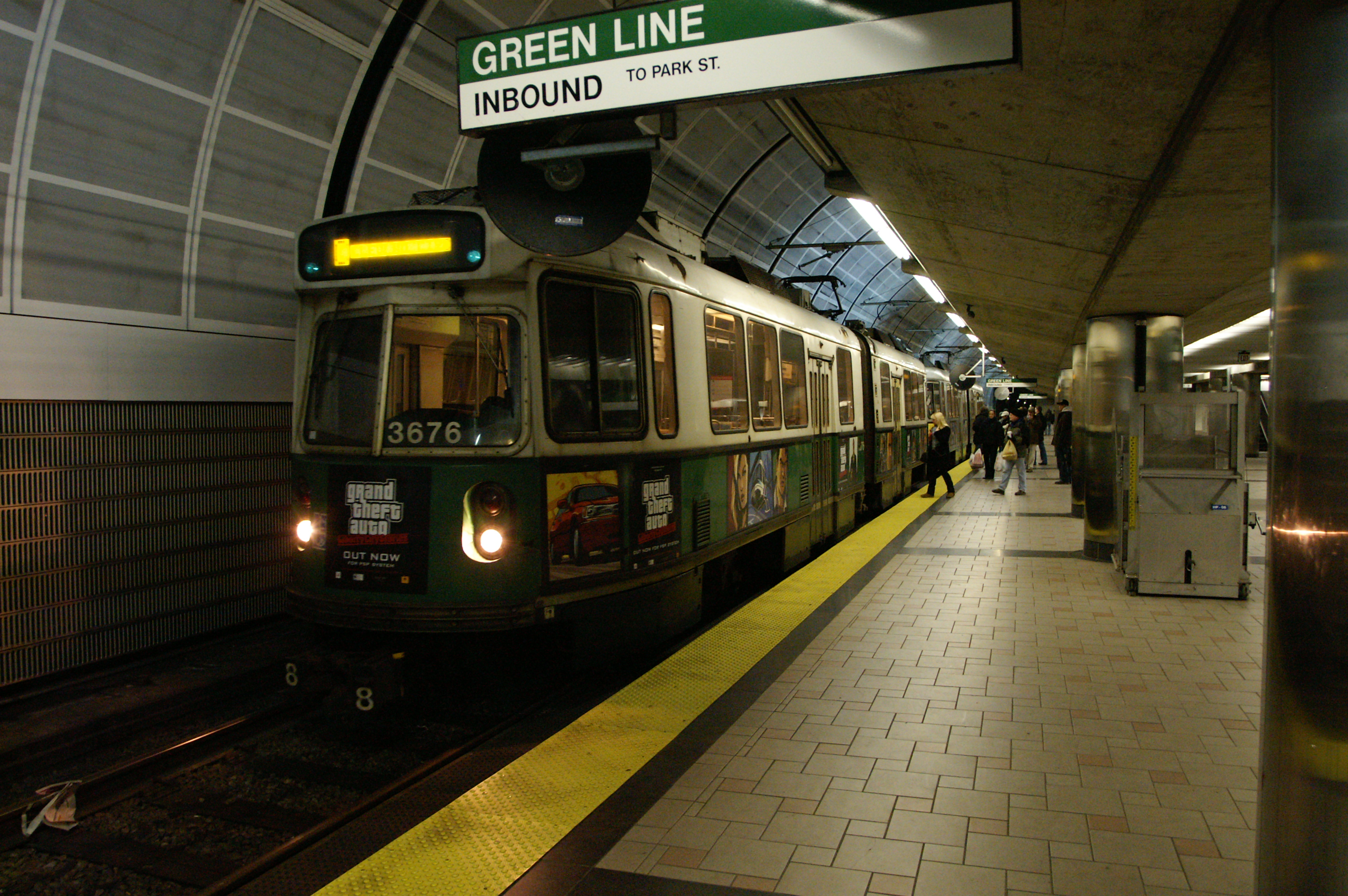
Type 7 seen at North Station

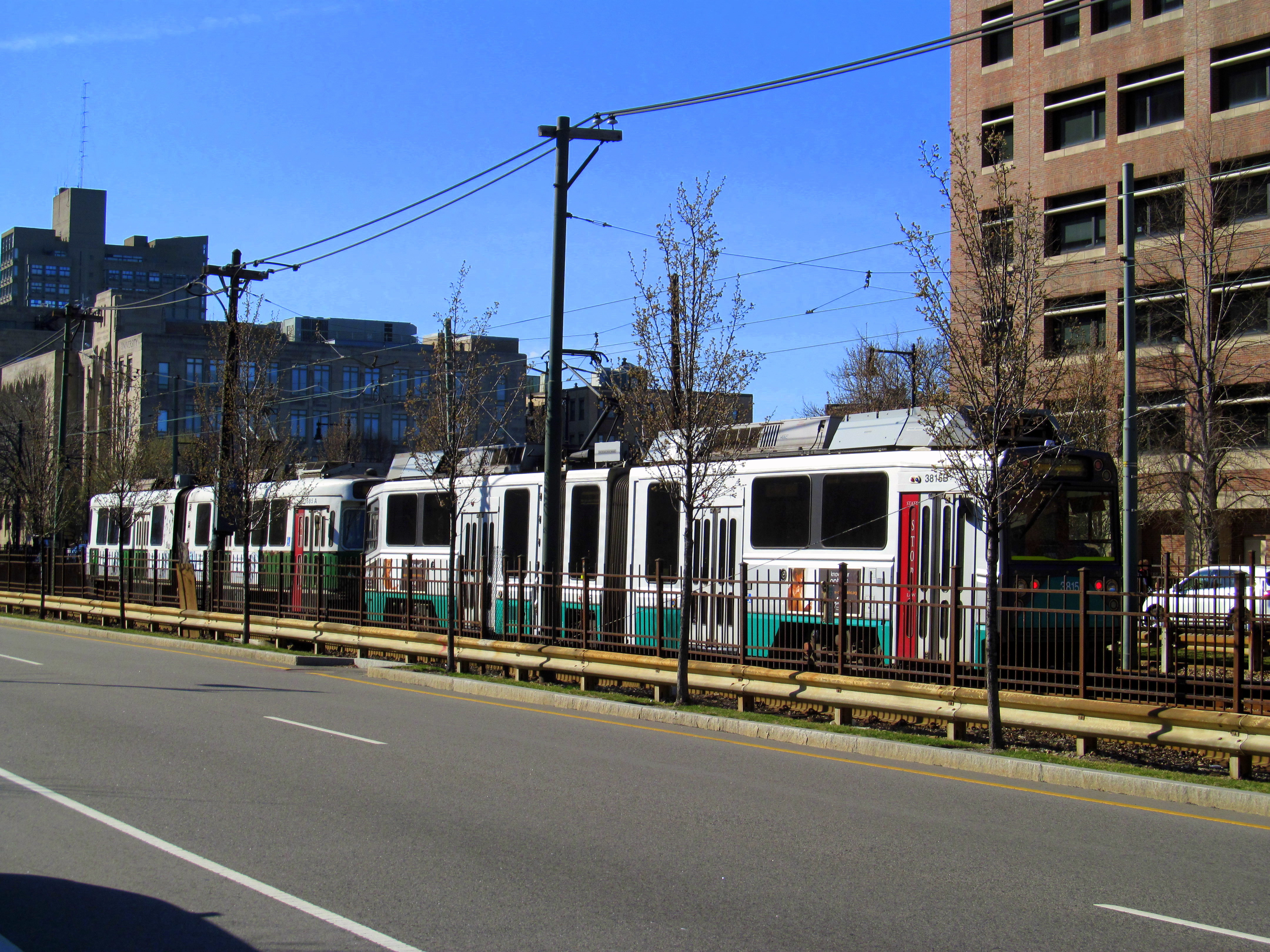
Type 7 (rear) operating with a Type 8 LRV

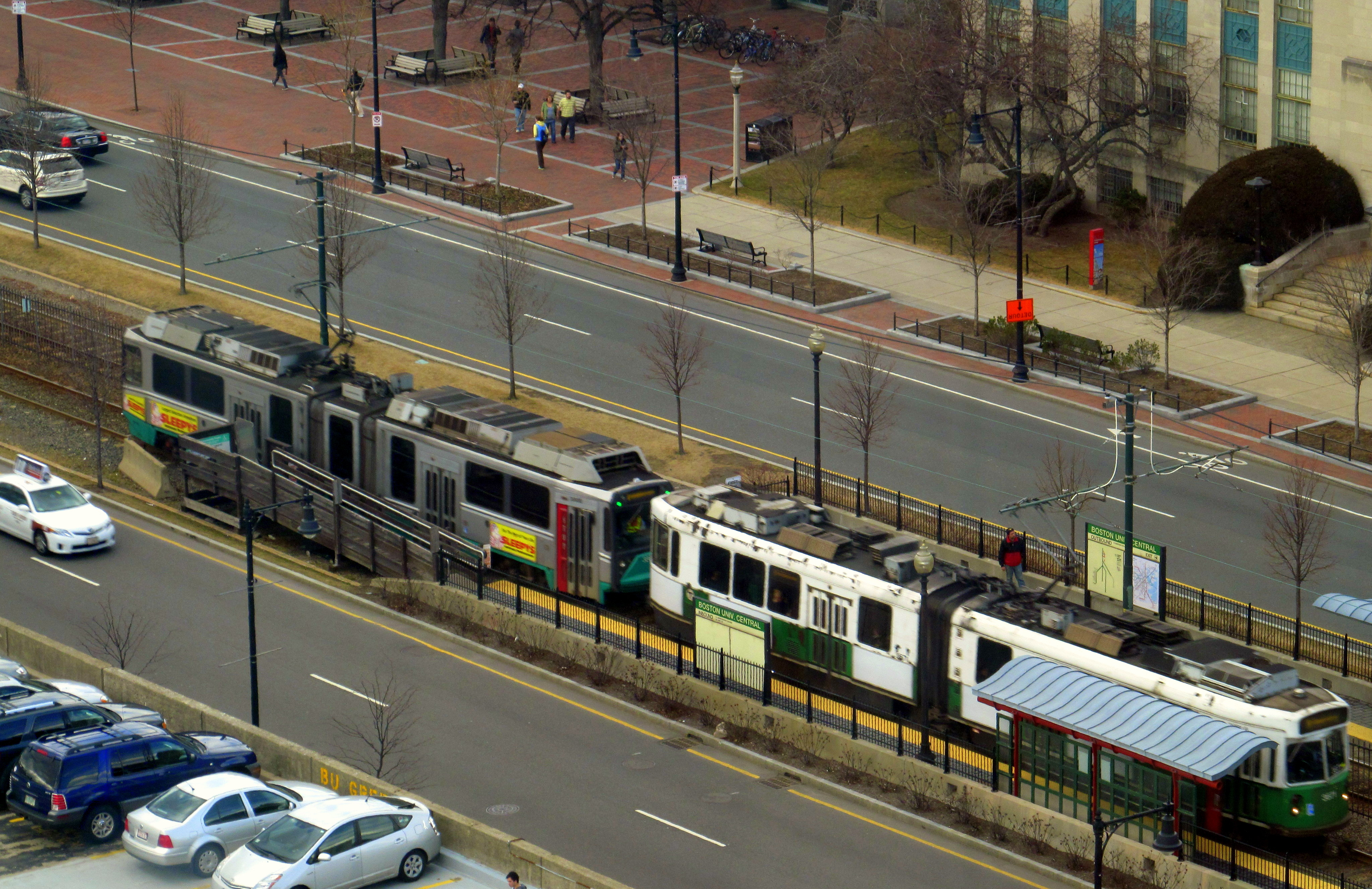
Type 7 on the right, Type 8 on the left

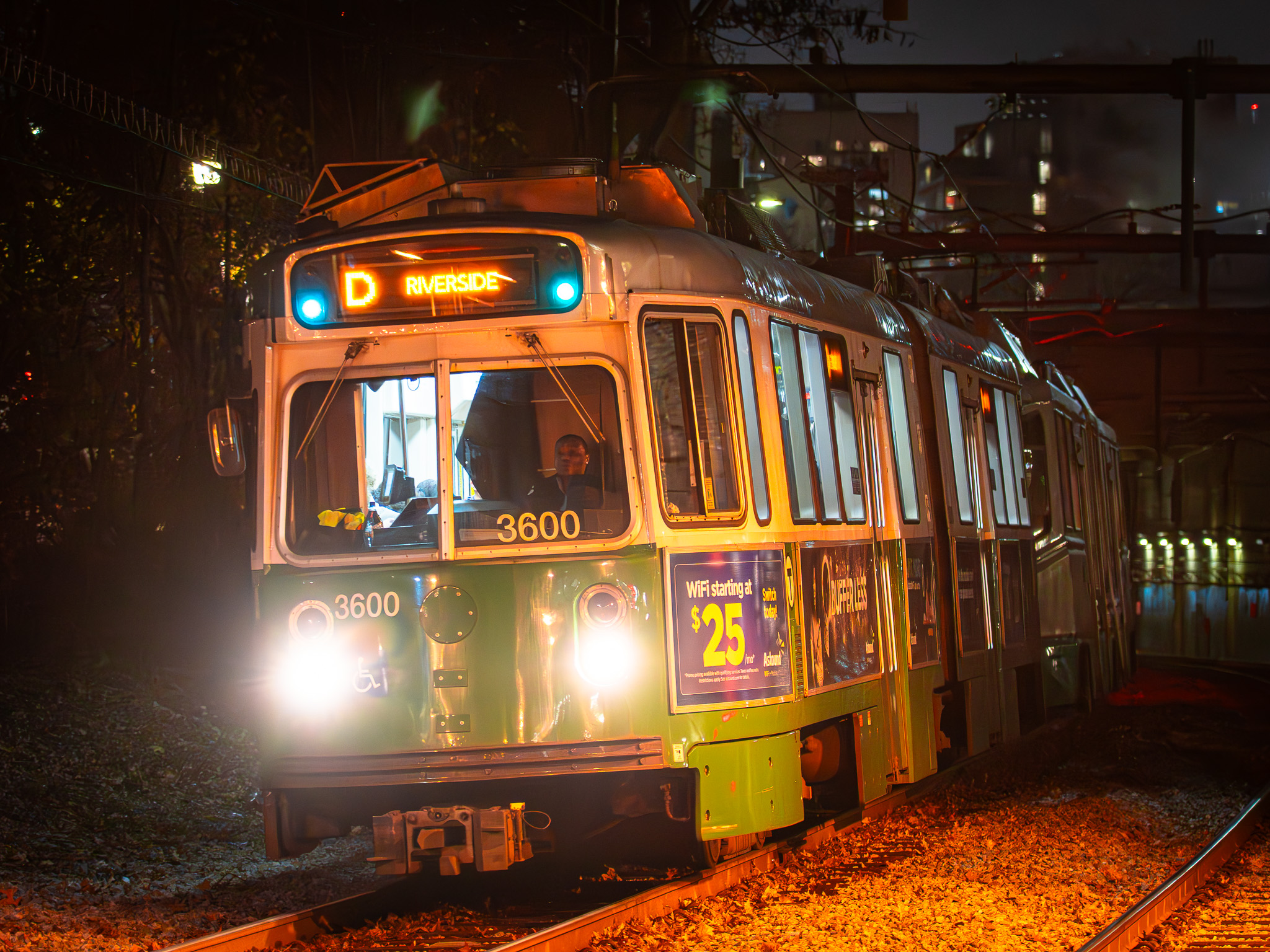
Type 7 seen approaching Brookline Village on the D Branch

In 2012, more than 25 years after the car was first manufactured, a contract was signed with Alstom, which has a factory in New York, to carry out renewal work focusing on the car interior and control equipment. Refurbishment was carried out. However, six vehicles (3665, 3690, 3703, 3711, and 3719) that were out of service due to breakdowns or accidents were not subject to refurbishment and were scrapped.

The Type 7 cars have been noted for poor crashworthiness by the NTSB and Massachusetts Department of Public Utilities (DPU), with several cases of serious structural damage and loss of survivable space (especially to the operator's cab) when hit by another train. After the February 2025 crash where a Type 8 rear ended a Type 7, causing major structural damage to the Type 7 (and comparatively minimal damage to the Type 8), the MBTA was ordered by the DPU to consider corrective measures, such as limiting the maximum allowable speed of Type 7 trains and only using Type 8s as leaders.

== Future ==
From the 2020s onward, all Type 7 and Type 8 trains will be replaced by the Type 10, a fully low-floor light rail vehicle manufactured by Construcciones y Auxiliar de Ferrocarriles (CAF).
