= Class 10 =

Class 10 may refer to:

- A10 class (disambiguation), Queensland steam locomotives
- Baldwin Class 10-12-D, steam locomotives
- Beneteau First Class 10, a French racing sailboat design
- British Rail Class 10, diesel locomotives
- Emu Bay Railway 10 class
- DB Class 10, steam locomotives
- DB Class E 10, electric locomotives
- JNR Class C10, steam locomotives
- JNR Class DE10, diesel locomotives
- JNR Class E10
- JNR Class EF10
- JNR Class EH10
- LNER Class Y10
- LSWR K10 class
- Northern Pacific class S-10
- NSB El 10, electric locomotives
- SCORE Class 10, off-road racing buggies
- Secure Digital (SD) Cards class of speed
- South Maitland Railways 10 Class, steam locomotives
- Southern Pacific class AC-10
- U-10-class submarine

== See also ==
- Type 10 (disambiguation)
- X class (disambiguation)
