= MBTA AnsaldoBreda Type 8 =

Light rail vehicle

AnsaldoBreda Type 8
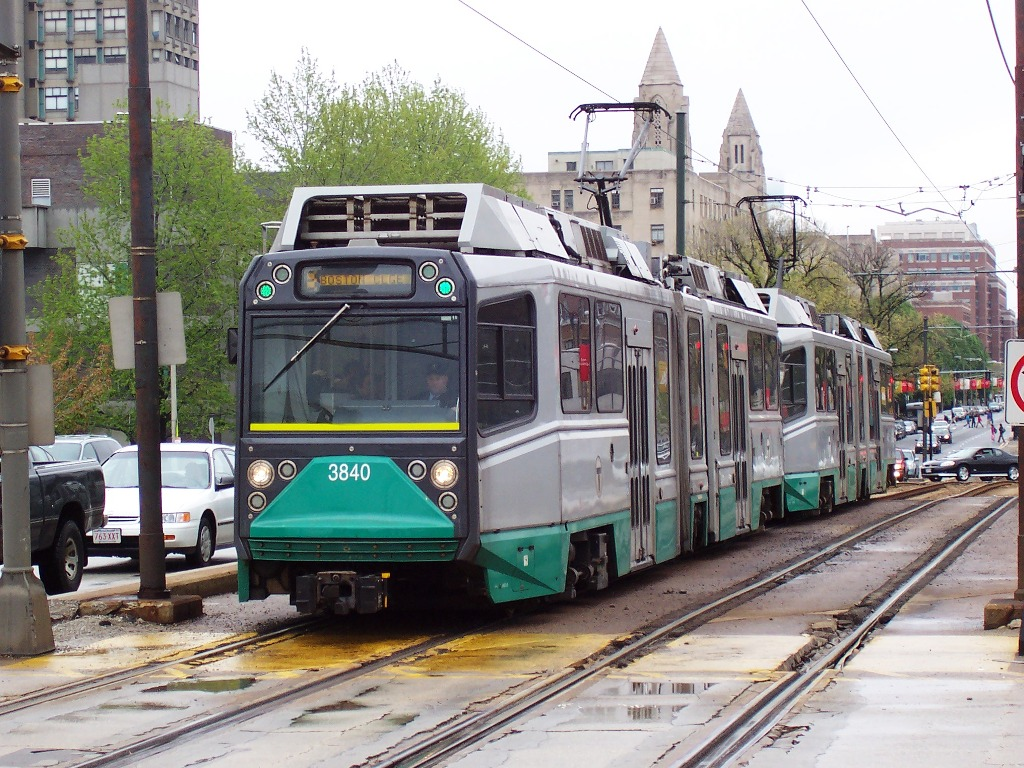
- In service: 1999–present
- Manufacturers: Breda, later AnsaldoBreda
- Replaced: All remaining Boeing LRVs (Boeing Vertol)
- Constructed: 1998–2007
- Entered service: March 1999
- Number built: 95
- Number in service: 76
- Number preserved: 1 (MBTA Training Facility) (3879)
- Fleet numbers: 3800-3894
- Operator: MBTA
- Depots: Riverside Yard; Reservoir Yard; Inner Belt Vehicle Maintenance Facility
- Line served: Green Line

Specifications
- Car length: 74 ft 0 in (22,555 mm)
- Width: 8 ft 8.0 in (2,642 mm)
- Height: 11 ft 9.6 in (3,596 mm)
- Floor height: 14.0 in (355 mm)
- Doors: 6
- Articulated sections: 3 (two articulations)
- Wheel diameter: 28.00 in (711.2 mm)
- Wheelbase: 6 ft 3.0 in (1,905 mm)
- Maximum speed: Design: 55 mph (89 km/h) Service: 40 mph (64 km/h)
- Weight: 86,000 lb (39,000 kg)
- Traction system: Adtranz/Bombardier PWM 2-level IGBT–VVVF
- Traction motors: 4 × Adtranz/Bombardier 1508C 150 hp (111.9 kW) 3-phase AC induction motor
- Electric systems: Overhead line, 600 V DC
- Current collection: Pantograph
- UIC classification: Bo′+2′+Bo′
- AAR wheel arrangement: B-2-B
- Coupling system: Dellner
- Multiple working: Within type; With Kinki Sharyo Type 7
- Track gauge: 4 ft 8 1/2 in (1,435 mm) standard gauge

MBTA AnsaldoBreda Type 8 is a light rail vehicle that was built by Breda (merged into AnsaldoBreda during production) for the Massachusetts Bay Transit Authority (MBTA). The cars were constructed from 1998-2007 and replaced all remaining Boeing LRVs. They were built to have a low-floor section to allow for accessibility by all. As of 2018, most cars are coupled to one Kinki Sharyo Type 7 in regular service to create a two-car train with one accessible car. They run on all branches of the Green Line. The MBTA currently runs 92 out of 95 Type 8 vehicles, numbered 3800 to 3894. They are maintained at the Reservoir and Riverside carhouses.

== History ==
In 1996, the MBTA contracted Breda to make 100 new cars for the Green Line. These cars would be known as the Type 8. In March 1998, car numbers 3800 to 3802 were delivered to the MBTA and began testing on the Riverside branch the following summer. The Type 8 first entered revenue service in March 1999. Between August 2000 and June 2001, trains were removed from service several times due to various mechanical issues. The Type 8 was removed from service in 2002 following a derailment and eventually returned to service on the B branch in May 2003.

The maintenance issues experienced by Type 8 Vehicles delayed the retirement of the Boeing LRVs by several years. According to MBTA Chief Operating Officer Jeff Gonneville, they present a "maintenance challenge".

The vehicles were first used in regular service on the B, C, and E branches. The B, C, and E branches run in street medians or mixed traffic, generally operating at low speeds, while most problems with the Type 8 were experienced at high speeds. The D branch, a fully grade-separated right-of-way, allows trains to reach higher speeds of 40 to 50 mph. At the time that the Type 8 was introduced, the D branch had poor track conditions. The Type 8 was unable to operate on the D branch until the tracks were fully rehabilitated in the summer of 2007. Type 8 cars have been in service on all four branches of the Green Line since December 1, 2008.

In May 2008, the A end of car number 3879 was severely damaged after a derailment. Car 3879 was stored out of service at the Riverside yard until January 2013, when it was repaired and permanently moved to the MBTA training facility at Broadway, where it is in use training employees and first responders.

In October 2016, the Boston Globe reported that the MBTA Green Line had the most derailments in the nation due to the Type 8.

As of December 2019, car numbers 3847 and 3854 were withdrawn and are now stored as parts sources. The remaining vehicles are expected to be replaced by the CAF Type 10 LRV.

== Features ==
Features include automated announcements, next stop signs, 75% low floor accessibility for wheelchairs, and white interior walls. The automated announcements and next stop signs were also retrofitted onto the Kinki Sharyo Type 7s. Like the rest of the MBTA system, the original pre-recorded announcements were made by the voice of Frank Oglesby, Jr. These cars use similar traction motors to those used in the New York City Subway's R142A, R188 and R143 trains, as well as the original fleet (CQ31x) of the MARTA rail network in Atlanta.
