= Colt Police Positive =

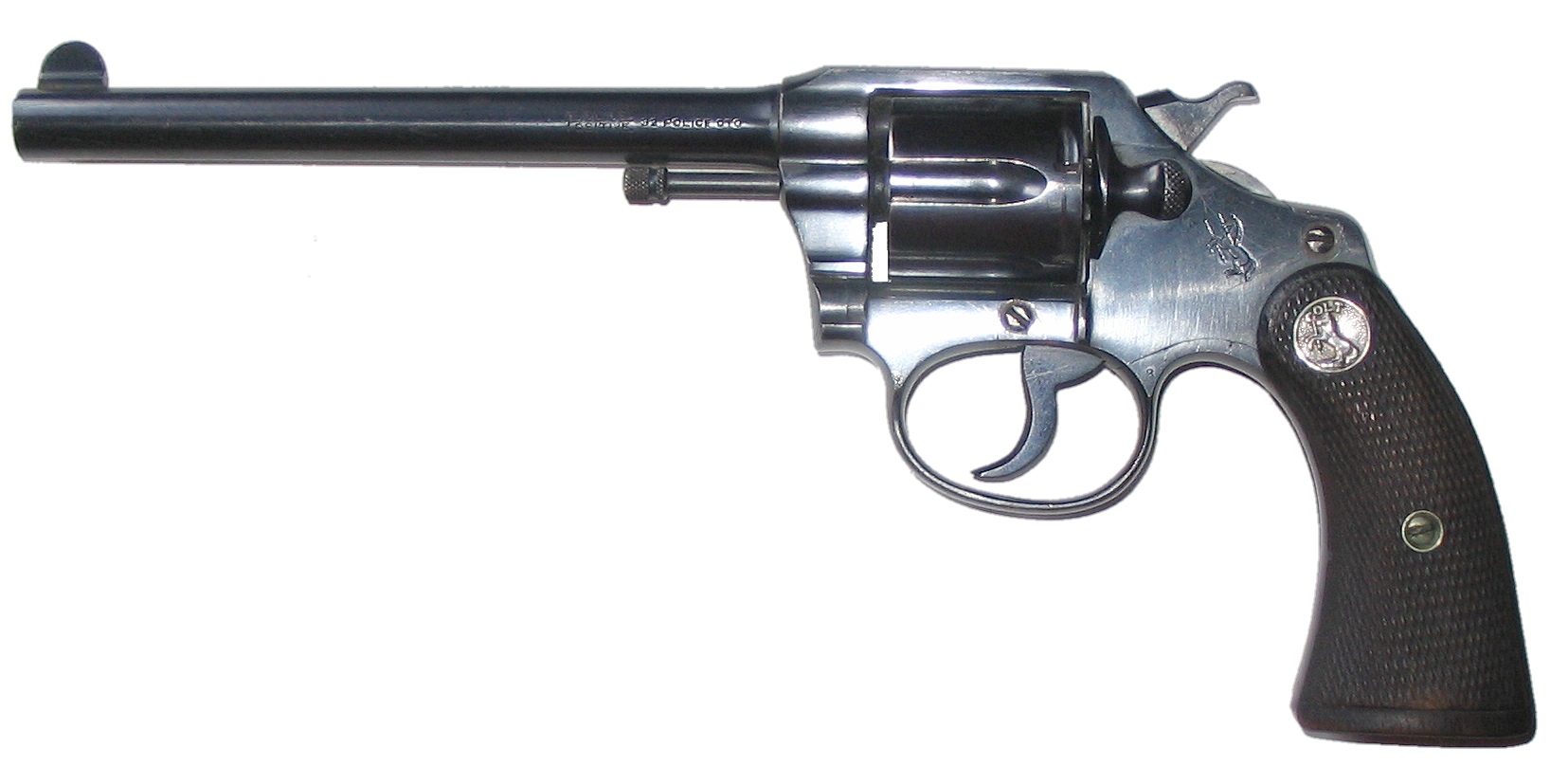
- Blued Colt Police Positive revolver; six inch barrel
- Type: Revolver
- Place of origin: United States

Service history
- Wars: Constitutionalist Revolution

Production history
- Manufacturer: Colt's Manufacturing Company
- Produced: 1907–1947
- Variants: See Variants

Specifications
- Barrel length: 2.5 in (63.5 mm); 4 in (102 mm); 5 in (125 mm); 6 in (153 mm)
- Cartridge: .22 LR; .22 WRF; .32 Long/Short Colt; .32 Colt New Police (.32 S&W Long); .38 Colt New Police (.38 S&W); .32-20 Winchester ("Special" variant); .38 Special ("Special" variant)
- Action: Double-action revolver
- Feed system: Six round cylinder
- Sights: Fixed iron; half-moon blade front, V-notch rear

The Colt Police Positive is a small-frame, double-action revolver featuring a six-round cylinder, chambered for either .32 or .38 caliber. A .22 caliber model was also offered. Designed primarily for sale to federal, state, or local law enforcement agencies, the Police Positive was introduced into the firearms market by Colt's Manufacturing Company in 1905.

== Development and history ==
The Colt Police Positive was an improvement of Colt's earlier "New Police" revolver, upgraded with an internal hammer block safety. Colt named this new security device the "Positive Lock", and its nomenclature ended up being incorporated as a partial namesake for the new revolver. The cylinder of the Police Positive rotated in the clockwise direction, the opposite of firearms maker Smith & Wesson's competing models. Ever a canny competitor in the firearms industry, Colt missed no opportunity to score points over its arch rival, and began a marketing campaign which accentuated this detail. In its advertising Colt proclaimed that "All Colt cylinders TURN TO THE RIGHT", and suggested that the Colt design forced the cylinder crane up against the frame, resulting in tighter lockup with less play and better chamber to barrel alignment, thus markedly increasing accuracy. The Police Positive was very successful; along with the Colt Official Police it dominated the law enforcement firearms market in the early 1900s. The Positive was itself incrementally modified in 1908, forming the basis for Colt's Police Positive Special model.

John Schrank used a Police Positive in his attempted assassination of former president Theodore Roosevelt, who was campaigning on a third-party ticket.

In the book "Casino Royale", James Bond keeps a .38-caliber Police Positive with a sawn off barrel under his pillow.

A nickel Police Positive with pearl grips and .32 calibre was used by Charles Bronson as Paul Kersey in Death Wish. American gangster Al Capone also used a Police Positive, a nickel .38 Police Positive with walnut grips and a 4-inch barrel, manufactured in 1929; in June 2011 a private collector sold it at Christie's for the sum of £67,250/$109,080/€75,656.

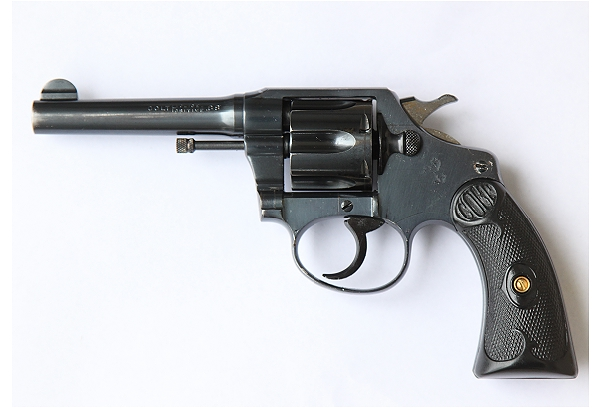
Colt Police Positive in .38 S&W. Made in 1925

== Features ==
The Police Positive was made of carbon steel, and was finished with either a polished blued finish or nickel-plated.

The First issue of the Police Positive ran from the revolver's introduction in 1907 until 1927. Sporting Colt's standard hard rubber grips, it was offered with barrel lengths of 2.5 (available only in .32 caliber), 4, 5, and 6 inches, and was chambered for the .32 Long Colt (it would also accept the .32 Short Colt), .32 Colt New Police, and .38 Colt New Police cartridges. Checkered Walnut grips became standard after 1923.

The Second issue began in 1928 and ran until 1947, adding a somewhat heavier frame as well as a serrated topstrap to reduce sight glare, while retaining the wooden grips. Both of Colt's “New Police” rounds were actually slight redesigns of existing S&W cartridges, the .32 S&W Long and .38 S&W with the bullet noses flattened, as Colt resisted providing its main competitor with any free advertising.

Colt's Positive Lock safety, the innovation responsible for the gun's introduction, functioned by preventing the firing pin from striking the primer of the cartridge unless the trigger was deliberately pulled. Intended to address deficiencies of earlier models such as the Single Action Army, the Positive Lock prevented an accidental discharge even if the hammer was struck or the pistol was dropped, allowing the revolver to be safely carried with all six chambers loaded. The revolver's sights consisted of a half-moon blade front with a fixed iron open rear sight, which was a simple V-notch shaped groove milled into the revolver's topstrap.

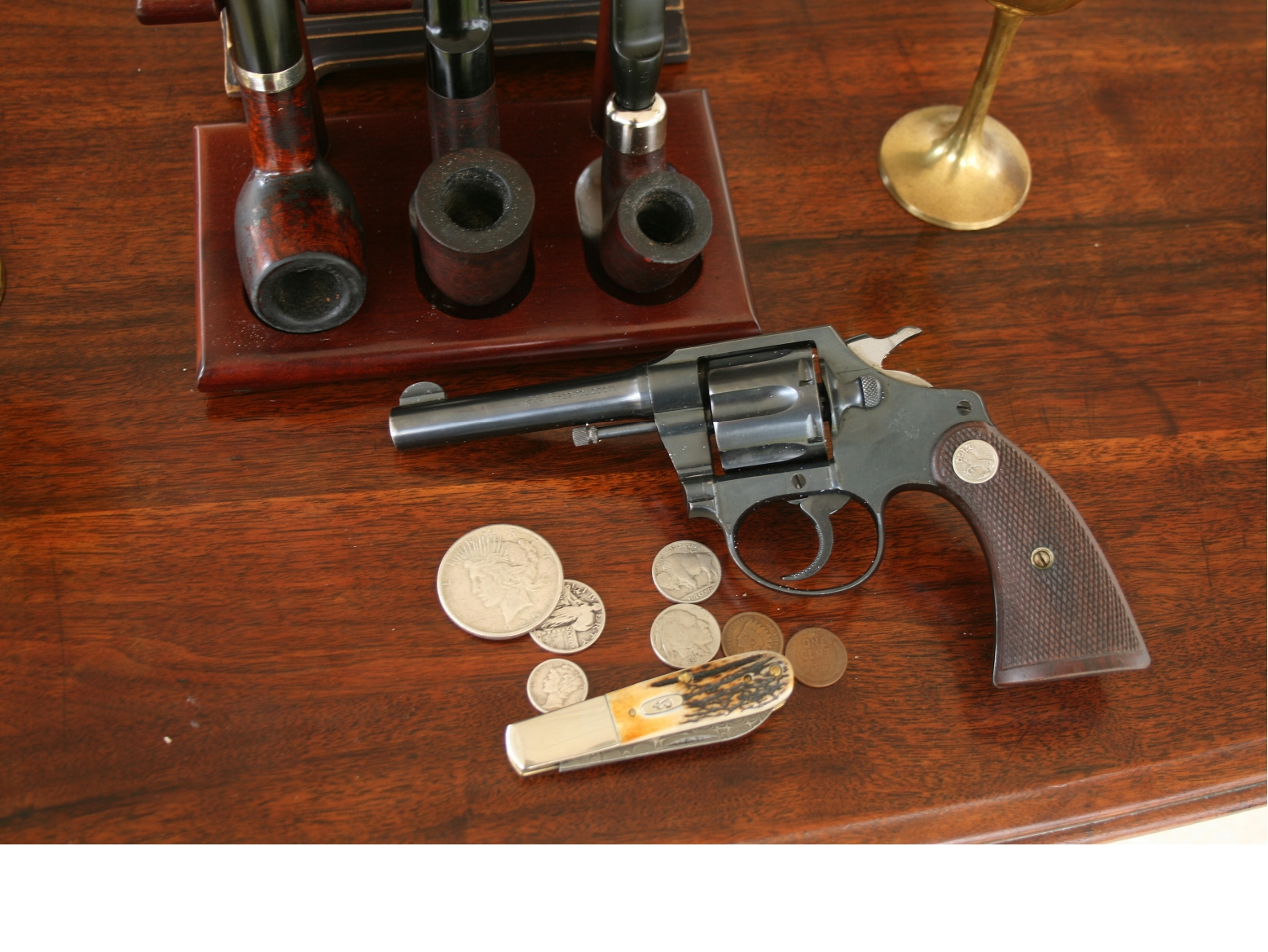
Colt Police Positive caliber .32 S&W Long/.32 Colt New Police made in 1938.

Colt Police Positive revolvers marked with Colt D.A..32 on the barrel are chambered for .32 Long Colt. Revolvers marked with .32 Colt New Police on the barrel are chambered for .32 Smith & Wesson Long.

== Variants ==
=== Police Positive Target ===
Weighing 22 ounces and available with a blued finish and black hard rubber grips in .22 Long Rifle, .22 WRF, .32 Long (and Short) Colt, and .32 Colt New Police (.32 S&W Long) chamberings, the First issue of this model featured an adjustable open iron sighted 6 inch barrel and was marketed from 1910 to 1925, with checked Walnut grips replacing the rubber ones after 1923. A Second issue was sold from 1926 to 1941 and differed from the First in that it had a slightly heftier frame which upped the weight to 26 ounces; also Colt's nickel finish was offered as an option. In today's collectable market, the .32 New Police version appears to be the most sought after and valuable.

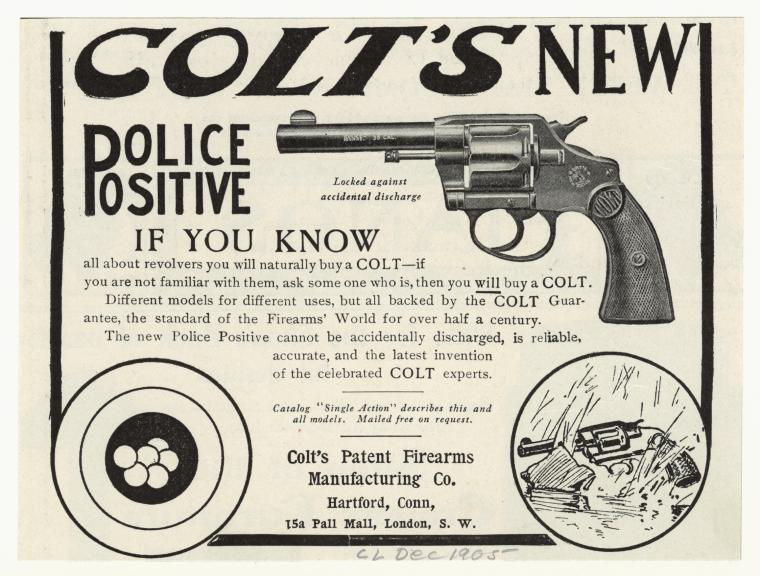
1905 advertisement for Colt's new Police Positive.

=== Police Positive Special ===
The Colt Police Positive Special was an iterative improvement of Colt's earlier Police Positive model, the only differences being a slightly lengthened cylinder and elongated and strengthened frame to allow the chambering of the longer, more powerful .32-20 Winchester and .38 Special cartridges.

=== Bankers' Special ===
This is the Police Positive with a 2-inch barrel chambered in .22 Long Rifle or .38 Colt New Police (.38 S&W). Produced from 1926 to 1940.

=== Detective Special Series ===
The Colt Detective Special and its variants are shortened, somewhat streamlined variants of the Police Positive Special, introduced in 1927.

== Users ==
- Hong Kong: Former standard issue sidearm (1920s? - 1960s?) of Hong Kong Police Force, supplemented by the .38 S&W .38 Webley Mk III Revolver in the 1930s and gradually replaced by the .38 Special Smith & Wesson Model 10.
