= .38 S&W =

Revolver cartridge

.38 Smith & Wesson
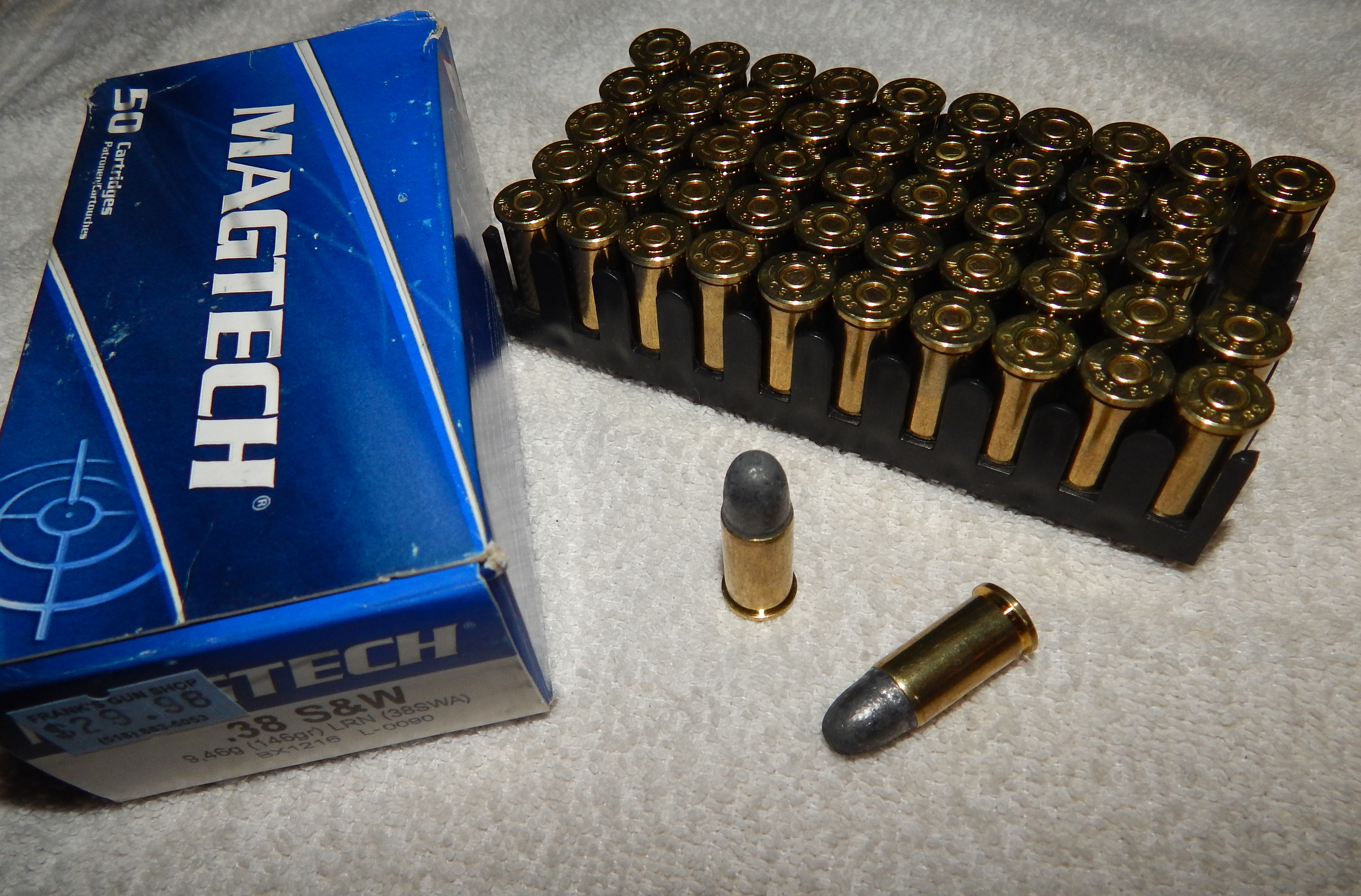
- A box of modern .38 S&W rounds
- Type: Revolver
- Place of origin: United States

Service history
- In service: 1922–1963
- Used by: United Kingdom
- Wars: World War II; Korean War

Production history
- Designer: Smith & Wesson
- Designed: 1877
- Manufacturer: Smith & Wesson
- Produced: 1877–present
- Variants: .38/200, .380 Rim, .38 Colt New Police, .38 S&W Super Police, MKE 9.65 mm Normal

Specifications
- Case type: Rimmed straight
- Bullet diameter: .361 in (9.2 mm)
- Land diameter: .350 in (8.9 mm)
- Neck diameter: .3855 in (9.79 mm)
- Base diameter: .3865 in (9.82 mm)
- Rim diameter: .440 in (11.2 mm)
- Rim thickness: .055 in (1.4 mm)
- Case length: .775 in (19.7 mm)
- Overall length: 1.240 in (31.5 mm)
- Primer type: Small pistol
- Maximum pressure: 14,500 psi (100 MPa)

Ballistic performance
Bullet mass/type	Velocity	Energy
158 gr (10 g) LSWC	767 ft/s (234 m/s)	206 ft⋅lbf (279 J)
195 gr (13 g) LRN	653 ft/s (199 m/s)	185 ft⋅lbf (251 J)
200 gr (13 g) LRN	620 ft/s (190 m/s)	176 ft⋅lbf (239 J)

The .38 S&W, also commonly known as .38 S&W Short (referred to as such to differentiate it from .38 Long Colt and .38 Special), 9×20mmR, .38 Colt NP (New Police), or .38/200, is a rimmed, centerfire revolver cartridge developed by Smith & Wesson in 1877. Versions of the cartridge were the standard revolver cartridges of the British military from 1922 to 1963, in Webley, Enfield, and Smith & Wesson revolvers. Though similar in name, it is not interchangeable with the later .38 Special due to a different case shape and slightly larger bullet diameter.

== History ==
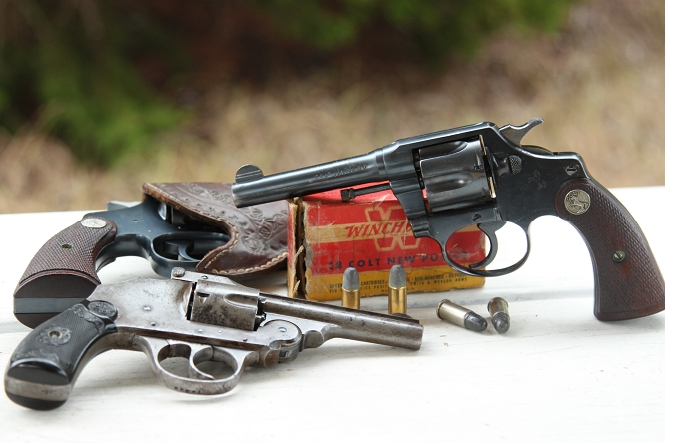
Revolvers chambered for .38 S&W (Colt New Police). Colt Police Positives L&R- Iver Johnson Hammerless Safety Front.

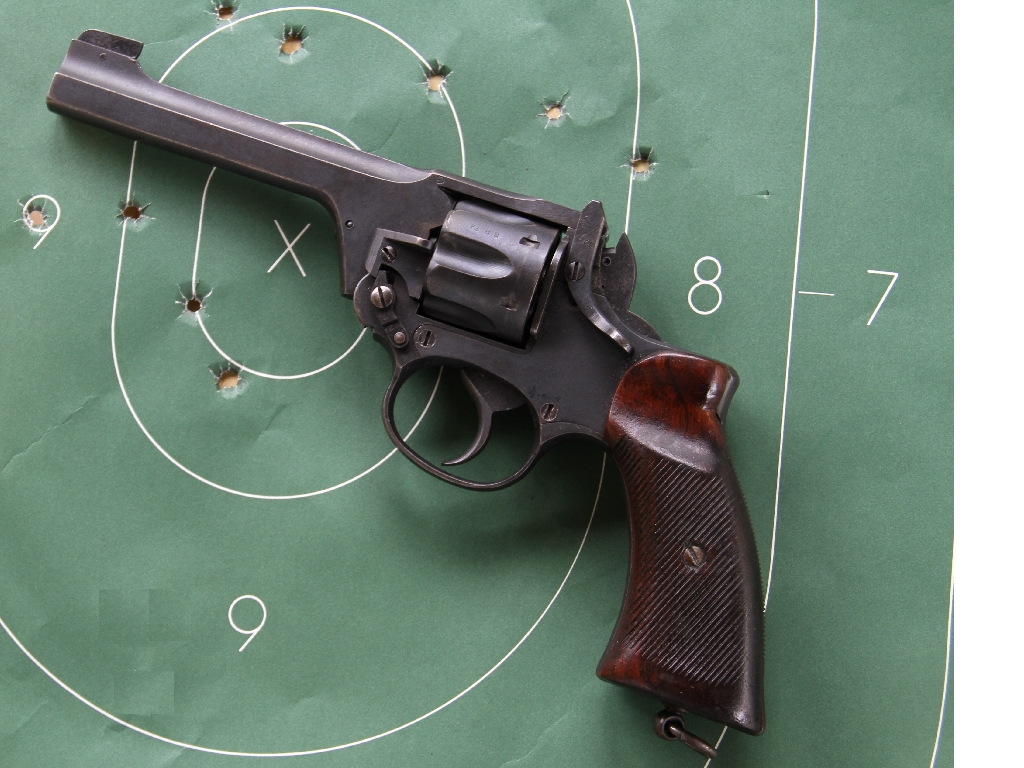
British Enfield No.2 Mk I* DA-only service revolver in .38/200

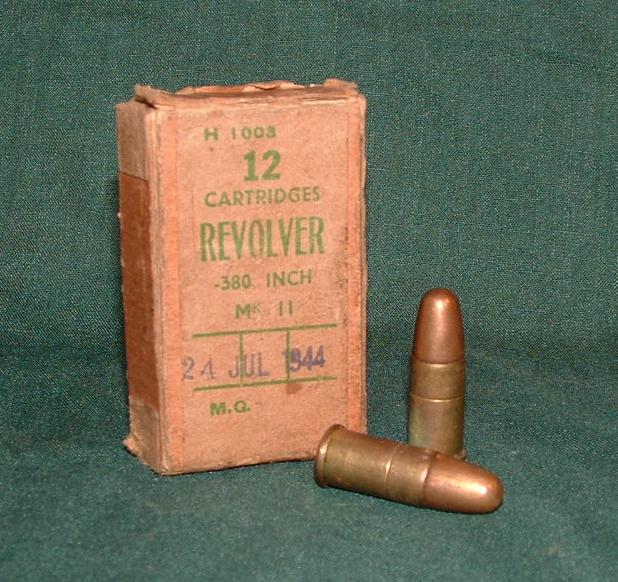
A box of WWII-dated .380" Revolver Mk IIz cartridges (and separate cartridges)

The round was first introduced in 1877 for use in the S&W .38 Single Action. As standard for the era, it featured heeled bullet with the same diameter of bullet and case neck equal to .38 inch; later versions discarded the feature and downsized the bullet, but the designation did not change.

After World War I, the British military sought to replace pre-war revolvers with easier-to-handle weapons. Webley demonstrated a lighter version of their Mk III revolver with modified .38 S&W ammunition, firing a heavy 200-grain (13 g) bullet. It received favorable reports, and the revolver was accepted in principle.

As Webley had used the .38 S&W cartridge dimensions for their revolver, and the cartridge length was fixed by the size of the cylinder of the revolver (the same as for the wider .455), Kynoch produced a cartridge with the same dimensions as the .38 S&W but with 2.8 grains (0.18 g) of "Neonite" nitrocellulose powder and a 200 grain (13.0 g) bullet. In tests performed on cadavers and live animals, it was found that the lead bullet, being overly long and heavy for its calibre, become unstable after penetrating the target, somewhat increasing target effect. The relatively low velocity allowed all of the energy of the cartridge to be spent inside the human target, rather than the bullet passing through. This was deemed satisfactory and the design for the cartridge was accepted as the ".38/200 Cartridge, Revolver Mk I".

After a period of service, it was realized that the 200 gr (13 g) soft lead bullet could arguably contravene the Hague Conventions, which outlawed the use of bullets designed so as to "expand or flatten easily in the human body". A new cartridge was therefore adopted as "Cartridge, Pistol, .380 Mk II" or ".380 Mk IIz", firing a 180 gr (11.7 g) full metal jacket bullet. The .38/200 Mk I loading was retained in service for marksmanship and training purposes. However, after the outbreak of war, supply exigencies and the need to order readily available and compatible ammunition, such as the .38 S&W Super Police, from U.S. sources forced British authorities to issue both the .38/200 Mk I and MkII/IIz cartridges interchangeably to forces deploying for combat.

The Cartridge S.A. Ball Revolver .380 inch Mark II and Cartridge S.A. Ball Revolver .380 inch Mark IIz cartridge were theoretically phased out of British service in 1963, when the 9×19mm semi-automatic Browning Hi-Power pistol was finally issued to most British and Commonwealth forces.

== Variants ==
The .38 Colt New Police was Colt's Manufacturing Company's proprietary name for what was essentially the .38 S&W with a flat-nosed bullet.

The U.S. .38 S&W Super Police cartridge was nearly identical to the British .38/200 Mk I, using a 200 gr (13 g) lead alloy bullet with a muzzle velocity of 630 ft/s (190 m/s) and a muzzle energy of 176 ft⋅lbf (239 J), and was supplied by several U.S. manufacturers to the British government as equivalent to the Mk I loading.

MKE 9.65 mm Normal (9.2×23mmR (.38 Smith & Wesson)) cartridge has a 177 gr (11.5 g) lead-antimony alloy bullet with a gilding-metal full metal jacket and a Boxer-primed brass case. The "normal" designation differentiates it from their 9.65mm Special (9.1×29mmR (.38 Special)) round. It uses the 9.65mm (.38-caliber) nominal bore rather than its 9.2mm (.361-caliber) actual bore. It has a muzzle velocity of 590 ft/s (180 m/s).

== Current status ==
The .380 Mk IIz is still produced by the Ordnance Factory Board in India, for use in revolvers. Commercially, only Ruger makes limited runs of revolvers (e.g., Service Six) in this caliber for overseas sales, and only a few companies still manufacture ammunition. Most of those that do so offer it in only a 145 gr (9.4 g) lead round-nose bullet, though Fiocchi still markets full metal jacket bullet rounds. Some companies, such as Buffalo Bore, manufacture several different types of ammunition for self-defense and/or hunting.

== See also ==
- Colt Official Police Revolver
- Colt Police Positive Revolver
- Enfield No. 2 revolver
- List of rimmed cartridges
- Smith & Wesson Model 10
- Table of handgun and rifle cartridges
- Webley revolver
