= Smith & Wesson Model 1905 =

Smith & Wesson Military & Police Model of 1905
- Type: Revolver
- Place of origin: United States

Service history
- In service: 1905 - Present

Production history
- Designed: 1905
- Manufacturer: Smith & Wesson
- Produced: 1905 - 1942
- No. built: 937,000+

Specifications
- Mass: 28 oz. (6.5" bbl)
- Length: 8.75" (4" bbl), 11.25" (6.5" bbl)
- Width: 1.4375" (1 7/16") - cylinder
- Height: 4.75"
- Cartridge: .38 Special
- Caliber: .357 in (9.1 mm)
- Barrels: 2", 4", 5", 6", or 6.5"
- Action: Double action
- Feed system: Six-round fluted cylinder
- Sights: Fixed or adjustable

The .38 Smith & Wesson Military & Police Model of 1905 is the third of Smith & Wesson's .38 Hand Ejector models. Later models in this series include the .38 Military & Police Victory Model and the S&W Model 10. The Model 1905, as with the other .38 Hand Ejector models, is a six-shot revolver built on the Smith and Wesson K frame, with a swing-out cylinder chambered in .38 Special. At various times throughout its production, it was offered with a round or square butt grip frame; checkered walnut or hard rubber grip stocks; with or without a lanyard ring on the butt; blue, nickel, or chrome (produced in very small quantities) finish; and a barrel length of 2", 4", 5", 6", or 6.5". This model had a "five screw" frame, with four screws holding the side plate and one screw at the front of the trigger guard.

== Variations ==
Four minor design changes were made during the production run of the Model 1905, with two, the 1st and 2nd changes, overlapping in manufacture. Additionally, at approximately serial number 316648, the factory began heat treating cylinders.

.38 Military & Police Model of 1905 - 10,800 manufactured c. 1905 - 1906
.38 Military & Police Model of 1905 1st and 2nd change - 73,648 manufactured c. 1906 - 1909
.38 Military & Police Model of 1905 3rd change - 94,803 manufactured c. 1909 - 1915
.38 Military & Police Model of 1905 4th Change - 758,296 manufactured c. 1915 - 1942

== Users ==
China: Indigenous copies chambered for .32 S&W Long
