= Colt Official Police =

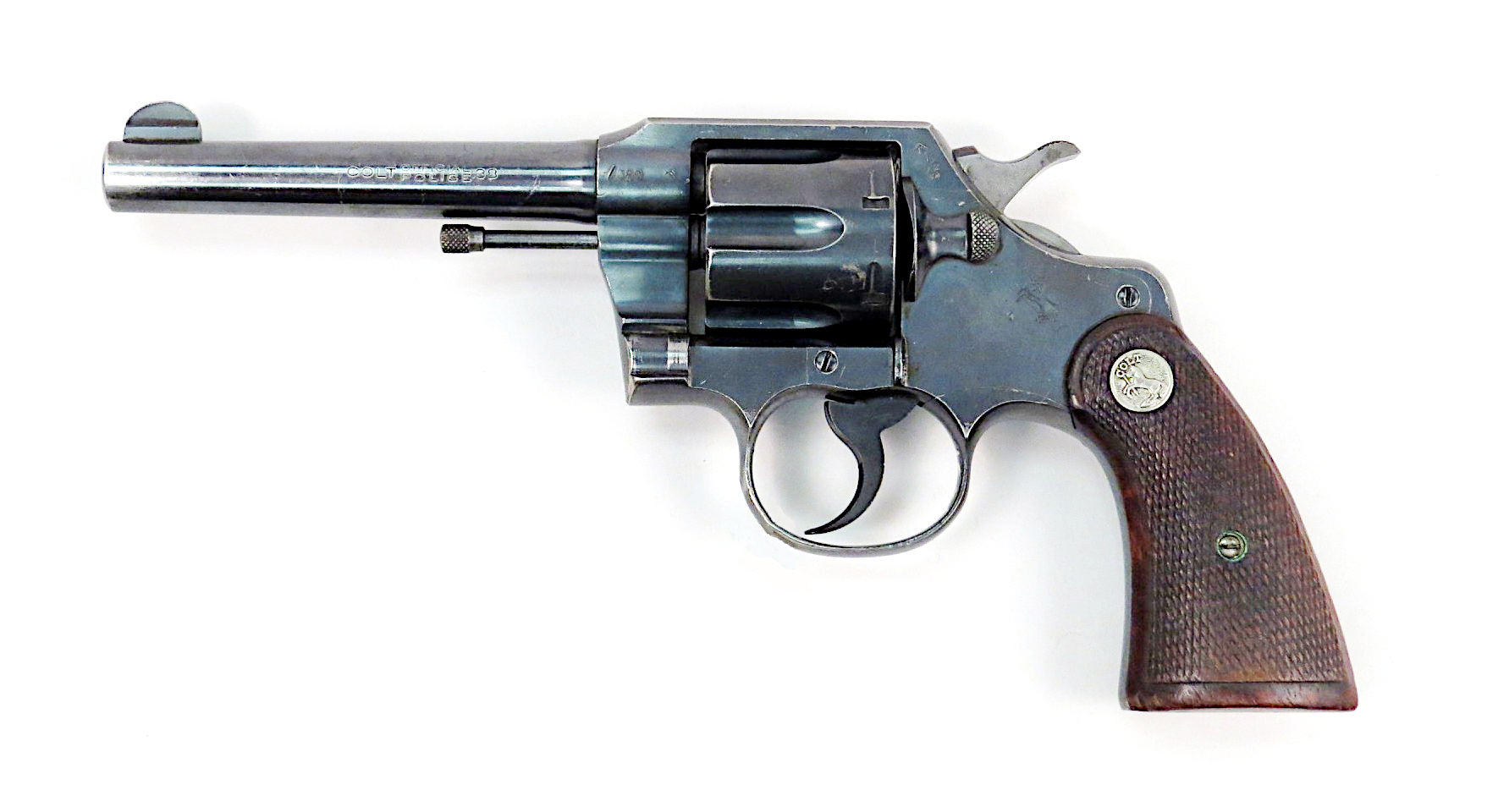
- Type: Revolver
- Place of origin: United States

Service history
- Used by: See users
- Wars: Southern Russia intervention World War II

Production history
- Manufacturer: Colt's Manufacturing Company
- Produced: 1907–1969
- No. built: 1,000,000
- Variants: See variants

Specifications
- Barrel length: 4 in (102 mm); 5 in (127 mm); 6 in (153 mm)
- Cartridge: .22 Long Rifle; .32-20; .38 Special; .38/200; .41 Long Colt
- Action: Double-action
- Feed system: Six round cylinder
- Sights: Fixed iron: Blade front, V-notch rear

The Colt Official Police is a medium frame, double-action revolver with a six-round cylinder, primarily chambered for the .38 Special cartridge, and manufactured by the Colt's Manufacturing Company. Released in 1908 as the Colt Army Special, the revolver was renamed the "Colt's Official Police" in 1927 in order to better market to law enforcement agencies. It became one of the bestselling police firearms of all time, eventually coming to exemplify typical law enforcement officer weaponry in the 1950s. The Official Police was also used by various U.S. and allied military forces during World War II.

== Development and history ==
As the 20th Century began, the older .32 caliber revolvers which had been standard-issue for the majority of American police departments began to be phased out in favor of the larger-bore .38 caliber. In 1908, Colt introduced a sleek and modernized revolver they dubbed the Army Special, which in the powerful (for the time) and popular .38 Special quickly became the issue service revolver of many departments. During the same period, revolvers began to fall out of favor with the U.S. Military, especially after the adoption on the M1911 semi-automatic pistol. As military sales of their revolvers dropped off, Colt realized the popularity and strong sales of their pistols with civilian law enforcement agencies could form a replacement market.

By 1927, the overwhelming sales of two popular models, the Army Special and Colt Police Positive, had assured Colt's dominance of the law enforcement firearms market. Colt's marketing strategy was further fine-tuned by making a few superficial alterations to the Army Special revolver and then renaming it as the "Official Police" model. The changes included adding checkering to the trigger, matting the topstrap of the frame and widening the rear sight groove. Colt also upgraded the quality of the gun's finish from a dull blued finish to a highly polished blued surface. In 1930, Colt publicized that their Official Police model could easily handle the firing of heavily loaded .38 rounds intended for competitor Smith & Wesson's new large N-frame revolver, the .38-44. None of the comparable S&W revolvers could safely manage this feat. By 1933, the Colt sales catalog listed many law enforcement agencies as having adopted the OP as a sidearm, including the New York City, Los Angeles, Chicago, Kansas City, Compton and Signal Hill, and other police departments. In addition, many state police organizations and even the Federal Bureau of Investigation chose the OP as their issue revolver. The U.S. Army also bought some of the revolvers, issuing them to military police and to federal agencies in need of a revolver for their armed agents, such as the Treasury Department, Coast Guard, and Postal Inspection Service. Many Official Police revolvers were also bought by the police forces and militaries of various South American countries.

Between May 1940 and June 1941, 49,764 Official Police revolvers in .38 New Police or .38/200 caliber were purchased by the British Purchasing Commission and shipped to the United Kingdom for use by British and Commonwealth armed forces as a substitute standard sidearm. These revolvers bore British military acceptance markings, had a 5" barrel, and the butt was fitted with a military-style lanyard ring. Most of these OP revolvers were assembled from commercial-grade parts made before 1942.

When the U.S. became involved in World War II, the U.S. government requested contracts to supply .38 revolvers required for arming security personnel charged with the security of government buildings, shipyards, and defense plant installations against sabotage or theft. Commencing in 1941, small quantities of the .38 Colt Official Police were procured directly from the Defense Supplies Corporation (DSC). When government purchasing officials objected to production delays of the OP, as well as the unit cost, Colt responded by simplifying the gun. Savings were achieved by eliminating all unnecessary exterior polishing operations, substituting a smooth-face trigger and hammer, and fitting the gun with simplified checkered wood grips with the Colt medallion; the latter was soon replaced by 'Coltwood' molded plastic grips. Instead of the normal bluing, the revolver was given a dull Parkerizing finish. Dubbed the Colt Commando, the new weapon was primarily used to arm units of Military police, security guards at U.S. defense plant installations and shipyards, as well as limited clandestine issue to agencies involved in overseas espionage and military intelligence.

In mid-1942, the Springfield Ordnance District (SOD) was given control over procurement and distribution of the Commando, which transferred the revolvers to the end user. A few Commandos were shipped to the U.S. Maritime Commission and used as small arms equipment on U.S. merchant ships and ships provided to the Allies under Lend-Lease. Most Commando wartime production went to the DSC for use by security and police forces, while approximately 1,800 Commandos were used by the U.S. Navy, and another 12,800 revolvers distributed to various military intelligence agencies. Control over procurement changed in 1944, after the DSC formally objected to being charged additional handling fees by the armed forces, and was then authorized to procure the Commando directly from Colt.

After World War II, Colt resumed commercial production and returned to the prewar polished blued finish, but retained the 'Coltwood' grips until 1954 when the checkered wooden grips were reintroduced. During the postwar period, Colt fell on difficult financial times and the company introduced few new models. At Smith & Wesson, both output and new model civilian and police sales improved, and the sales margin gap between the two corporations progressively tightened. Finally, in the 1960s, S&W took over the lead. A contributing factor to this change may have been Smith & Wesson's generally lower cost per unit, accompanied by a double-action trigger pull on their Model 10 that was preferred by many agencies teaching the new combat-oriented double-action revolver training. Colt announced the discontinuation of the Official Police in 1969, stating that competitive production of the design was no longer economically feasible. With a total production of over 400,000 pistols, the Official Police ranks as one of the most successful handguns ever made.

== Features ==
The Official Police was machined of fine carbon steel, with blued or nickel-plated finishes, and was offered in 4, 5 and 6 inches (100, 130 and 150 mm) barrels. Built on Colt's .41 or "E" frame, it was manufactured in a variety of chamberings, including .22 LR, .32-20 (discontinued in 1942), .41 Long Colt (discontinued in 1938), and the most common and popular, the .38 Special. Colt's "Positive Lock" firing pin block safety is a standard feature of the revolver, preventing the firing pin from striking the primer unless the trigger is deliberately pulled. The pistol's sights consist of a blade front and a simple U-notch shaped groove milled into the revolver's top strap. The top strap has a matte finish to reduce glare down the sight plane.

== Variants ==
=== Commando ===
The Commando was a wartime variant of the Official Police, manufactured with either a two or four inch barrel, and incorporating several production economies including a non-gloss Parkerized finish. The Commando also lacked the usual metal checkering on the hammer, trigger, and cylinder latch, as well as the reflection-deadening treatment of the commercial version's top strap. In addition, plastic material replaced the wood grips of the civilian model. Approximately 48,611 Commando revolvers were purchased by the government during World War II. Of this total, approximately 12,800 were issued to various intelligence services such as US Military intelligence and the Office of Strategic Services (OSS). Many of the latter were procured with the two-inch barrel, referred to as the "Junior Commando". A few Commandos saw service overseas in the war zone. Regular production deliveries of two-inch "Junior Commando" revolvers began in March 1943, at approximately serial number 9,000. More than 12,000 of the two-inch Commandos encountered today are actually postwar conversions from four-inch models produced during the war.

=== Marshal ===
A rare variant featuring a rounded grip, with barrel lengths of two and four inches. With a very limited production run of 2,500 units produced from 1955 to 1956, the Marshal became a true collectable.

=== MK III ===
The moniker "Official Police" was borrowed by one model in a new generation of revolvers Colt introduced in the late 1960s, called the "MK III" series. MK III models consisted of simpler versions of several classic Colt revolvers with updated lockwork, based on a new "J" frame, which failed to attain commercial success and was cancelled after only three years.

== Users ==
- Greece − Used during the Southern Russia intervention and Greco-Italian War
- Japan − Issued to some prefectural police headquarters in 1949
- United States:
  - Baltimore City Police Department − .38 Special
  - Maryland State Police − 6 inch barrel
  - Pennsylvania State Police − 6 inch barrel
  - New York Police Department

== See also ==
- Enfield No.2
