= Webley Revolver =

Service revolver

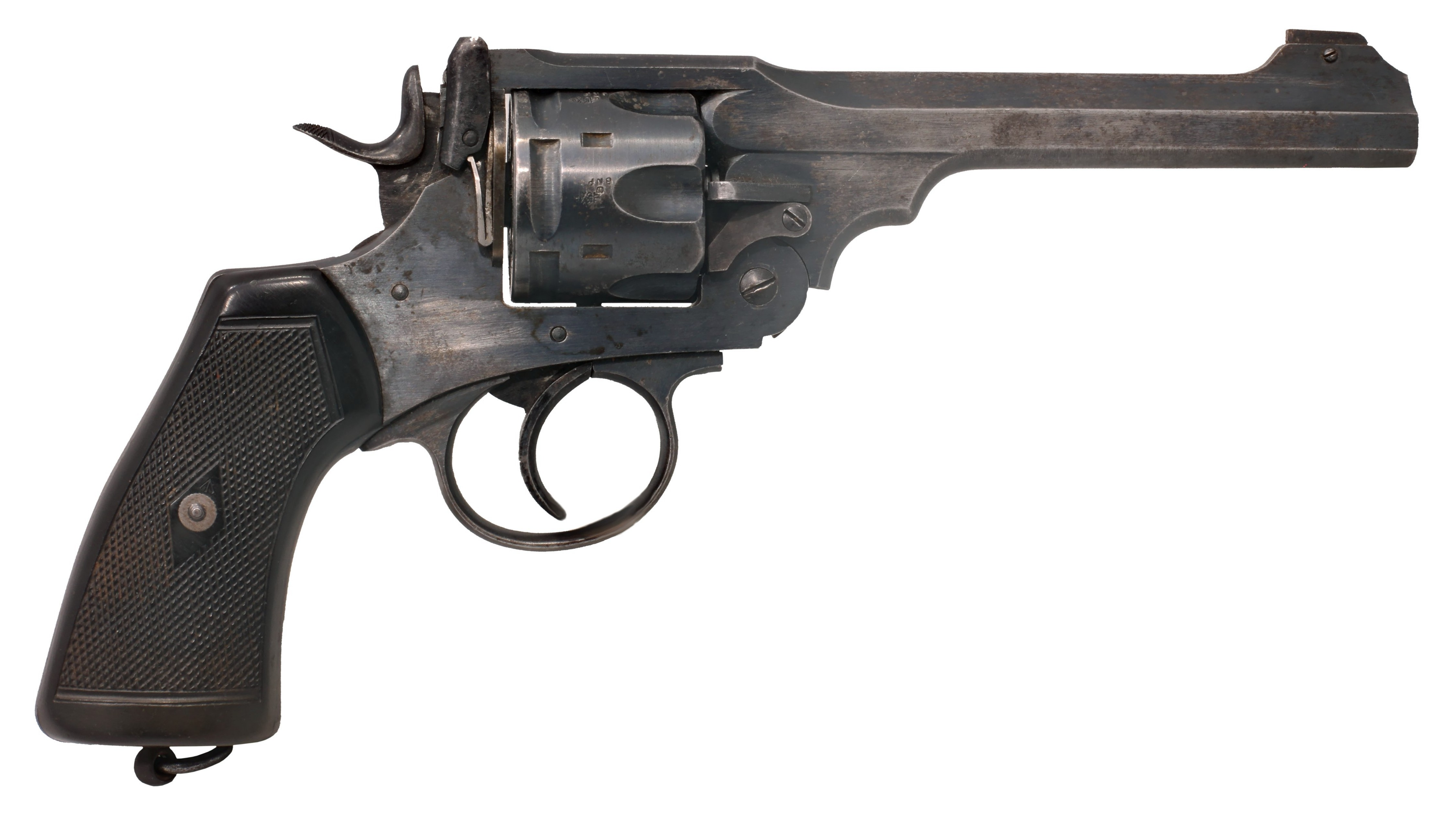
- A Webley Mk. VI top-break revolver.
- Type: Service revolver
- Place of origin: United Kingdom

Service history
- In service: 1887–1963
- Used by: See Users
- Wars: Second Boer War; Boxer Rebellion; World War I Easter Rising; Irish War of Independence; Irish Civil War; World War II; Northern Campaign; Indonesian National Revolution; 1948 Arab-Israeli war Malayan Emergency; First Indochina War; Korean War; Vietnam War; British colonial conflicts Rhodesian Bush War; Border Campaign; The Troubles

Production history
- Designer: Webley & Scott
- Designed: 1887
- Manufacturer: Webley & Scott, RSAF Enfield
- Produced: 1887–1924
- No. built: approx. 125,000

Specifications (Revolver Mk VI)
- Mass: 2.4 lb (1.1 kg), unloaded
- Length: 11.25 in (286 mm)
- Barrel length: 6 in (150 mm)
- Cartridge: .455 Webley Mk II; .45 ACP
- Calibre: .455 (11.6 mm)
- Action: Single or double action
- Rate of fire: 20–30 rounds/minute
- Muzzle velocity: 620 ft/s (190 m/s)
- Effective firing range: 50 yd (46 m)
- Feed system: 6-round cylinder
- Sights: Fixed front blade and rear notch

The Webley Revolver (also known as the Webley Top-Break Revolver or Webley Self-Extracting Revolver) was, in various designations, a standard issue service revolver for the armed forces of the United Kingdom, and countries of the British Empire, from 1887 to 1963.

The Webley is a top-break revolver and breaking the revolver operates the extractor, which removes cartridges from the cylinder. The Webley Mk I service revolver was adopted in 1887, and the Mk IV rose to prominence during the Boer War of 1899–1902. The Mk VI was introduced in 1915, during wartime, and is the best-known model.

Firing large .455 Webley cartridges, Webley service revolvers are among the most powerful top-break revolvers produced. The .455 calibre Webley is no longer in military service. As of 1999, the .38/200 Webley Mk IV variant was still in use as a police sidearm in a number of countries.

== History ==
Webley & Scott (P. Webley & Son before merger with W & C Scott in 1897) produced a range of revolvers from the mid 19th to late 20th centuries. As early as 1853, P. Webley and J. Webley began production of their first patented single action cap and ball revolvers. Later, under the trade name of P. Webley and Son, manufacturing included their own 0.44 in (11 mm) calibre rim-fire solid frame revolver as well as licensed copies of Smith & Wesson's tip up break action revolvers. The quintessential hinged frame, centre-fire revolvers for which the Webley name is best known, first began production/development in the early 1870s, most notably with the Webley-Pryse (1877) and Webley-Kaufman (1881) models.

The W.G. or Webley-Government models produced from 1885 to the early 1900s are the most popular of the commercial top break revolvers, and many were the private purchase choice of British military officers and target shooters in the period, chambered in a .476/.455 calibre. Other short-barrelled solid-frame revolvers, including the Webley RIC (Royal Irish Constabulary) model and the British Bulldog revolver, designed to be carried in a coat pocket for self-defence, were far more commonplace during the period. Today, the best-known are the range of military revolvers, which were in service use in two World Wars and numerous colonial conflicts.

In 1887, the British Army was searching for a revolver to replace the largely unsatisfactory .476 Enfield Mk I & Mk II revolvers, the Enfield having only replaced the solid frame Adams .450 revolver which was a late 1860s conversion of the cap and ball Beaumont–Adams revolver in 1880. Webley & Scott, who were already very well-known makers of quality guns and had sold many pistols on a commercial basis to military officers and civilians alike, tendered the .455 calibre Webley Self-Extracting Revolver for trials. The military was suitably impressed with the revolver (it was seen as a vast improvement over the Enfield revolvers then in service, as the American-designed Owen extraction system did not prove particularly satisfactory), and it was adopted on 8 November 1887 as the "Pistol, Webley, Mk I". The initial contract called for 10,000 Webley revolvers, at a price of £3/1/1 each, with at least 2,000 revolvers to be supplied within eight months.

The Webley revolver underwent numerous changes, culminating in the Mk VI, which was in production between 1915 and 1923. The Mk VI was also produced by the Enfield arsenal between 1921 and 1926. The large .455 Webley revolvers were retired in 1947, although the Webley Mk IV .38/200 remained in service until 1963 alongside the Enfield No. 2 Mk I revolver. Commercial versions of all Webley service revolvers were also sold on the civilian market, along with several similar designs (such as the Webley-Government and Webley-Wilkinson) that were not officially adopted for service, but were nonetheless purchased privately by military officers. Webley's records show the last Mk VI was sold from the factory in 1957, with "Nigeria" noted against the entry.

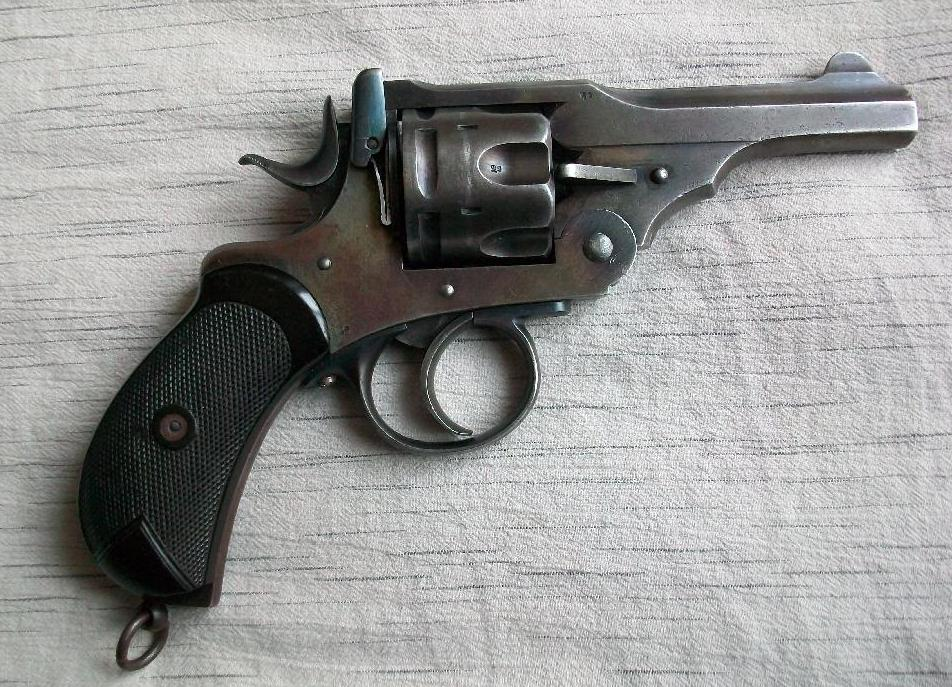
A Webley Mark I Revolver, circa 1887, from Canada, cal .455 (Mk I) Webley

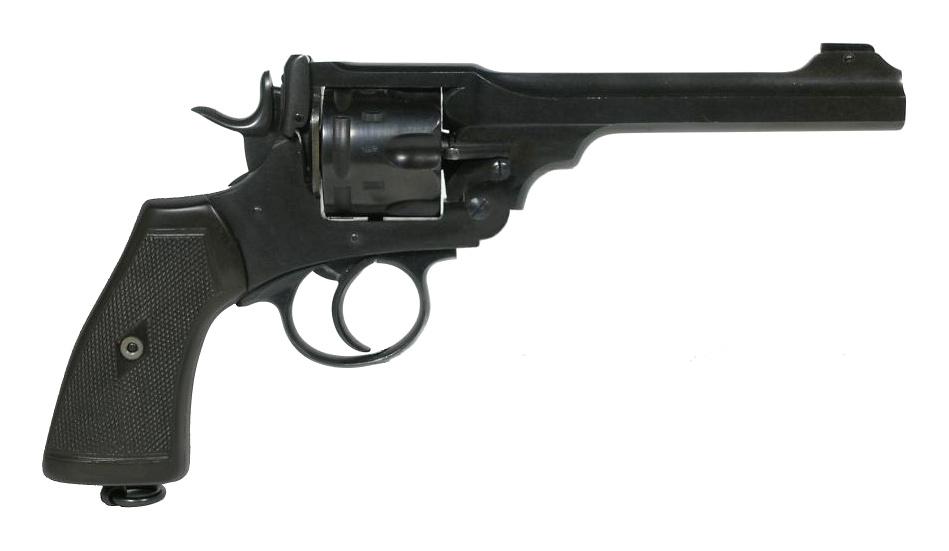
Webley Mark VI .455 service revolver

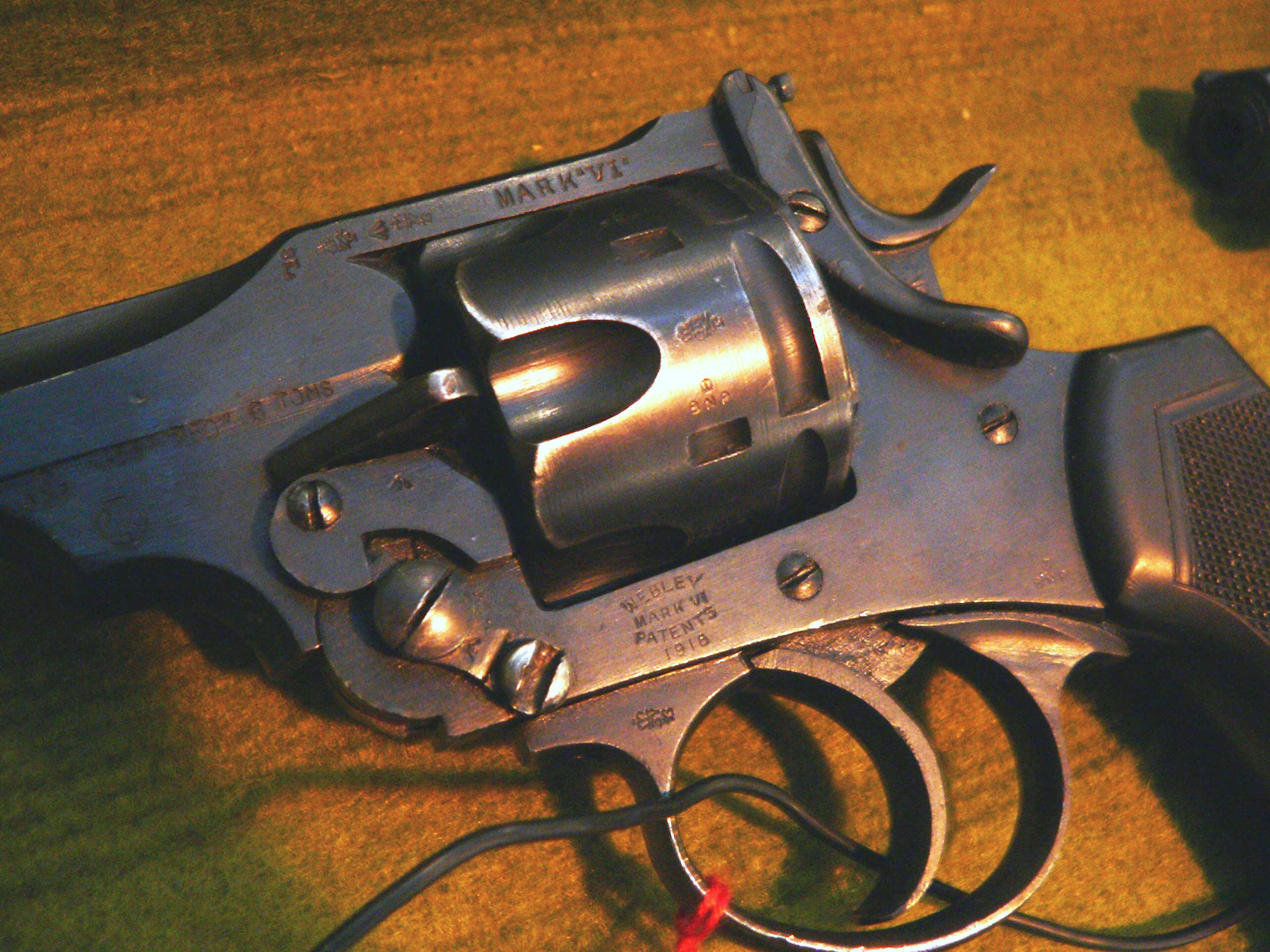
Close up of the cylinder (including thumb catch) on a Webley Mk VI service revolver

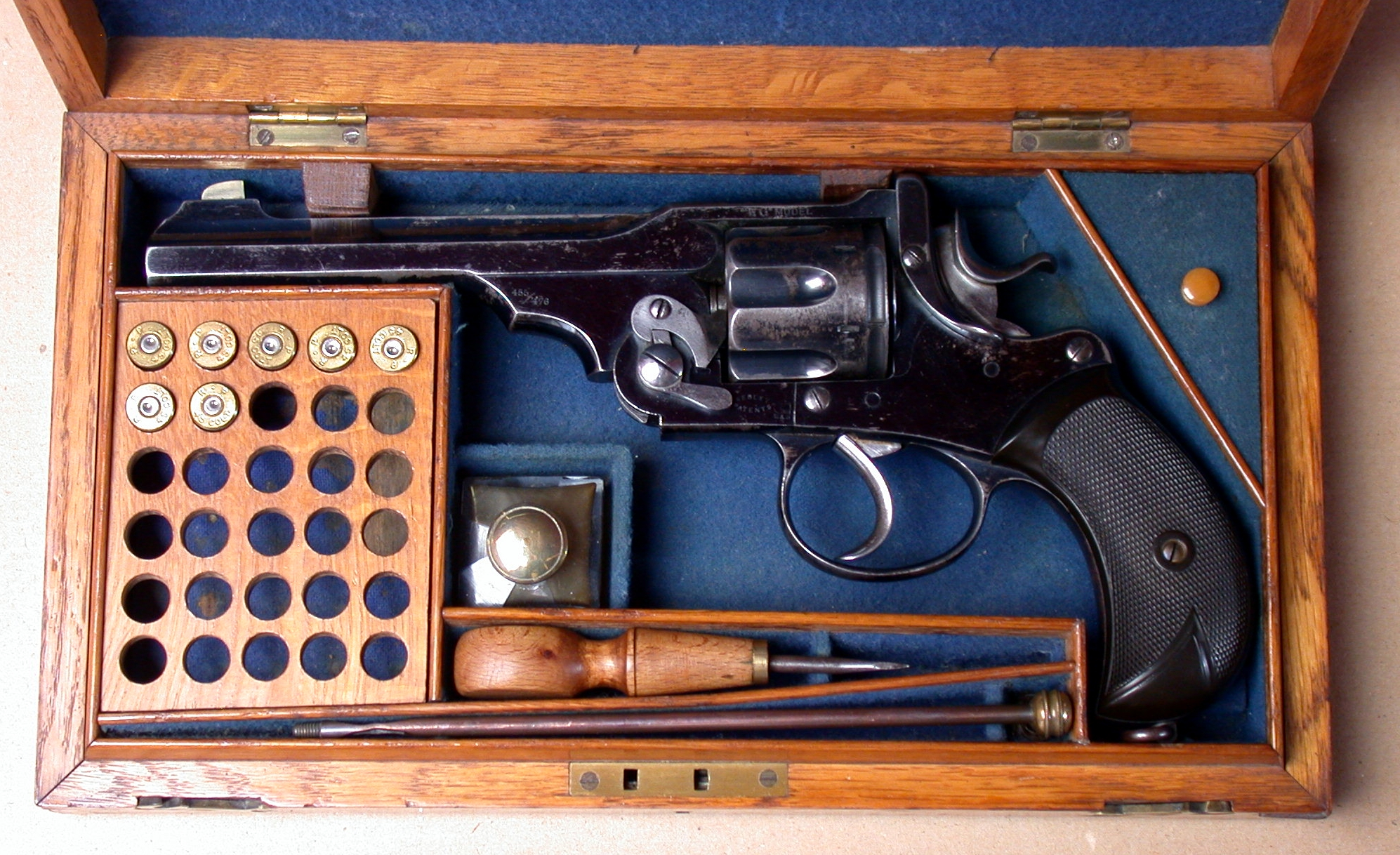
Webley WG Revolver .455/476 (.476 Enfield)

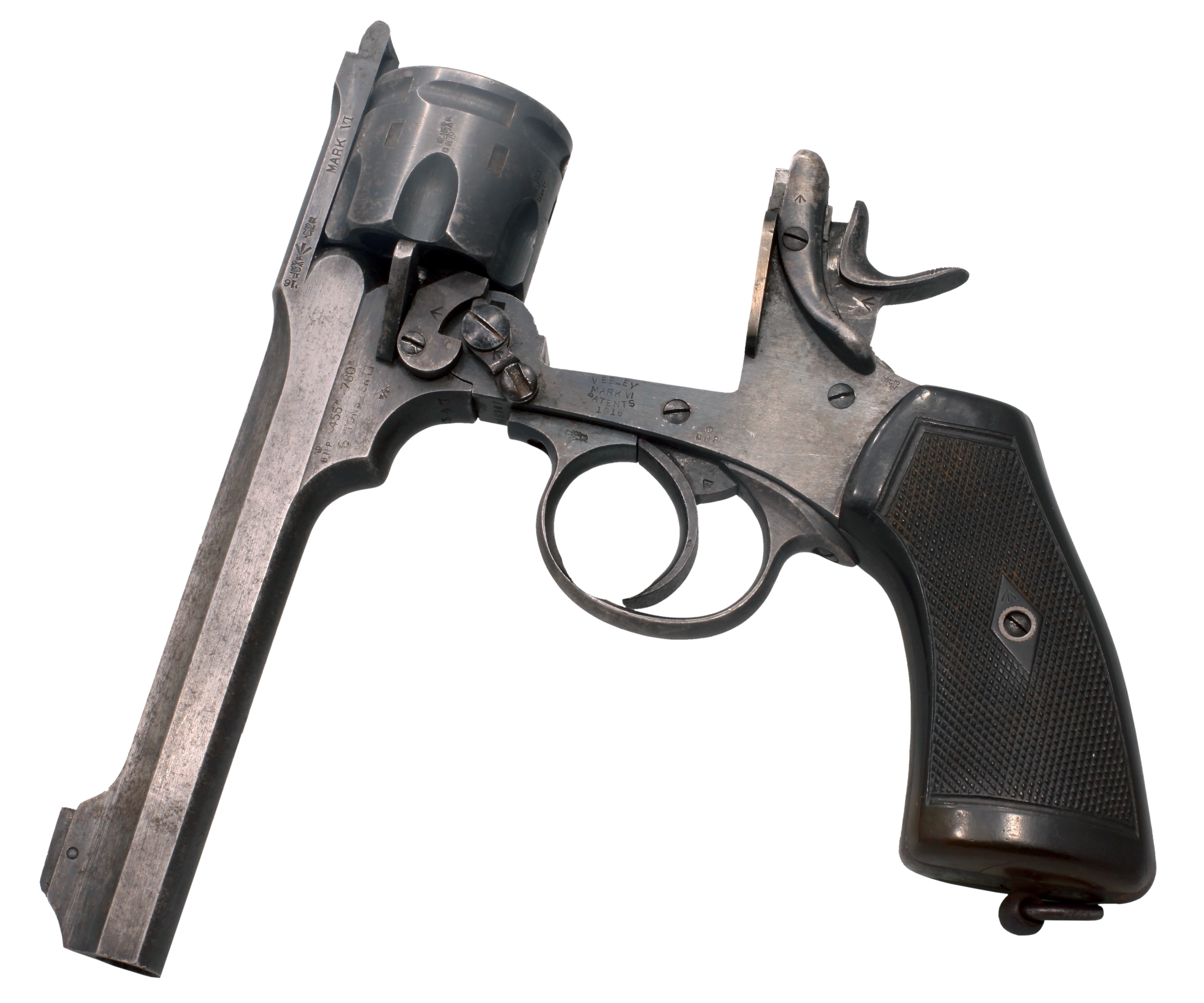
A Webley Revolver, opened

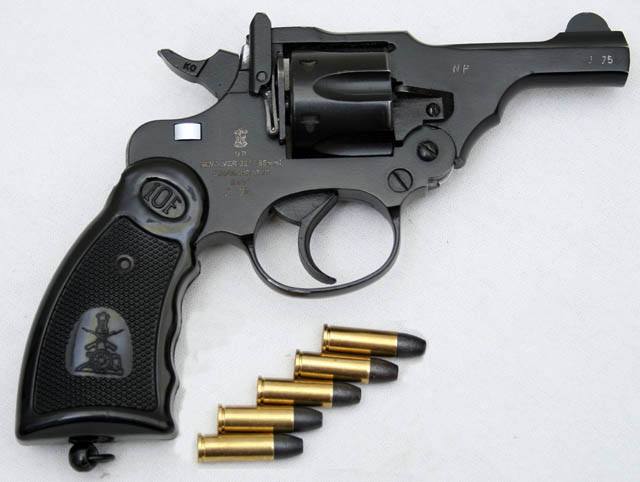
The IOF .32 Revolver is a derivative of a Webley produced in India

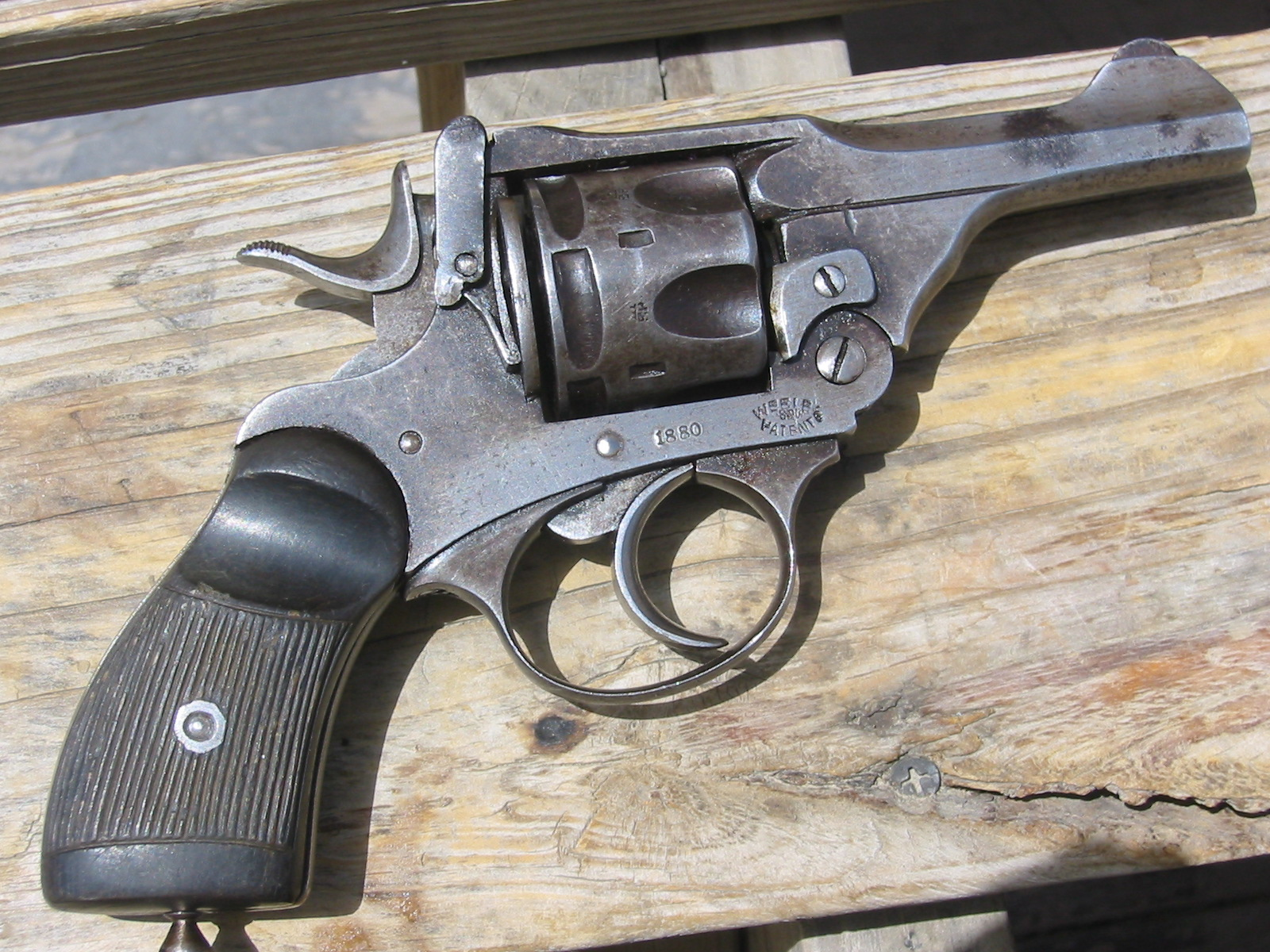
Fake Webley Pocket Pistol (in .38 S&W) at Bagram Airfield, Afghanistan

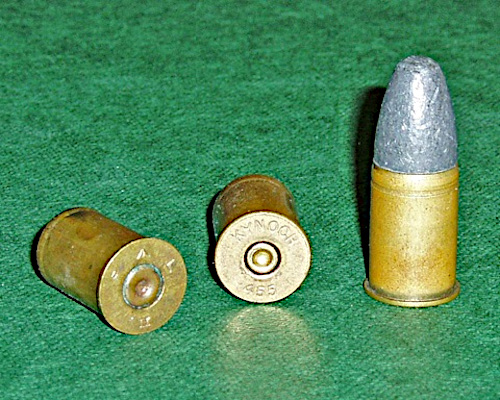
.455 in SAA Ball ammunition.

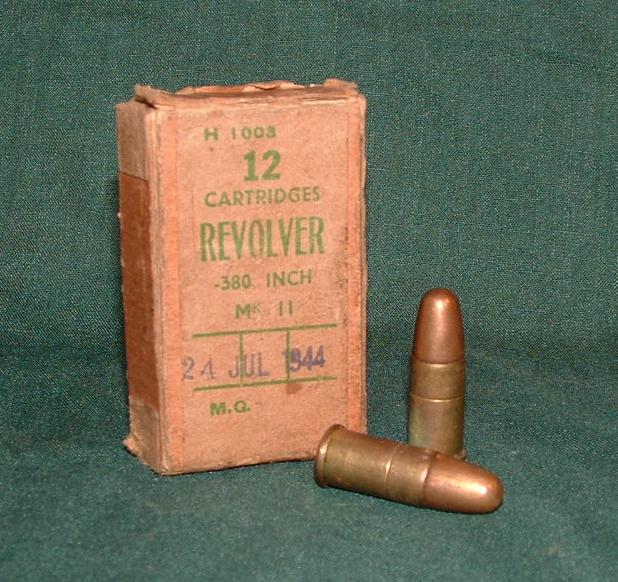
A box of Second World War dated 24 July 1944 in .380 Revolver Mk IIz cartridges

== In military service ==
=== Boer War ===
The Webley Mk IV, chambered in .455 Webley, was introduced in 1899 and soon became known as the "Boer War Model", on account of the large numbers of officers and non-commissioned officers who purchased it on their way to take part in the conflict. The Webley Mk IV served alongside a large number of other handguns, including the Mauser C96 "Broomhandle" (as used by Winston Churchill during the War), earlier Beaumont–Adams cartridge revolvers, and other top-break revolvers manufactured by gunmakers such as William Tranter, and Kynoch.

=== First World War ===
The standard-issue Webley revolver at the outbreak of the First World War was the Webley Mk V (adopted 9 December 1913), but there were considerably more Mk IV revolvers in service in 1914, as the initial order for 20,000 Mk V revolvers had not been completed when hostilities began. They were issued first to officers, pipers and range takers, and later to airmen, naval crews, boarding parties, trench raiders, machine-gun teams, and tank crews. They were then issued to many Allied soldiers as a sidearm. The Mk VI proved to be a very reliable and hardy weapon, well suited to the mud and adverse conditions of trench warfare, and several accessories were developed for the Mk VI, including a bayonet (made from a converted French Gras bayonet), speedloader devices (the "Prideaux Device" and the Watson design), and a stock allowing for the revolver to be converted into a carbine.

Demand exceeded production, which was already behind as the war began. This forced the British government to buy substitute weapons chambered in .455 Webley from neutral countries. America provided the Smith & Wesson 2nd Model "Hand Ejector" and Colt New Service Revolvers. Spanish gunsmiths in Eibar made acceptable copies of popular guns and were chosen to close the gap cheaply by making a .455 variant of their 11mm M1884 or "S&W Model 7 ONÁ" revolver, a copy of the Smith & Wesson .44 Double Action First Model. The Pistol, Revolver, Old Pattern, No. 1 Mk. 1 was by Garate, Anitua y Cia. and the Pistol, Revolver, Old Pattern, No.2 Mk.1 was by Trocaola, Aranzabal y Cia. Orbea Hermanos y Cia. made 10,000 pistols. Rexach & Urgoite was tapped for an initial order of 500 revolvers, but they were rejected due to defects.

=== Second World War ===
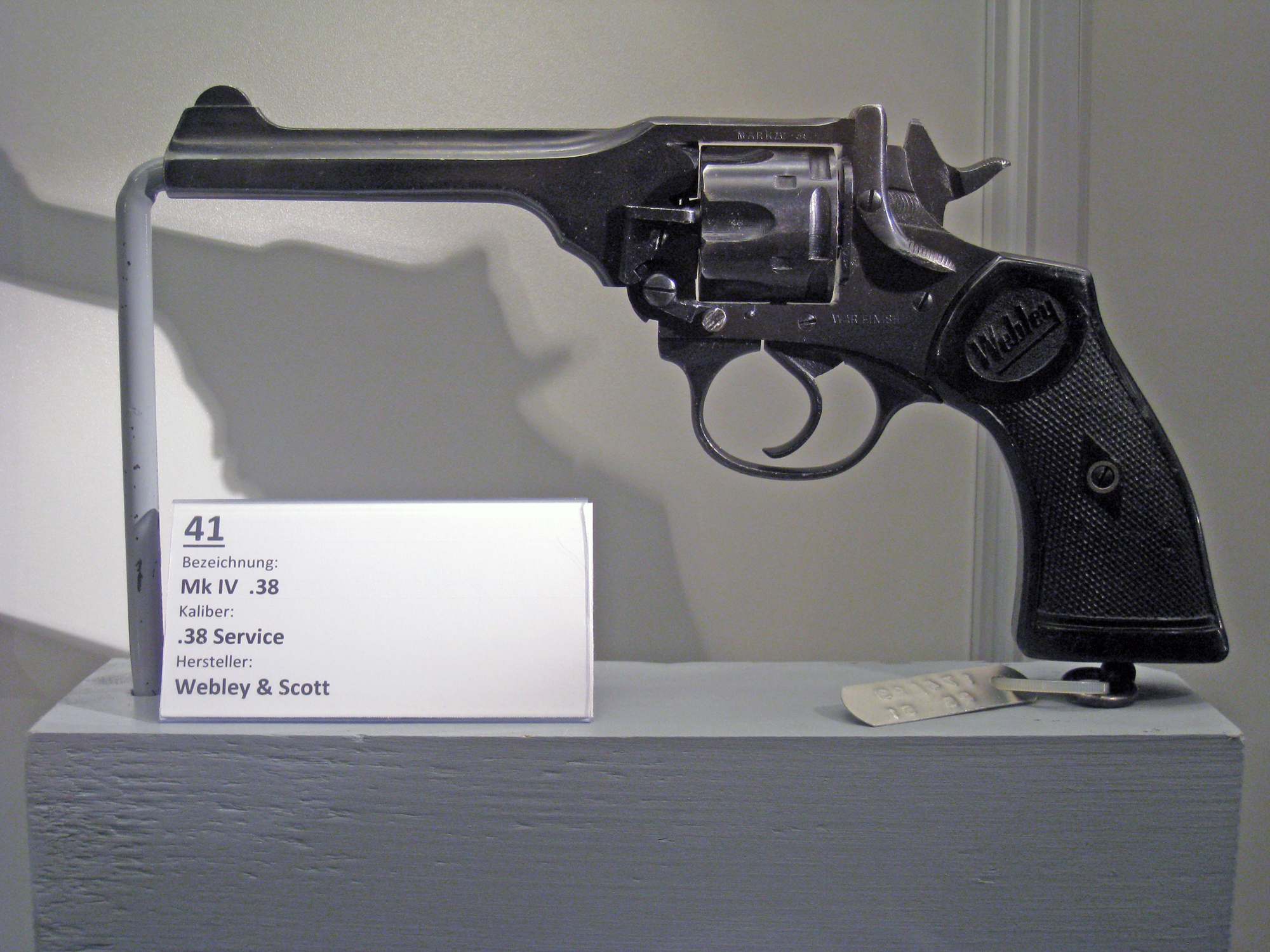
Webley Mk IV in .38

The official service pistol for the British military during the Second World War was the Enfield No. 2 Mk I .38/200 calibre revolver. Owing to a critical shortage of handguns, several other weapons were also adopted (first practically, then officially) to alleviate the shortage. As a result, both the Webley Mk IV in .38/200 and Webley Mk VI in .455 calibre were issued to personnel during the war.

=== Post-war use ===
The Webley Mk VI (.455) and Mk IV (.38/200) revolvers were still issued to British and Commonwealth forces after the Second World War; there were extensive stockpiles of the revolvers in military stores, yet they suffered from ammunition shortages. This lack of ammunition was instrumental in keeping the Enfield and Webley revolvers in use so long: they were not wearing out because they were not being used. An armourer stationed in West Germany joked that by the time they were officially retired in 1963, the ammunition allowance was "two cartridges per man, per year."

The Webley Mk IV .38 revolver was not completely replaced by the Browning Hi-Power until 1963, and saw use in the Korean War, the Suez Crisis, Malayan Emergency, and the Rhodesian Bush War. Many Enfield No. 2 Mk I revolvers were still circulating in British military service as late as 1970.

=== Police use ===
The Royal Hong Kong Police and Singapore Police Force were issued Webley Mk III & Mk IV (38S&W then .38/200) revolvers from the 1930s. Singaporean police (and some other "officials") Webleys were equipped with safety catches, a rather unusual feature in a revolver. These were gradually retired in the 1970s as they came in for repair, and were replaced with Smith & Wesson Model 10 .38 revolvers. The Metropolitan Police of London were also known to use Webley revolvers, as were most colonial police units until just after the Second World War. The Royal Canadian Mounted Police and Shanghai Municipal Police received Webley Mk VI revolvers during the interwar period.

The Indian Ordnance Factories Service still manufactures .380 Revolver Mk IIz cartridges, as well as a .32 S&W Long revolver (the IOF .32 Revolver) with 2-inch (51 mm) barrel which is clearly based on the Webley Mk IV .38 service pistol.

=== Military service .455 Webley revolver marks and models ===
There were six different marks of .455 calibre Webley British Government Model revolvers approved for British military service at various times between 1887 and the end of the First World War:

- Mk I: The first Webley self-extracting revolver adopted for service, officially adopted 8 November 1887, with a 4-inch (100 mm) barrel and "bird's beak" style grips. Mk I* was a factory upgrade of Mk I revolvers to match the Mk II.
- Mk II: Similar to the Mk I, with modifications to the hammer and grip shape, as well as a hardened steel shield for the blast-shield. Officially adopted 21 May 1895, with a 4-inch (100 mm) barrel.
- Mk III: Identical to Mk II, but with modifications to the cylinder cam and related parts. Officially adopted 5 October 1897, most were not issued, except for a number that were marked with the "broad arrow" acceptance stamp on the top strap. These few went to the Royal Navy.
- Mk IV: The "Boer War" Model. Manufactured using much higher quality steel and case hardened parts, with the cylinder axis being a fixed part of the barrel, and modifications to various other parts, including a redesigned blast shield. Officially adopted 21 July 1899, with a 4-inch (100 mm) barrel.
- Mk V: Similar to the Mk IV, but with cylinders 0.12-inch (3.0 mm) wider to allow for the use of nitrocellulose propellant-based cartridges. Officially adopted 9 December 1913, with a 4-inch (100 mm) barrel, although some models produced in 1915 had 5-inch (130 mm) and 6-inch (150 mm) barrels.
- Mk VI: Similar to the Mk V, but with a squared-off "target" style grip (as opposed to the "bird's-beak" style found on earlier marks and models) and a 6-inch (150 mm) barrel. Officially adopted 24 May 1915, and also manufactured by RSAF Enfield under the designation Pistol, Revolver, Webley, No. 1 Mk VI 1921–1926.

== The Webley Mk IV .38/200 Service Revolver ==
Webley Mk IV .38/200 Service Revolver
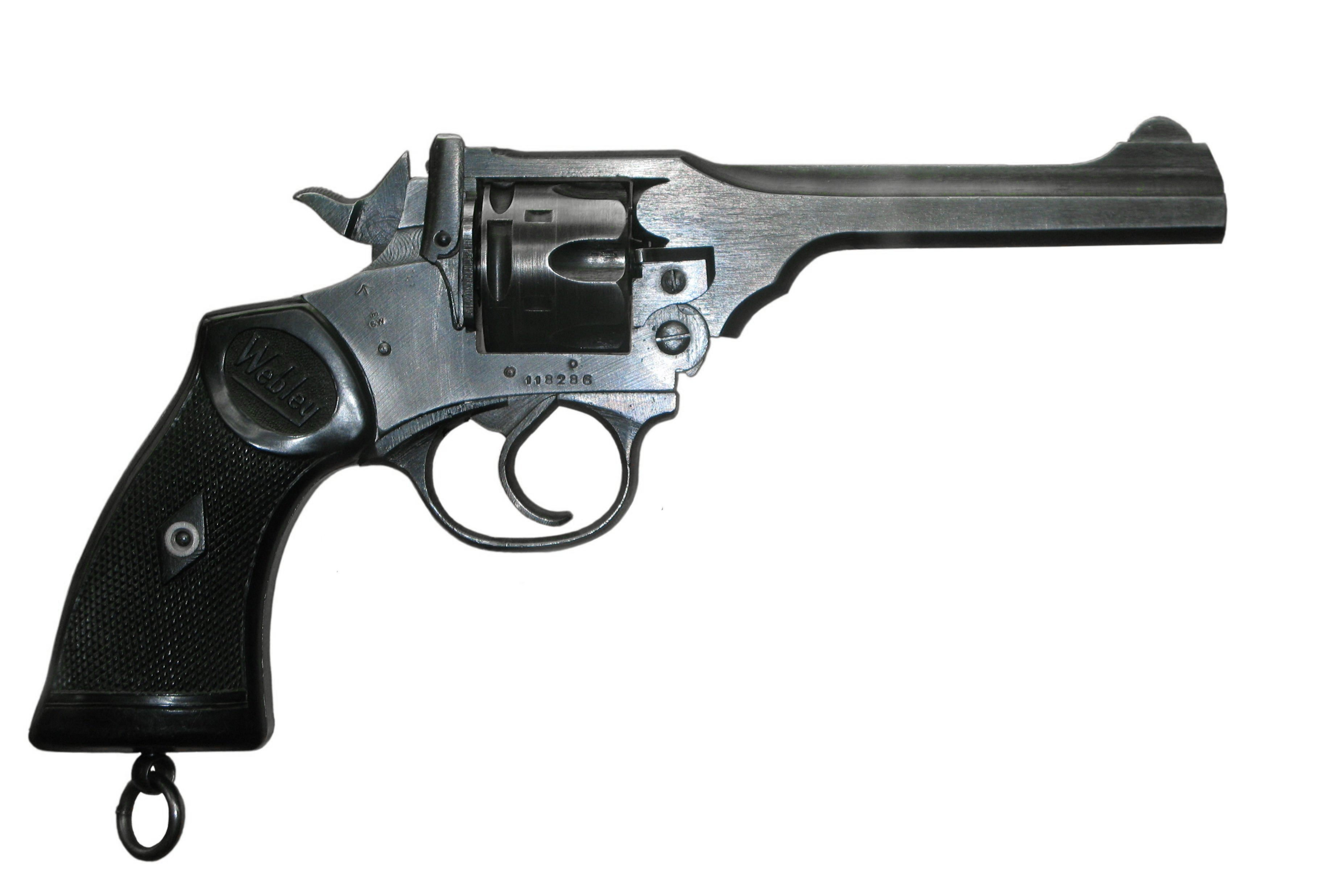
- Type: Service revolver
- Place of origin: British Empire

Service history
- In service: 1932–1963
- Used by: British Empire, Commonwealth of Nations
- Wars: Second World War, Korean War, British colonial conflicts

Production history
- Designer: Webley & Scott
- Designed: 1932
- Manufacturer: Webley & Scott
- Produced: 1932–1978
- No. built: approx. 500,000

Specifications
- Mass: 2.3 lb (995 g), unloaded
- Length: 10.25 in (260 mm)
- Barrel length: 5 in. (125 mm)
- Cartridge: .38 S&W (.380" Revolver Mk IIz)
- Calibre: .38 (9 mm)
- Action: Double action
- Rate of fire: 20–30 rounds/minute
- Muzzle velocity: 620 ft/s (190 m/s)
- Effective firing range: 50 yd (46 m)
- Maximum firing range: 300 yd (270 m)
- Feed system: 6-round cylinder
- Sights: fixed front post and rear notch

At the end of World War I, the British Armed Forces decided that the .455 calibre gun and cartridge were too large for modern military use and concluded, after numerous tests and extensive trials, that a pistol in .38 calibre firing a 200 grains (13 g) bullet would be just as effective as the .455 for stopping an enemy.

Webley & Scott immediately tendered the .38/200 calibre Webley Mk IV revolver, which, as well as being nearly identical in appearance to the .455 calibre Mk VI revolver (albeit scaled down for the smaller cartridge), was based on their .38 calibre Webley Mk III pistol, designed for the police and civilian markets. (The .38 Webley Mk III used black powder cartridges, as did the .455 Webley Mk IV; they should not be fired with the smokeless powder cartridges developed for the .38 Webley Mk IV and .455 Webley Mk V and Mk VI.)

Much to their surprise, the British Government took the design to the Royal Small Arms Factory at Enfield Lock, which came up with a revolver that was externally very similar looking to the .38/200 calibre Webley Mk IV, but was internally different enough that no parts from the Webley could be used in the Enfield and vice versa.

The Enfield-designed pistol was quickly accepted under the designation Pistol, Revolver, No. 2 Mk I, and was adopted in 1932, followed in 1938 by the Mk I* (spurless hammer, double action only), and finally the Mk I** (simplified for wartime production) in 1942.

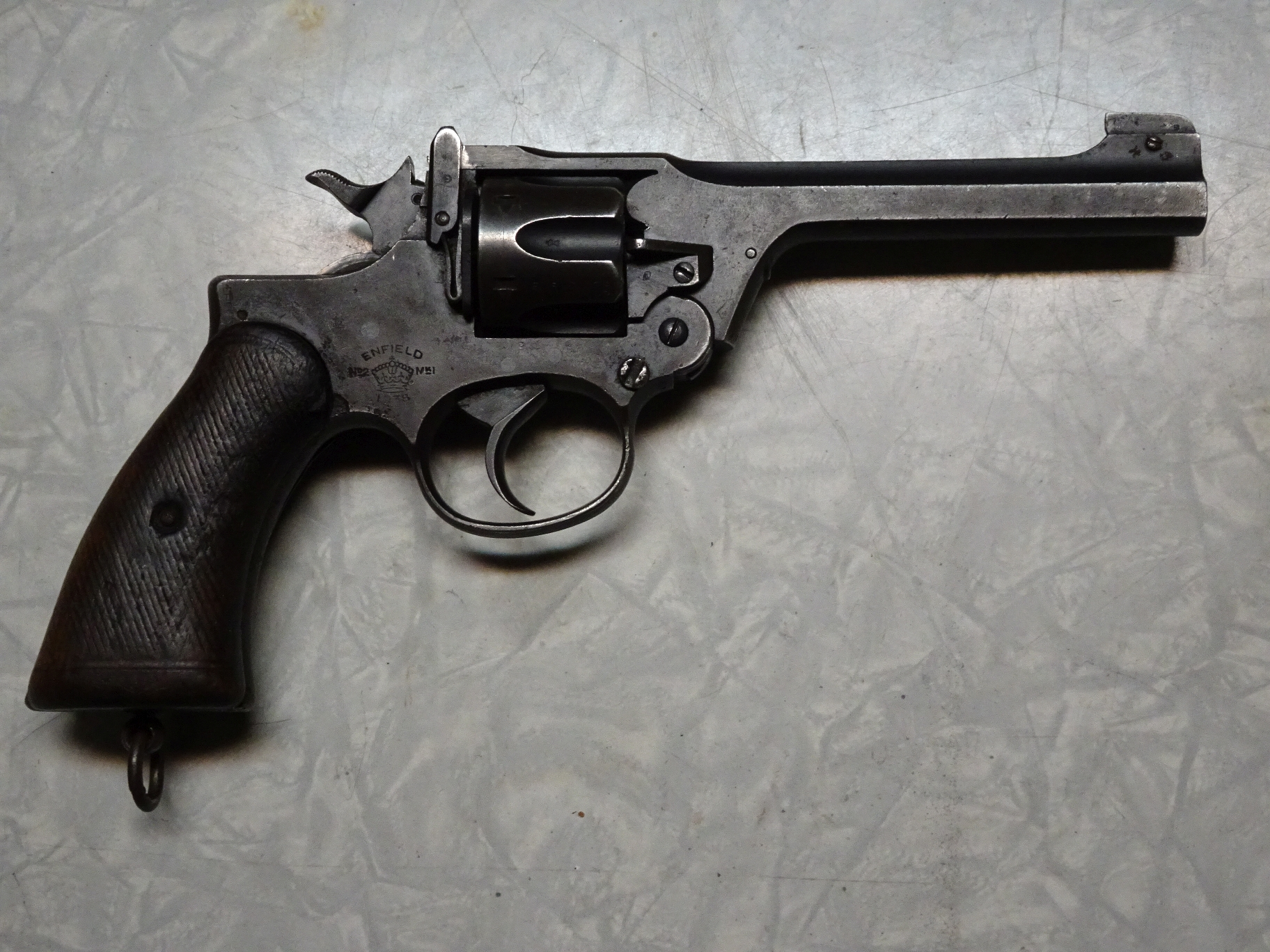
Enfield No. 2 Mk I

Webley & Scott sued the British Government over the incident, claiming £2250 as "costs involved in the research and design" of the revolver.

This was contested by RSAF Enfield, which quite firmly stated that the Enfield No. 2 Mk I was designed by Captain Boys (the Assistant Superintendent of Design, later of Boys anti-tank rifle fame) with assistance from Webley & Scott, and not the other way around. Accordingly, their claim was denied.

By way of compensation, the Royal Commission on Awards to Inventors eventually awarded Webley & Scott £1250 for their work.

RSAF Enfield proved unable to manufacture enough No. 2 revolvers to meet the military's wartime demands, and as a result, Webley's Mk IV was also widely used within the British Army in World War II.

== Webley Mark VI Revolver ==
The Webley Mark VI Revolver was introduced in 1915. It was a modified version of the Webley Mark V and featured a 6 inch barrel and a more ergonomic grip. It was chambered for the .455 Webley (a.k.a. .455 Eley) cartridge. It was noted for its robustness and reliability.

During the war, it was noted that many soldiers had difficulty mastering the higher recoil of the .455 cartridge. As a result, the Webley Mark IV, chambered in .38 Smith and Wesson with a 200 grain bullet (often referred to as ".38/200"), was adopted in 1932. The Mark IV remained the standard issue sidearm of the British Army until the adoption of the Browning Hi-Power in the 1954. However, due to the high number of available Mark VI revolvers, the Mark VI saw extensive service during World War II.

In the late 1950s Mark VI revolvers were sold off as surplus and many were imported into the United States. Due to rarity of the .455 Webley cartridge in the US, most of the revolvers imported into the United States had their cylinders "shaved" to accommodate the more readily available .45 ACP cartridge. Most were sold by sporting goods dealers selling military surplus firearms for prices as low as $14.95 in the late 1950s. Years later, there was concern that firing .45 ACP from a Mark VI revolver could lead to damage to both the gun and the firer as .45 ACP had much higher chamber pressure than the .455 Webley. The current consensus is that only reduced pressure .45 ACP cartridges should be fired from a Webley Mark VI.

== Other Webley revolvers ==
Whilst the top-break, self-extracting revolvers used by the British and other Commonwealth militaries are the best-known examples of Webley revolvers, the company produced several other highly popular revolvers largely intended for the police and civilian markets.

=== Webley RIC ===
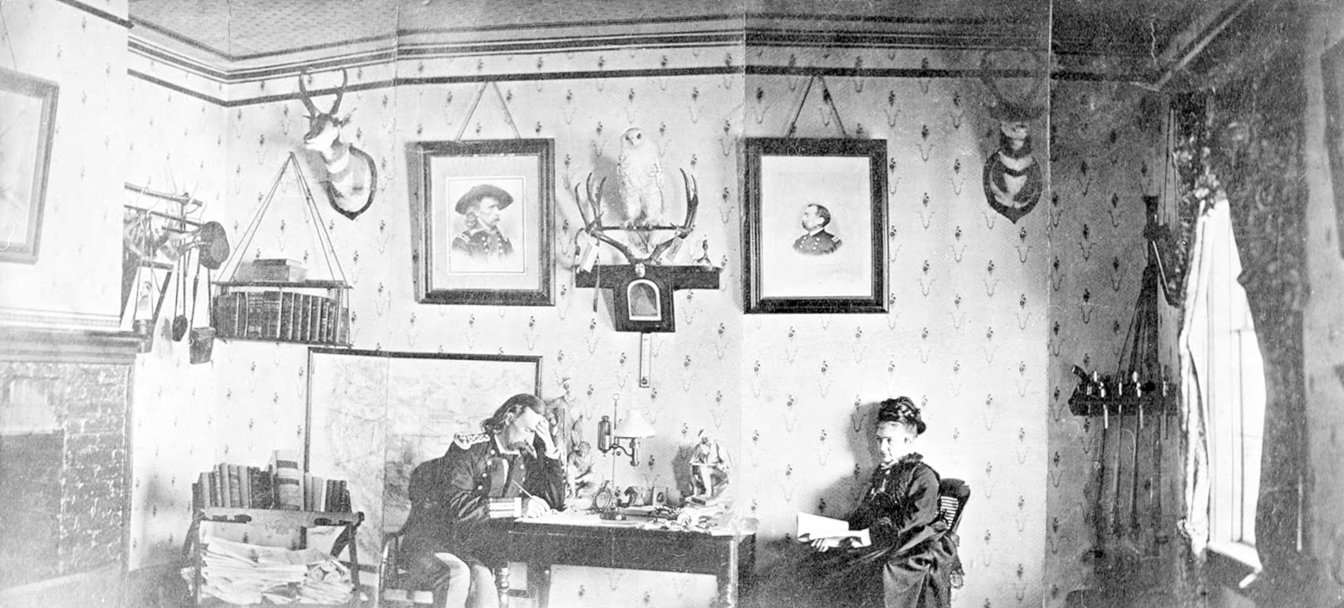
Custer and his wife at Fort Abraham Lincoln, Dakota Territory, 1874. Reportedly, at right in the gun rack is a Webley Revolver used by Custer

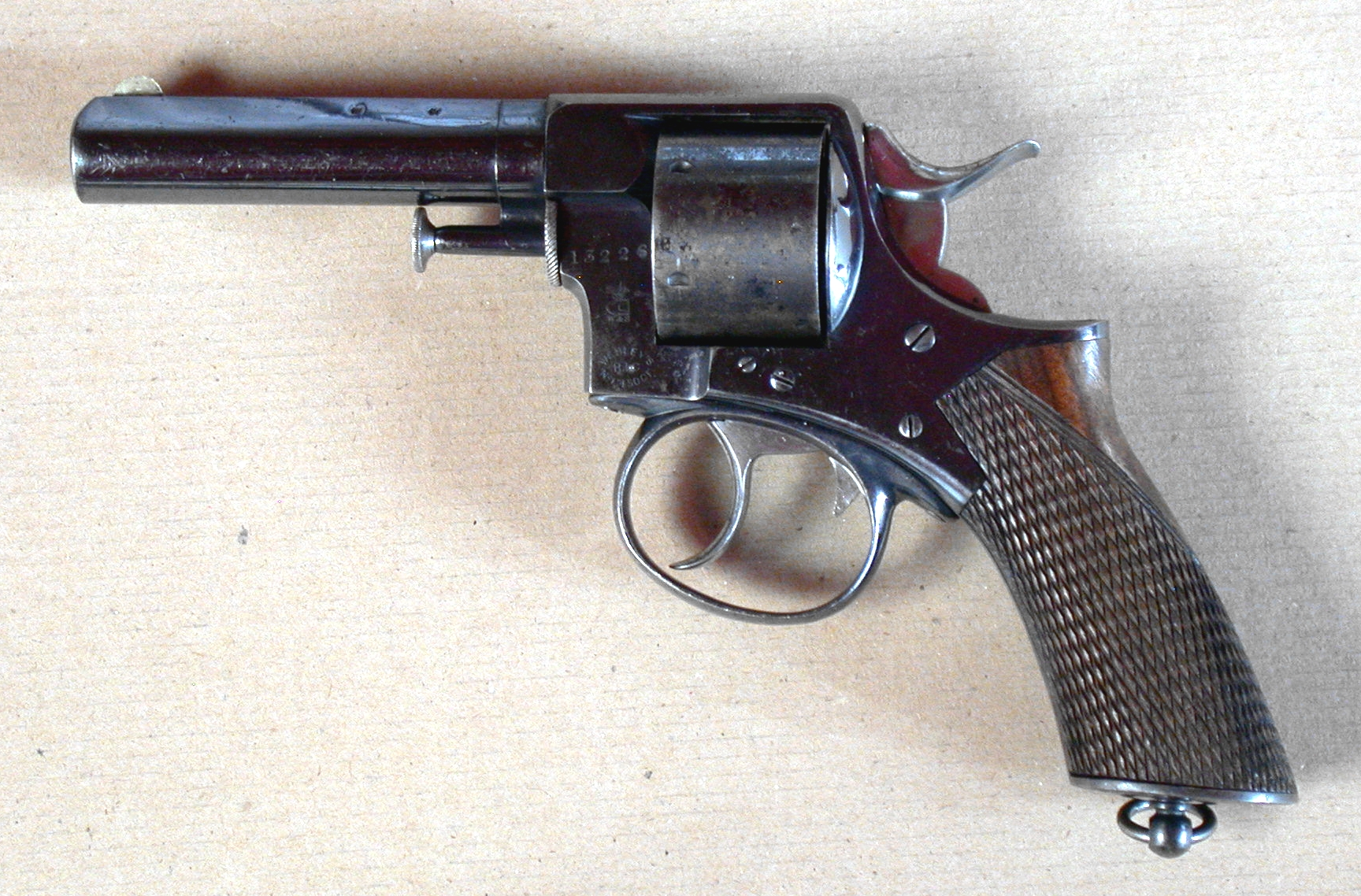
Webley Royal Irish Constabulary revolver

The Webley RIC was Webley's first double-action revolver, and was adopted by the Royal Irish Constabulary (RIC) in 1868, hence the name. It was a solid-frame, gate-loaded revolver, chambered in .442 Webley. George Armstrong Custer of the American Indian Wars was known to have owned a pair, which he is believed to have used at the Battle of the Little Bighorn in 1876.

A small number of early examples were produced in the huge .500 Tranter calibre, and later models were available chambered for the .450 Adams and other cartridges. They were also widely copied in Belgium.

=== British Bull Dog ===
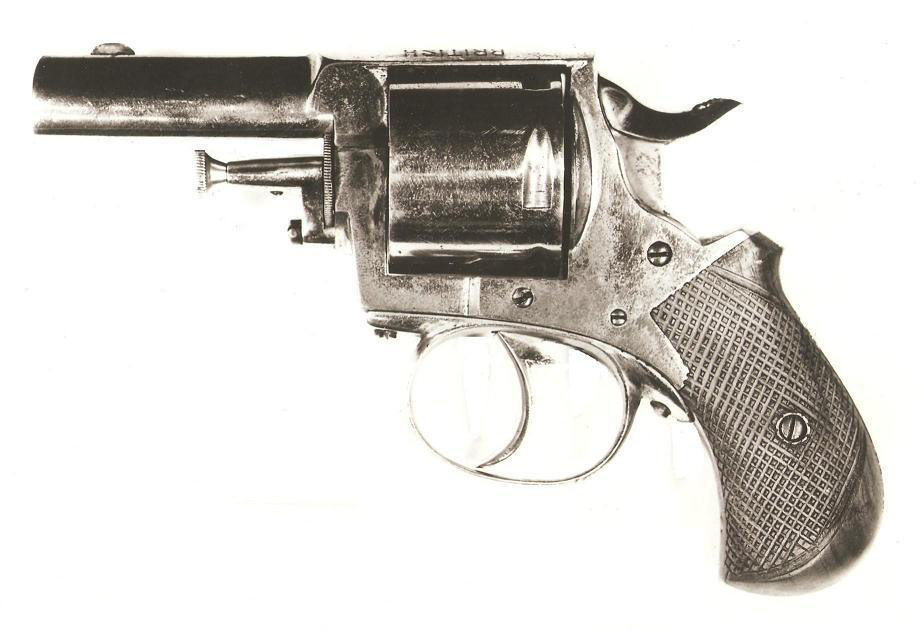
Smithsonian file photograph of the British Bull Dog used by Charles J. Guiteau in the assassination of James A. Garfield in 1881

The British Bull Dog was an enormously successful, solid-frame design introduced by Webley in 1872. It featured a 2.5-inch (64 mm) barrel and was chambered for five .44 Short Rimfire, .442 Webley, or .450 Adams cartridges. (Webley later added smaller scaled five-chambered versions in .320 and .380 calibres, but did not mark them British Bull Dog.) Charles "Charlie" J. Guiteau used a .44 calibre Belgian-made British Bulldog in the assassination of James A. Garfield, President of the United States, on 2 July 1881.

The Bull Dog was designed to be carried in a coat pocket or kept on a bedside table, and many have survived to the present day in good condition, having seen little actual use. Numerous copies of this design were made during the late 19th century in Belgium, with smaller numbers also produced in Spain, France and the US. They remained reasonably popular until World War II, but are now generally sought after only as collectors' pieces, since ammunition for them is for the most part no longer commercially manufactured.

=== Webley-Fosbery Automatic Revolver ===
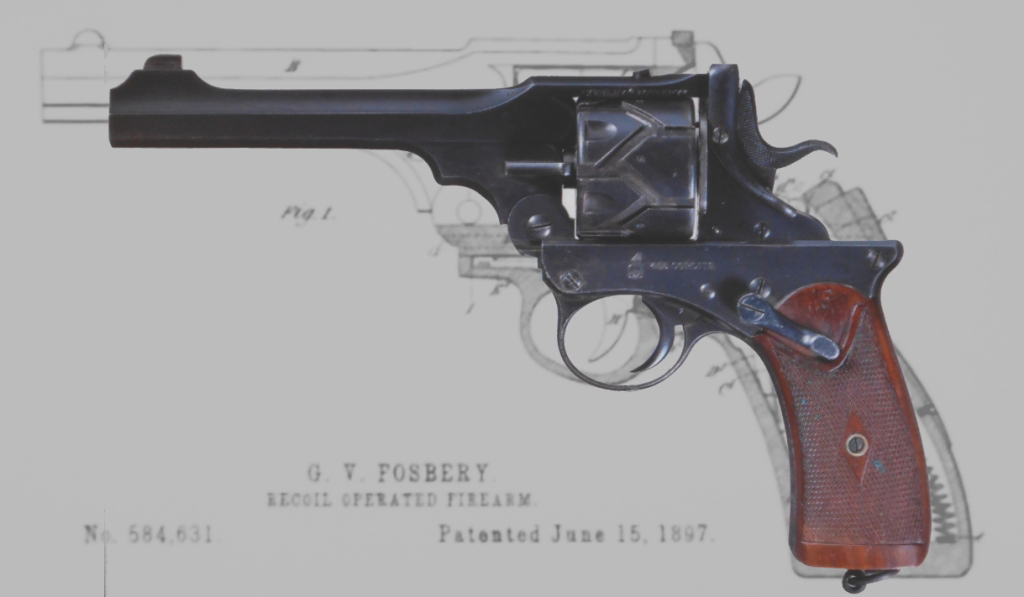
Webley-Fosbery Automatic Revolver

A highly unusual example of an "automatic revolver", the Webley-Fosbery Automatic Revolver was produced between 1900 and 1915, and available in both a six-shot .455 Webley version, and an eight-shot .38 ACP (not to be confused with .380 ACP) version. Unusually for a revolver, the Webley-Fosbery had a safety catch, and the light trigger pull and reputation for accuracy ensured that the Webley-Fosbery remained popular with target shooters long after production had finished.

== Users ==
- Australia
- Bangladesh
- Barbados
- British Empire
- Canada − Limited use of Mk VI revolvers during WWI. Primarily used by the Royal Canadian Mounted Police
- British Hong Kong
- British Raj
- Kingdom of Egypt
- Gambia
- India − .455 Webleys were used by police forces as late as 1988
- Imperial State of Iran
- Ireland
- Israel
- Jordan
- Kenya
- Malaysia
- Myanmar − Retired
- New Zealand
- Nigeria
- Pakistan − Some .455 Webleys were built locally
- Rhodesia
- Seychelles
- Shanghai Municipal Police
- Siam
- Sierra Leone
- Singapore
- Tanzania
- Uganda
- Union of South Africa
- United Arab Emirates − Used only in Abu Dhabi
- Zimbabwe
