= Smith & Wesson Model 10 =

Service revolver

Smith & Wesson Model 1899 Military & Police
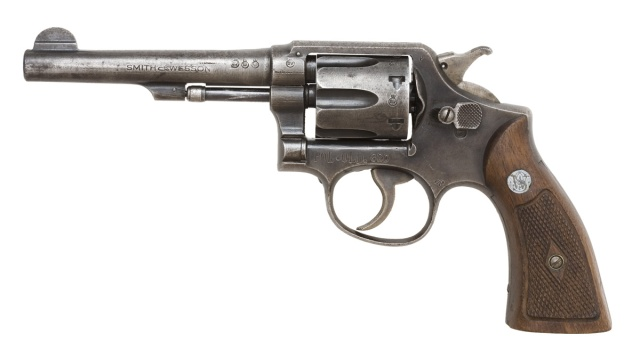
- Lend-Lease M&P dating from World War II, missing lanyard ring
- Type: Service revolver
- Place of origin: United States

Service history
- In service: 1899–present
- Used by: See Users
- Wars: World War I Easter Rising; Irish War of Independence; World War II; First Indochina War; Korean War; Vietnam War; Laotian Civil War; Cambodian Civil War; Bangladesh Liberation War; Gulf War; The Troubles; Lebanese Civil War; Portuguese Colonial War other conflicts

Production history
- Designed: 1899
- Manufacturer: Smith & Wesson
- Produced: 1899–present
- No. built: 6,000,000+
- Variants: 38 M&P; M&P Model 1902; Model of 1905; Victory Model; Model 10

Specifications
- Mass: ~ 34 ounces (960 g) with standard 4 in (100 mm) barrel (unloaded)
- Barrel length: 2 inches (51 mm); 2.5 inches (64 mm); 3 inches (76 mm); 4 inches (100 mm); 5 inches (130 mm); 6 inches (150 mm)
- Cartridge: .38 Long Colt.38 Special.38/200 (.38 S&W)
- Action: Double action
- Muzzle velocity: 1,000 feet per second (300 m/s) (.38 Special); 685 feet per second (209 m/s) (.38/200)
- Feed system: 6-round cylinder
- Sights: Blade front sight, notched rear sight

The Smith & Wesson Model 10, previously known as the Smith & Wesson .38 Hand Ejector Model of 1899, the Smith & Wesson Military & Police or the Smith & Wesson Victory Model, is a K-frame (that is, medium-sized) revolver. In production since 1899, the Model 10 is a six-shot, .38 Special, double-action revolver with fixed sights. Over its production run it has been available with barrel lengths of 2 in (51 mm), 3 in (76 mm), 4 in (100 mm), 5 in (130 mm), and 6 in (150 mm). Barrels of 2.5 inches (64 mm) are also known to have been made for special contracts. Over 6,000,000 of the type have been produced over the years, making it the most-produced handgun of the 20th century.

== History ==
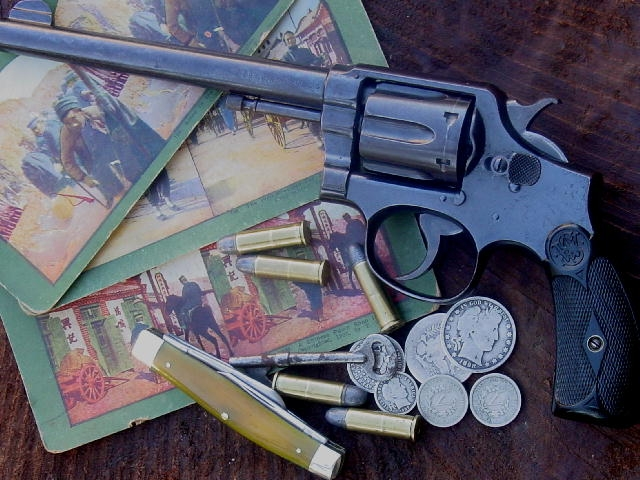
The first Model M&P of 1899, six-inch barrel. The ejector rod is free-standing, without the under-barrel latch of later models

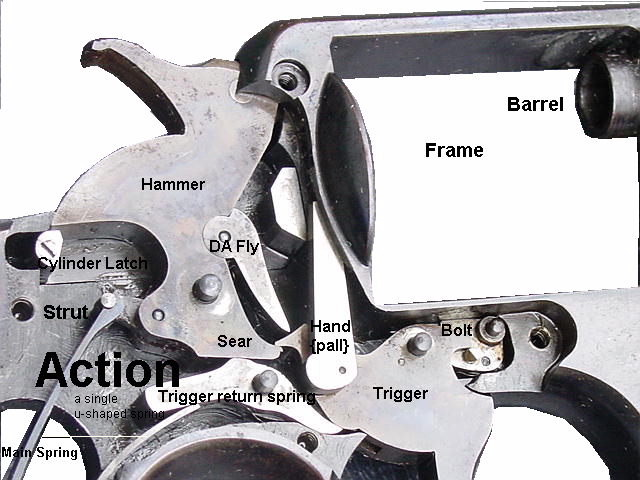
The lockwork of the first model differed substantially from subsequent versions. The trigger return spring is a flat leaf rather than the coil spring-powered slide used in variations dating from 1905 onwards.

In 1899, the United States Army and Navy placed orders with Smith & Wesson for two to three thousand Model 1899 Hand Ejector revolvers chambered for the M1892 .38 Long Colt U.S. Service Cartridge. With this order, the Hand Ejector Model became known as the .38 Military and Police model. That same year, in response to reports from military sources serving in the Philippines on the relative ineffectiveness of the new cartridge, Smith & Wesson began offering the Military & Police in a new chambering, .38 S&W Special (a.k.a. .38 Special), a slightly elongated version of the .38 Long Colt cartridge with greater bullet weight (158 grains) and powder charge increased from 18 to 21 grains of gunpowder.

In 1902, the .38 Military & Police (2nd Model) was introduced and featured substantial changes. These included major modification and simplification of the internal lockwork and the addition of a locking underlug on the barrel to engage the previously free-standing ejector rod. Barrel lengths were 4-, 5-, 6-, and 6.5-inches with a rounded butt. Serial numbers for the Military & Police ranged from number 1 in the series to 20,975. Most of the early M&P revolvers chambered in .38 Special appear to have been sold to the civilian market. By 1904, S&W was offering the .38 M&P with a rounded or square butt, and 4-, 5-, and 6.5-inch barrels.

=== World War I ===
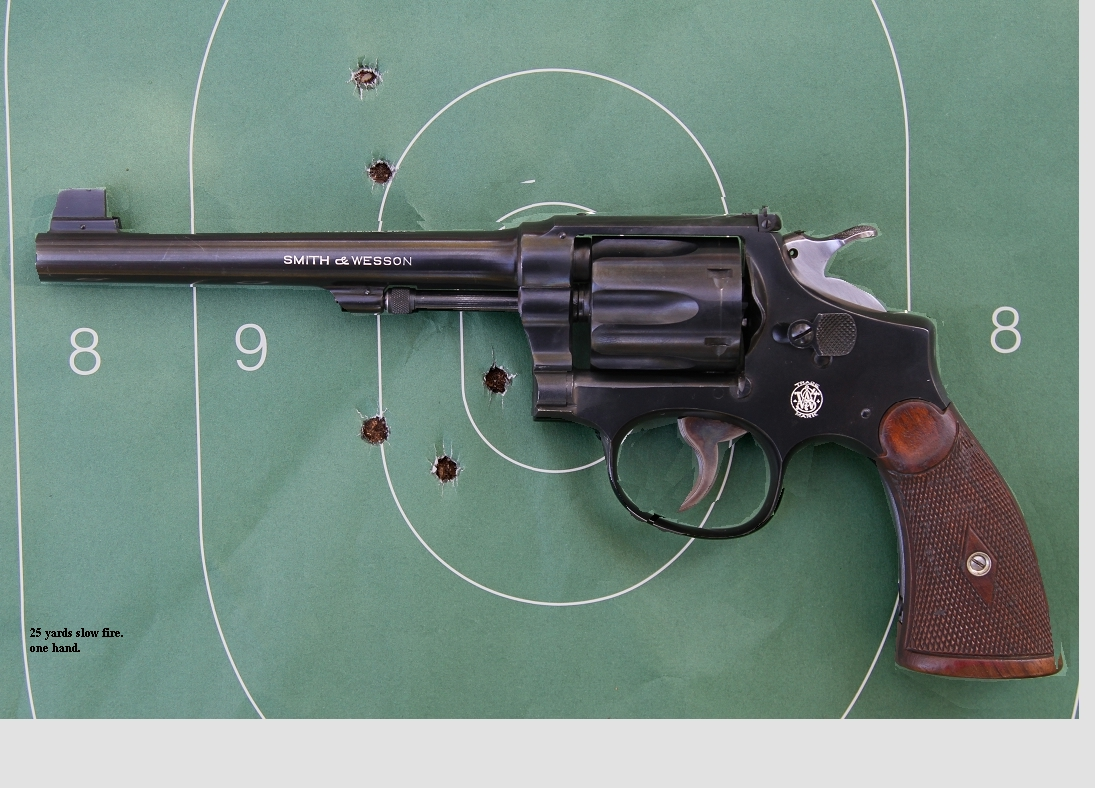
Smith & Wesson 1905 4th change 1915 Target model. "NRA" Slow Fire at 25 yards. The hammer was added later and is in the general form of the King Gun Shop modification usually intended for the timed and rapid-fire portions of the NRA course.

The .38 S&W Military & Police Model of 1905 4th Change, introduced 1915, incorporated a passive hammer block and enlarged service sights that quickly became a standard across the service revolver segment of the industry.

After the War, the M&P would become the standard issue police sidearm for the next 70 years. It would also become very popular with civilian shooters, with several new models being made, including the first snubnosed 2-, 2.5- and 3-inch barrel models being made in 1936.

=== World War II ===
The S&W M&P military revolvers produced from 1942 to 1944 had serial numbers with a "V" prefix, and were known as the "Smith & Wesson Victory Model". Early Victory Models did not always have the V prefix.

Initial production of 65,000 4-inch-barreled revolvers for Navy aircrew bypassed standard procurement procedures, and quality suffered without traditional inspection procedures.

Quality improved when Army ordnance inspectors became involved in early 1942, and the design was modified in 1945 to include an improved hammer block after a sailor was killed by a loaded revolver discharging when accidentally dropped onto a steel deck.

Some Lend-Lease Victory Model revolvers originally chambered for the British .38/200 were returned to the United States and rechambered to fire the more popular and more powerful .38 Special ammunition, and such revolvers are usually so marked on their barrels. Rechambering of .38-200 cylinders to .38 Special results in oversized chambers, which may cause problems.

The finish on Victory Models was typically a sandblasted and parkerized finish, which is noticeably different from the higher-quality blue or nickel/chrome finishes usually found on commercial M&P/Model 10 revolvers.

Other distinguishing features of the Victory Model revolver are the lanyard loop at the bottom of the grip frame, and the use of smooth (rather than checkered) walnut grip panels. However, some early models did use a checkered grip, most notably the pre-1942 manufacture.

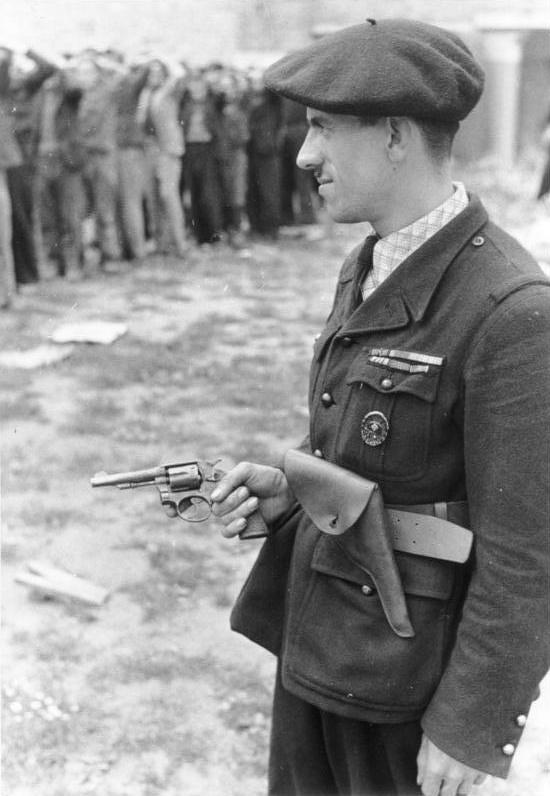
The "92 espagnol", a Spanish-made copy of Smith & Wesson's M&P as used by the French Milice during World War II and chambered in 8mm French Ordnance.

=== Model 10 ===
After World War II, Smith & Wesson returned to manufacturing the M&P series.

Along with cosmetic changes and the replacement of the frame fitting grip with the Magna stocks, the spring-loaded hammer block safety gave way to a cam-actuated hammer block that rode in a channel in the side plate (Smith 1968).

In the late 1950s, Smith & Wesson adopted the convention of using numeric designations to distinguish their various models of handguns, and the M&P was renamed the Model 10.

The M&P/Model 10 has been available in both blued steel finish and nickel finish for most of its production run. The model has also been offered throughout the years with both the round butt and square butt grip patterns.

Beginning with the Model 10–6 series in the early 1960s, the tapered barrel and its trademark 'half moon' front sight (as shown in the illustrations on this page) were replaced by a straight bull barrel and a sloped milled ramp front sight.

Late model Model 10s are capable of handling any .38 Special cartridge produced today up to and including +P+ rounds.

As of 2012 the Model 10 was available only in a 4-inch barrel model, as was its stainless steel (Inox) counterpart, the Smith & Wesson Model 64. Some 6,000,000 M&P revolvers have been produced over the years, making it the most popular handgun of the 20th century.

== Variants ==
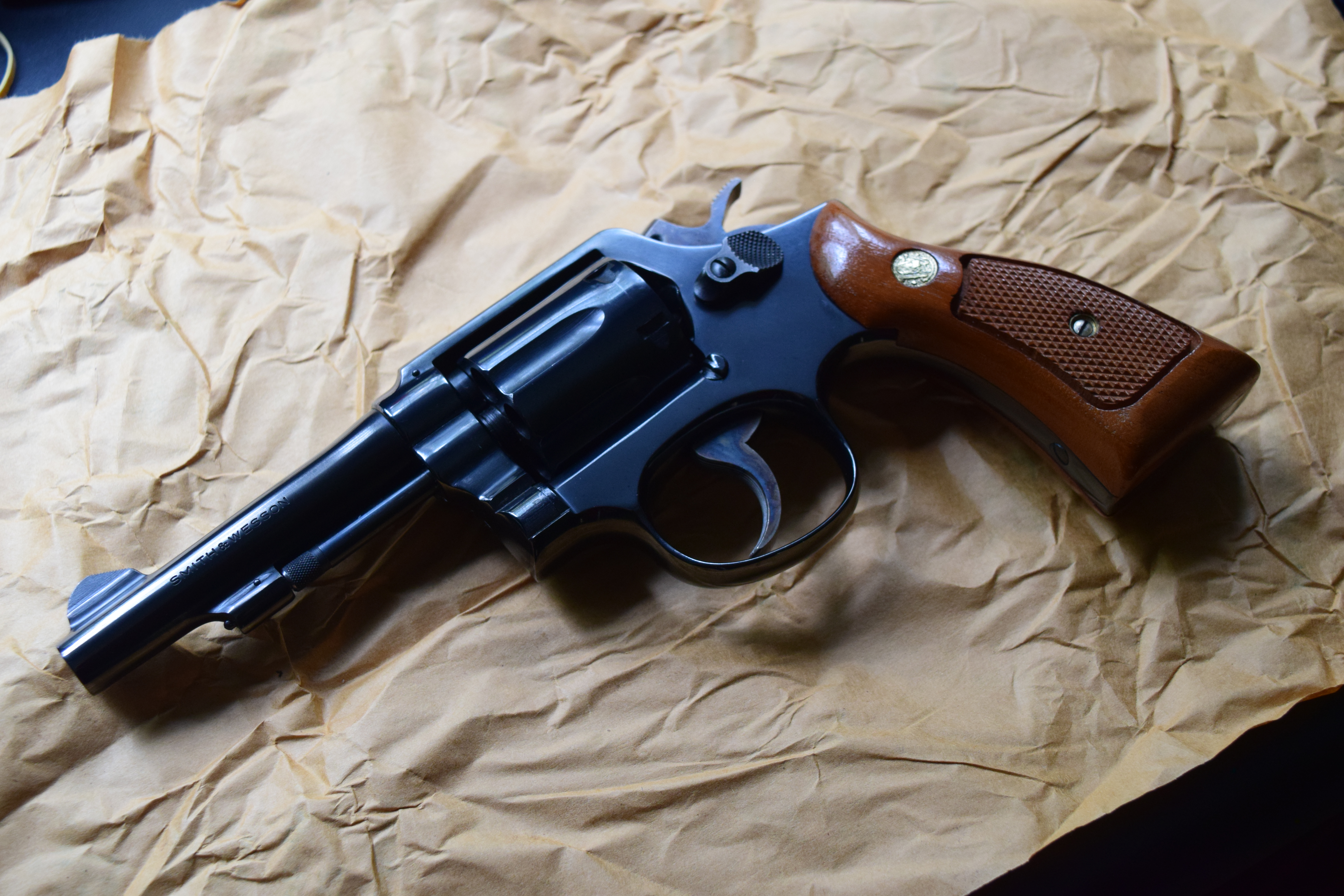
Smith and Wesson Model 10-5

Smith and Wesson Model 10-6

Table of modifications
Model	Year	Modifications
10	1957	Introduction
10-1	1959	Heavy barrel introduced
10-2	1961	Change extractor rod thread for standard barrel
10-3	1961	Change extractor rod thread for heavy barrel, change front sight width from 1/10" to 1/8"
10-4	1962	Eliminate trigger-guard screw on standard barrel frame
10-5	1962	Change sight width from 1/10" to 1/8" on standard barrel
10-6	1962	Eliminate trigger-guard screw on heavy-barrel frame
10-7	1977	Change gas ring from yoke to cylinder for standard barrel
10-8	1977	Change gas ring from yoke to cylinder for heavy barrel
10-9	1988	Replace yoke retention system, radius stud package, floating hand hammer nose bushing for standard barrel
10-10	1988	Replace yoke retention system, radius stud package, floating hand hammer nose bushing for heavy barrel
10-11	1997	MIM hammer/trigger and floating firing pin for standard barrel and HB heavy barrel Model M10 Park police model.
10-12	1997	MIM hammer/trigger + floating firing pin for heavy barrel
10-13	2002	Limited production 1899 commemorative edition
10-14	2002	Internal lock added
10-14	2010	Discontinued
10-14	2012	Reintroduced as part of the Classic Line
10-15	2025	Removed internal lock

=== .357 Magnum variations ===
After a small prototype run of Model 10-6 revolvers in .357 Magnum caliber, Smith & Wesson introduced the Model 13 heavy barrel in carbon steel and then the Model 65 in stainless steel.

Both revolvers featured varying barrel weights and lengths—generally three and four inches with and without underlugs (shrouds). Production dates began in 1974 for the Model 13 and ended upon discontinuation in 1999.

The Model 65 was in production from 1972 to 1999. Both the blued and stainless models were popular with police and FBI, and a variation of the Model 65 was marketed in the Lady Smith line from 1992 to 1999.

=== .38 S&W variations ===
From the late 1940s to early 1960s Smith & Wesson made a Variation of the Model 10 chambered for .38 S&W called the Model 11 that was sent to British Commonwealth countries to supply their armies and police forces.

=== Clones ===
During the First World War, copies (slightly undersized) of the Military & Police were produced in Eibar and Guernica (Spain), in 8mm 1892 caliber for the French armies.

A few copies of Smith & Wesson Model 10 were produced in Israel by Israel Military Industries (IMI) as the Revolver IMI 9mm. The weapon was chambered in the 9mm Luger caliber, instead of .38 Special, the original caliber.

Also, Norinco of China has manufactured the NP50, which is a copy of the Smith & Wesson Model 64, since 2000.

== Usage ==
=== Warfare ===
==== WWI ====
The M&P revolver was issued in large numbers during World War I, where it proved itself to be a highly reliable and accurate weapon. Although WWI saw the rise of semi-automatic pistols, revolvers such as the M&P were used in vast numbers as semi-automatic handgun production at the time wasn't sufficient to meet the demand.

==== WWII ====
During World War II, 590,305 Victory Model revolvers were supplied to the United Kingdom, Canada, Australia, New Zealand, and South Africa under the Lend-Lease program, chambered in the British .38/200 caliber already in use in the Enfield No 2 Mk I Revolver and the Webley Mk IV Revolver.

Most Victory Models sent to Britain were fitted with 4-inch or 5-inch barrels, although a few early versions had 6-inch barrels. The 5-inch barrel was standard production after 4 April 1942. The Office of Strategic Services (OSS) supplied thousands of these revolvers to resistance forces. Thousands of Victory Model revolvers remained in United States Army inventories following World War II for arming foreign military and security personnel.

An additional 352,315 Victory Model revolvers chambered in the .38 Special cartridge were used by United States forces during World War II. The Victory Model was a standard-issue sidearm for United States Navy and Marine Corps aircrews and was also used by security guards at factories and defense installations throughout the United States during the war.

Although the latter personnel could use conventional lead bullets, Remington Arms manufactured REM UMC 38 SPL headstamped cartridges loaded with a 158 gr (10.2 g) full metal jacket bullet for military use in overseas combat zones. Tracer ammunition was manufactured for signaling purposes.

Many aircrews preferred to carry the revolver rather than the heavier M1911 pistol. Pilots often preferred a shoulder holster in the confined space of a cockpit, but a hip holster was also available for security personnel.

==== Post-WWII ====
Some of these revolvers remained in service well into the 1990s with units of the United States Armed Forces, including the United States Air Force and the Coast Guard.

Until the introduction of the Beretta M9 9mm pistol in 1990, U.S. Army helicopter crew members and female military police were equipped with .38 caliber Victory Model revolvers. Five hundred revolvers with two-inch barrels were delivered on 22 August 1944 for Criminal Investigation Division agents.

The Victory Model remained in use with Air National Guard tanker and transport crews as late as Operation Desert Storm in 1991, and with United States Navy security personnel until 1995.

=== Law enforcement ===
S&W Military & Police revolvers were provided to reorganized police forces, such as the Austrian Police, during the occupation after World War II.

The S&W Model 10 revolver was a popular weapon before the semi-automatic pistol replaced the revolver in many police departments, as well as police units and armies. The Hong Kong Police used the S&W Model 10 as standard issue until 2024 when it was announced they were switching to Chinese made semi-automatic pistols on the grounds of S&W no longer manufacturing the revolver for export to Hong Kong, a lack of replacement parts and due to the grips on the new guns allegedly fitting Asian hands better.

=== Criminal activities ===
Lee Harvey Oswald used a Victory Model to murder J. D. Tippit shortly after assassinating President John F. Kennedy. It was found in his possession when he was apprehended on November 22, 1963.

== Users ==
- Algeria
- Costa Rica
- Iran
- Israel
- Jamaica
- Jordan
- Libya
- Nicaragua
- Pakistan
- Peru
- Philippines
- Saudi Arabia
- Vietnam
- Thailand

=== Former users ===
- Australia
  - Law enforcement in Australia
    - Replaced by multiple different semi-automatic pistols between 1990 and 2010
- Bangladesh
  - Formerly used in Bangladesh Liberation War
- China
- Canada
  - Law enforcement in Canada
- France
- Pahlavi Iran
- British Hong Kong
  - Royal Hong Kong Police
- Hong Kong
  - Hong Kong Police Force
    - To be phased out by the CF98-A since July 2024
  - Independent Commission Against Corruption
  - Correctional Services Department
  - Hong Kong Customs and Excise Department
  - Hong Kong Auxiliary Police Force
- Indonesia
  - US Military Assistance Program 1,332 in 1971 and 3,943 in 1972
- Ireland
  - Garda Síochána
    - Replaced by SIG Sauer P226 and Walther P99C
- Iceland
  - Icelandic Police
  - Icelandic Coast Guard
    - Replaced by the Glock 17
- Japan
  - Prefectural police headquarters
    - Since late 1940s
- Kingdom of Laos
  - Received from US Government during Laotian Civil War
- Latvia
- Macau
  - Public Security Police Force
  - Judiciary Police
  - Correctional Services Bureau
  - Macau Customs Service
  - Commission Against Corruption
- Malaysia
  - Royal Malaysia Police
    - Used alongside the Model 15
    - Replaced by the Beretta Px4 Storm and Walther P99
  - Police Volunteer Reserve
  - RELA Corps
    - Used alongside the Smith & Wesson Model 36 2-inch barrel
- New Zealand
  - New Zealand Police
  - Replaced by the Glock 17
- Norway
  - Home Guard
    - Until 1986, replaced by the Glock 17
  - Norwegian Police Service
    - From 1981 until 2008, being replaced by the Heckler & Koch P30
- Panama
  - Panama Defense Forces.
- Paraguay
  - Used during the Chaco War
- Portugal
  - Portuguese police
    - Replaced by the Walther PP, subsequently by the Glock 19
- Singapore
  - Singapore Police Force
    - Replaced by the Taurus Model 85 in 2002
- Union of South Africa
- South Korea
  - Korean National Police Agency
  - ROK Forces during the Korean War and Vietnam War
- South Vietnam
- Soviet Union
  - NKVD (Lend Lease)
  - Militsiya (Lend Lease)
  - Various security personnel (Lend Lease)
- Turkey
  - Emniyet Genel Müdürlüğü (Turkish National Police)
    - Used between 1951 and the mid-1990s
- United Kingdom
  - Formerly standard issue for Authorised Firearms Officers
    - Replaced by the Glock 17
- United States
  - United States Army
  - United States Marine Corps
    - Replaced by M1911A1 and M9
  - Law enforcement in the United States
    - Departments of Corrections

== See also ==
- Colt Official Police
- Enfield No. 2
- M1917 revolver
- Nagant M1895
- New Nambu M60
- Service pistol
- Webley Revolver
