= List of World War II infantry weapons =

This is a list of World War II infantry weapons.

== Kingdom of Albania ==
The Albanian Kingdom maintained a small military force that was heavily influenced by Italy. Following the Italian invasion of Albania in April 1939, Albania was incorporated into the Italian Empire as the Italian protectorate of Albania. Albanian military units were reorganized under Italian command and received mostly Italian-made weapons and equipment.

During the Greco-Italian War in 1940–1941, Albanian units participated as part of the Italian military effort against Greece. Albanian soldiers were mainly equipped with Italian small arms, including Carcano rifles, Beretta pistols, and Italian machine guns.

After the Armistice of Cassibile in 1943, Italian forces withdrew from Albania and German forces occupied the country during the German invasion of Albania. The Wehrmacht supplied some Albanian formations with German weapons, while the National Liberation Movement and Albanian partisans obtained weapons from Allied airdrops, captured Italian equipment, and captured German supplies.

=== Sidearms ===
- Glisenti Model 1910 – Italian service pistol supplied through Italian military channels and used by Albanian troops equipped by Italy.
- Beretta Model 1915 – Used by Italian-equipped Albanian military personnel and security units.
- Beretta M1934 – Standard Italian service pistol used by Italian forces and supplied to Albanian formations during the Italian occupation.
- Beretta M1935 – Used alongside the Beretta M1934 by Italian and Albanian personnel.
- Luger P08 – Used in limited numbers, mainly from German stocks and captured weapons.

=== Submachine guns ===
- Beretta M38 – Used by Italian forces and later by Albanian partisans through captured stocks.
- Beretta M1918 – Early Italian submachine gun used in limited numbers.
- Sten – Supplied to the LANÇ by Allied support programs and used by Albanian partisans.
- MP 40 – Used by German forces and German-equipped Albanian units, later captured by Albanian resistance groups.
- MP 41 – Used in limited numbers by German forces and resistance units.

=== Rifles ===
- Carcano M1891 – Main Italian rifle supplied to Albanian forces during the Italian occupation period.
- Carcano M38 – Used by Italian-equipped Albanian units during World War II.
- M1870 Italian Vetterli – Older Italian rifle supplied with Carcano rifles during the interwar period and retained in limited service.
- Mannlicher–Schönauer – Used in limited numbers by Albanian military forces before World War II.
- Mannlicher M1895 - Used by Albanian forces during the interwar period, limited use in World War II.
- Mauser M1893 – Used by Albanian forces before and during the interwar period.
- Karabiner 98k – Supplied by Germany and used by German-equipped Albanian units and the LANÇ.
- Mosin–Nagant – Used by Albanian partisan forces, obtained through Allied supply channels and captured stocks.

=== Machine guns ===
- Breda M30 – Italian light machine gun used by Italian-equipped Albanian units.
- Breda M37 – Italian medium machine gun used by Italian forces stationed in Albania.
- Fiat–Revelli Modello 1914 – Older Italian machine gun retained in limited service.
- Maxim gun – Used in limited numbers from older stocks.
- Schwarzlose MG M.07/12 – Former Austro-Hungarian machine gun that remained in Balkan service.
- MG 34 – German general-purpose machine gun used after the German occupation of Albania.

== Commonwealth of Australia ==
The Second Australian Imperial Force that served in Mediterranean and Middle East and Pacific theatre

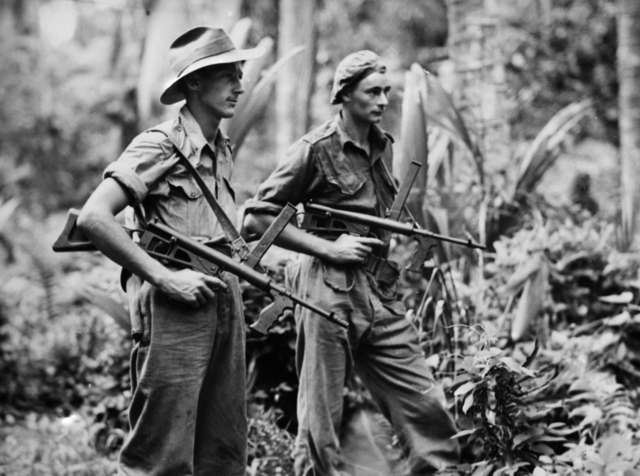
Two Australian soldiers equipped with Owen submachine guns

=== Sidearms ===
- Enfield No.2
- Smith & Wesson Victory
- Webley Mk.VI (.455 inch (11.5 mm))

=== Submachine guns ===
- Thompson M1928 & M1928A1
- Austen submachine gun (withdrawn from combat use in August 1944)
- Owen gun (adopted in September 1941. Standard issue SMG of the Australian army in Pacific Theatre)

=== Rifles ===
- Lee–Enfield No.1 Mk III* (standard issue rifle)
- Lee–Enfield No.1 Mk III* (HT) (sniper rifle)
- Pattern 1914 Enfield (used as sniper rifle)

=== Machine guns ===
- Lewis gun
- Bren light machine gun
- Vickers machine gun

=== Grenades ===
- No.36M Mk.I grenade
- No.69 Mk.I grenade (Concussion hand grenade. Australians made them of red bakelite)
- No.77 grenade (White phosphorus hand grenade)

=== Flamethrowers ===
- M2 flamethrower

=== Mortars ===
- Ordnance SBML 2-inch mortar
- Ordnance ML 3-inch mortar

=== Anti-tank weapons ===
- Boys anti-tank rifle
- PIAT

== Federal State of Austria ==
The Austrian Bundesheer was incorporated into the German Wehrmacht after the Anschluss in 1938.

=== Sidearms ===
- Steyr M1912
- Mauser C96
- Rast & Gasser M1898
- Roth-Steyr M1907

=== Submachine guns ===
- MP-34

=== Rifles ===
- Mannlicher M1895 rifle
- Mannlicher M95/30 short rifle

=== Machine guns ===
- Schwarzlose M.07/12
- Mg 30

=== Mortars ===
- 8cm M33 Minenwerfer

=== Grenades ===
- Rohrhandgranate
- Austrian Stielhandgranate

== Kingdom of Belgium ==
Before being conquered by Germany, the Belgian Army used their own equipment up to 1940. Free Belgian forces were equipped by UK, however colonial troops of Force Publique in East Africa had to use outdated weaponry.

=== Sidearms ===
- Browning Hi-Power (standard issue sidearm adopted in 1935)
- Browning FN M1910 and M1922
- Nagant M1895
- FN 1900

=== Submachine guns ===
- Mitraillette Modèle 1934 (MP 28/II produced under license at Pieper)
- Sten (used by Free Belgian forces)

=== Rifles ===
- Fusil Modèle 1935 (standard issue rifle intended to replace older Model 1889)
- Belgian Mauser Model 1889 & Model 1889/36 (Remained in service. Modernized Model 1889/36 is known as Fusil Modèle 1936)
- Belgian Mauser Model 1916 Carbine
- Mauser Gewehr 98 & Kar98 AZ (received from Germany after First World War as compensation)
- Lee–Enfield No.4 Mk I (used by Free Belgian forces)

=== Light machine guns ===
- Lewis machine gun
- FN Mle 1930 - Standard light machine gun adopted in 1930. Copy of Colt R75 (the Browning Automatic Rifle Model 1925 )
- MG 08/15
- Fusil-Mitrailleur 1915-27 (used by rear-line units)
- Bren light machine gun (used by Free Belgian forces)

=== Medium machine guns ===
- Hotchkiss M1914 (used by Chasseur Ardennais)
- Vickers machine gun

=== Heavy machine guns ===
- Browning M1917
- MG 08
- Colt-Browning 1895/14 (used by reserve)

=== Grenades ===
- Mills bomb

=== Mortars ===
- Lance-grenades de 50 mm D.B.T.
- Stokes Mortar (used by Force Publique)
- Two-inch mortar (used by Free Belgian forces)

=== Anti-tank weapons ===
- PIAT

== Third Brazilian Republic ==
The Brazilian Expeditionary Force, under US command, served in Italy from 1944.

=== Sidearms ===
- M1917 revolver
- Colt M1911
- P06 Luger (home front)
- MAS Mle 1892 (home front)

=== Submachine guns ===
- M3 submachine gun
- Thompson submachine gun
- MP-28 (home front)
- SIG M20 Bergmann (home front)
- Mauser C96 Schnellfeuer M713 including foreign copies (home front)

=== Rifles ===
- Springfield M1903 (standard issue rifle)
- M1 carbine
- M1 Garand (limited numbers)
- FN M1924 (home front)
- Vz. 24 (home front)
- Vz. 33 (home front)
- Mauser M1908 (home front)
- Mauser M1894 (home front)
- Mauser M1935 (home front) upgraded Mauser 1908

=== Light machine guns ===
- Browning M1918
- Madsen machine gun (home front)
- Hotchkiss M1922 (home front)
- Zb vz. 26 (home front)
- Hotchkiss M1909 Portative (home front)

=== Medium machine guns ===
- Browning M1919
- Hotchkiss M1914 (home front)

=== Heavy machine guns ===
- Browning M1917
- Browning M2
- MG 08 (home front)

=== Grenades ===
- Mk.2 fragmentation hand grenade
- BMB offensive grenade (home front)
- DMB defensive grenade (home front)
- Mills bomb (home front)

=== Anti-tank weapons ===
- M1 Bazooka

== Kingdom of Bulgaria ==
=== Sidearms ===
- Luger P08 pistol
- Walther PP
- Tokarev TT-33 (supplies from USSR 1944)

=== Submachine guns ===
- ZK-383
- Steyr MP34
- MP 40
- PPSh-41 (supplies from USSR 1944)
- PPS-43 (supplies from USSR 1944)

=== Rifles ===
- Steyr-Mannlicher M1895 (standard issue rifle)
- Mosin–Nagant M1891/30
- Mauser Karabiner 98k

=== Machine guns ===
- Maxim M1910 (supplies from USSR 1945)
- ZB vz. 26
- ZB vz. 30
- ZB vz. 53
- Madsen machine gun
- Schwarzlose M1907/12
- MG 08
- MG 30
- MG 34
- MG 42
- Chauchat
- ZB vz. 60
- DShK (supplies from USSR 1945)
- Degtyaryov DP-27 (supplies from USSR 1945)

=== Mortars ===
- Brandt M1927/31
- 8 cm Granatwerfer 34

=== Anti-tank weapons ===
- Solothurn S-18/100
- Panzerschreck
- Panzerfaust

=== Grenade launcher ===
- Schießbecher

=== Grenades ===
- Stielhandgranate M1924/1943
- Blendkörper 1H & 2H
- Nebelhandgranate 39
- Bulgarian Offensive/Defensive stick grenade (based on Stielhandgranate M1917

== State of Burma ==
The State of Burma was a puppet government set up by Japanese after they occupied Burma in 1942. It lasted from 1943 to March 1945 when the Burma National Army revolted and joined the allies.

=== Sidearms ===
- Nambu pistol
- Webley Revolver (captured)

=== Submachine guns ===
- Type 100 submachine gun
- M1 Thompson (captured)
- Sten (captured)

=== Rifles ===
- Arisaka Type 30
- Arisaka Type 38
- Lee-Enfield (captured)

=== Machine guns ===
- Bren light machine gun (captured)
- Lewis gun (captured)
- Vickers machine gun (captured)
- Type 3 heavy machine gun
- Type 11 light machine gun

== Dominion of Canada ==
Weaponry used by Canadian Army that fought on the side of the Allies

=== Sidearms ===
- Browning Hi-Power (Canada in 1944 produced Hi-Powers for China but later that year they developed a simplified version and adopted it as pistol No. 2)
- Enfield No.2 (approx. 3500 revolvers acquired, some issued to RCAF)
- Colt M1911 (approx. 4000 Colts acquired. Issued to Airborne troops from 1942)
- Smith & Wesson Military & Police (Main service sidearm during World War 2, many received from Lend-Lease)

=== Submachine guns ===
- Sten submachine gun (locally produced. Never used in Mediterranean theatre)
- Thompson submachine gun (adopted after Fall of France)
- Lanchester submachine gun (used by Royal Canadian Navy)
- Reising M50

=== Rifles ===
- Lee–Enfield No.3 and No.4 Mk I (locally produced, standard issue rifle)
- Pattern 1914 Enfield (used for training and by secondary troops. Used by the snipers)
- M1 carbine (received 230 carbines from Lend-Lease. Limited use)
- M1 Garand (Garands were issued to certain Canadian Army units near the end of World War II)
- Ross rifle (used for training up to 1943)
- Enfield M1917 (used for training)

=== Machine guns ===
- Bren machine gun (standard issue LMG)
- Lewis machine gun (used for training and as anti-aircraft weapon)
- Johnson M1941 machine gun (used by First Special Service Force)
- Vickers machine gun

=== Grenades ===
During the Second World War Canada produced grenades types with Numbers 36 and from 67 to 89.

- No.36M grenade (also known as the "Mills bomb")
- No.68 anti-tank grenade (HEAT anti-tank rifle grenade)
- No.69 Mk.I grenade (Concussion hand grenade)
- No.73 anti-tank grenade (Also known as the "Thermos grenade")
- No.74 anti-tank hand grenade (Also known as the "Sticky bomb")
- No.75 anti-tank hand grenade (Also known as the "Hawkins grenade". Most common anti-tank grenade)
- No.76 special incendiary grenade (Phosphorus hand grenade)
- No.77 grenade (White phosphorus hand grenade)
- No.82 hand grenade (Also known as the "Gammon bomb")

=== Flamethrowers ===
- Flamethrower, Portable, No 2

=== Mortars ===
- SBML 2-inch mortar
- ML 3-inch mortar

=== Anti-tank weapons and explosives ===
- Boys anti tank rifle (locally produced)
- PIAT (Replaced Boys in 1943)
- Bangalore torpedo
- M1 Bazooka (Small amount received from Lend-Lease)

== Republic of China ==
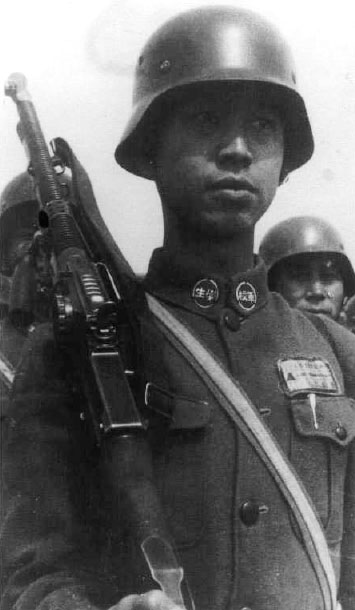
A Chinese Nationalist Army soldier equipped with a ZB vz. 26 and a German M1935 helmet. Before the war broke out, China sought support from, and often traded with Germany and relied on both military and economical support.

Weapons used by the National Revolutionary Army, as well as Communist forces and Chinese warlords. Chinese Forces also received a large amount of equipment from Lend-Lease during Burma campaign.

=== Edged weapons ===
- HY1935 bayonet
- Type 30 bayonet (captured)
- Qiang spear
- Dadao sword
- Miao dao sword

=== Sidearms ===
- Mauser C96 (.45 ACP variant included, locally produced)
  - Mauser M712 (Fully automatic variant)
- Astra 900
- Browning FN M1900 (Imported and locally produced)
- Browning FN M1922
- Colt M1903 Pocket Hammerless (issued to officers only)
- M1917 revolver (American Lend-Lease)
- Browning Hi-Power (limited numbers in the Burma campaign X-Forces and Y-Forces)
- Colt M1911A1 (American Lend-Lease)
- Nambu Type 14 (captured)
- Type 26 revolver (captured)

=== Submachine guns ===
- SIG M1920 (locally produced copy with a downward facing magazine called the "Flower Mouth Machine-gun," or 花机关)
- Steyr MP34
- Thompson submachine gun (American Lend-Lease and local production)
- United Defense M42 (American Lend-Lease and local production)
- Sten submachine gun (received Canadian Mk II Stens)
- Sichuan type submachine gun

=== Rifles ===
- Hanyang Type 88 (Licensed copy of the Gewehr 1888, standard issue rifle)
- Type 24 rifle (Licensed copy of the Mauser Model 1924, also known as the Chiang Kai-shek rifle)
- Mauser Karabiner 98k (Mainly issued to the early German trained divisions)
- FN Model 24 and Model 30
- Vz. 24 (Also used with grenade launcher)
- Carcano M1891
- Mosin–Nagant M1891 and M1891/30 (received as aid from Soviet Union)
- Type 1 rifle
- Gewehr 98
- Vz. 98/22
- Arisaka rifle (captured and locally produced copies)
- ZH-29
- Enfield M1917 (American Lend-Lease)
- Springfield M1903 (American Lend-Lease)
- M1 Carbine (Very small quantity received from OSS)
- Lee–Enfield No.4 Mk I (American Lend-Lease, used in training in Burma)
- Xiangying rifle

=== Light machine guns ===
- ZB vz.26 (Imported from Czechoslovakia and locally produced)
- ZB vz.30 (Imported and locally produced)
- Browning FN M1930
- Browning wz. 1928
- Madsen machine gun
- SIG KE7
- Degtyaryov DP-27 (received as aid from Soviet Union)
- Maxim–Tokarev (supplied by the Soviet Union between 1938 and 1939 under the Sino-Soviet Aid Program)
- Hotchkiss M1922
- Lewis machine gun
- Lahti-Saloranta M/26 (Very limited numbers)
- Bren machine gun (Both in .303 and 7.92 Mauser)
- Type 11 light machine gun (captured)
- Type 96 light machine gun (captured)

=== Medium machine guns ===
- Hotchkiss M1914
- ZB-53
- Browning M1919 (American Lend-Lease in Burma)

=== Heavy machine guns ===
- Type 24 machine gun (locally produced copy of MG 08 in 7.92 caliber)
- Type 30 (locally produced copy of Browning M1917 in 7.92 caliber, also known as Type Triple-Ten. Also received from Lend-Lease)
- PM M1910
- Type 3 heavy machine gun (captured)
- Type 92 heavy machine gun (captured)

=== Grenades and grenade dischargers ===
- Chinese Stielhandgranate
- Type 23 grenade
- Type 28 grenade launcher (Attached on Hanyang 88 or Mauser type rifle)
- Type 89 grenade discharger (captured)

=== Flamethrowers ===
- M1A1 flamethrower (American Lend-Lease in Burma campaign)

=== Mortars ===
- Brandt Mle 27/31 (imported from France and Austria. Locally produced copies designated as Type 20)
- M2 mortar (American Lend-Lease and locally produced as Type 31)

=== Anti-tank weapons ===
- Boys anti tank rifle
- M1 Bazooka
- Explosive belt (Improvised)

== National Government of the Republic of China ==
Weapons used by the Collaborationist Chinese Army from 1940 to 1945

=== Sidearms ===
- C96 Mauser

=== Submachine guns ===
- SIG Bergmann M1920

=== Rifles ===
- Type 24 Zhongzheng rifle
- Hanyang 88
- Carcano
- Arisaka Type 38
- Arisaka Type 99
- Vz.24 rifle

=== Machine guns ===
- ZB vz.26
- Type 11 LMG
- Type 96 LMG
- Type 99 LMG
- Type 3 HMG
- Type 92 HMG

== Independent State of Croatia ==
Independent State of Croatia was a puppet-state established in 1941 after fall of Yugoslavia. Croatian Legion and Light Transport Brigade served on Eastern Front under German and Italian commands.

=== Edged weapons ===
- Kampfmesser 42 (Bayonet)
- Seitengewehr 98 (Bayonet)
- Srbosjek
- Srbomlat

=== Sidearms ===
- Luger pistol
- Nagant M1895
- M1910/22
- Walther P38 (Supplied by Germany)

=== Submachine guns ===
- Suomi KP/-31
- Erma EMP-35
- Steyr MP34
- MP 40
- PPSh-41 (captured)

=== Automatic rifles ===
- Sturmgewehr 44

=== Rifles ===
- Berthier rifle
- Carcano rifle
- vz. 24
- Mauser Karabiner 98k (used in large numbers by both Ustaše Militia and Croatian Home Guard)
- Mannlicher M1895
- Lebel Model 1886 rifle
- M1924

=== Machine guns ===
- Chauchat
- Fiat-Revelli M1914
- MG 34
- MG 42
- Lewis gun
- PM M1910
- M26
- M37
- M1909
- Hotchkiss M1914
- MG 35-36A

=== Grenades ===
- Nebelhandgranate 39
- M1924 Stielhandgranate

=== Mortars ===
- Stokes mortar (81 mm)
- Brandt M1927/31 (81 mm)
- 8 cm Granatwerfer 34
- 12 cm Granatwerfer 42

=== Anti-tank weapons ===
- Panzerschreck
- Panzerfaust

== First Czechoslovak Republic ==
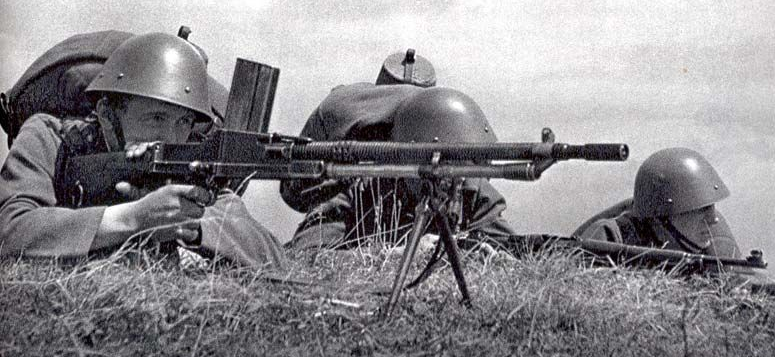
Czechoslovak soldiers with a ZB vz. 26 and a ZB vz. 24

Weaponry used by Czechoslovak armies in exile that served under British and Soviet commands. For weapons used and produced in interwar period by First and Second Czechoslovak Republic see list below.

=== Sidearms ===
- ČZ vz. 38 (Interwar)
- Pistole vz. 22 (Interwar)
- Pistole vz. 24 (Interwar)

=== Submachine guns ===
- Sten submachine gun (Under British command)
- PPSh-41 (Under Soviet command)
- PPS (Under Soviet command)

=== Rifles ===
- vz. 24 (Interwar)
- Lee–Enfield rifle (Under British command)
- Mosin–Nagant (Under Soviet command)
- SVT-40 (Under Soviet command)

=== Machine guns ===
- ZB vz. 26 (Interwar)
- ZB vz. 30 (Interwar)
- ZB-53 (Interwar as Těžký kulomet vz. 35 & vz. 37)
- Bren machine gun (Under British command)
- Vickers machine gun (Under British command)
- DP-27 (Under Soviet command)
- Maxim M1910 (Under Soviet command)

=== Anti-tank weapons ===
- PIAT (Under British command)
- PTRD-41 (Under Soviet command)
- PTRS-41 (Under Soviet command)

=== Grenades ===
- Granát vz.34 (Interwar)
- RPG-43 (Under Soviet command)

=== Mortars ===
- 50-PM-40 (Under Soviet command)
- 82-PM-41 (Under Soviet command)

== Kingdom of Denmark ==
=== Sidearms ===
- Smith & Wesson Model 10
- Danish M1880/85 Army revolver
- Bergmann–Bayard M1910/21 (standard issue)
- FN 1910/22 (Danish police)
- Danish revolver M1865/97 (reserve)

=== Submachine guns ===
- BMP-32 (police)
- Sten submachine gun (used by the Danish resistance movement)
- Lettet-Forsøgs submachine gun

=== Shotguns ===
- Sjögren shotgun (limited numbers)

=== Rifles ===
- Krag–Jørgensen M1889 (standard issue rifle)
- Lee–Enfield rifle
- Mauser Karabiner 98k (Danish resistance)
- Swedish Mauser M96 (Danish Brigade)
- Automatgevar M42 (Danish Brigade)

=== Machine guns ===
- Browning M1919
- M29 medium machine gun (Heavy barrel version of the standard M24)
- Madsen Lmg 24 machine gun

=== Grenades ===
- Granatbaeger M/23 51mm (rifle grenade attachment)
- M1937 smoke grenade
- M1932 smoke grenade
- M1923 grenade
- M1923 rifle grenade

=== Mortars ===
- Danish Brandt 27/31 81mm L/21

== Republic of Estonia ==
In 1940, Estonia was annexed by the Soviet Union and thus its army absorbed into the Red Army. When Germany launched its attack on the USSR, many Estonians joined the fight as many as 20'000 volunteers as SS soldiers.

=== Sidearms ===
- Nagant 1895
- FN M1903
- Browning Hi-Power
- Walther P38 (Estonian SS volunteers)
- P08 Luger (Estonian SS volunteers)
- TT-33 Tokarev (Estonian Red Army)

=== Machine guns ===
- Madsen M1920
- Lewis gun
- PM M1910
- MG-42 (Estonian SS volunteers)

=== Rifles ===
- Mosin M1935
- Mosin M1891/33
- Mosin M1891/38
- Mosin M1891
- Mosin-Nagant 1891/30 (Estonian Red Army)
- Mosin-Nagant 1938 Carbine (Estonian Red Army)
- Mosin-Nagant 1944 carbine (Estonian Red Army)
- Kar98k (Estonian SS volunteers)
- P14 Enfield
- Arisaka Type 38 (Kaitseliit)
- Arisaka Type 30 (Kaitseliit)

=== Submachine guns ===
- Suomi KP-31
- MP-40 (Estonian SS volunteers)
- SIG M1920 Bergmann

=== Anti-tank guns ===
- Solothurn S18/100

=== Mortars ===
- 81mm Brandt Mle 27/31 M1926 Tampella

=== Grenades ===
- Estonian Stielhandgranate

=== Mines ===
- TM-34
- TM-37

== Ethiopian Empire ==
Ethiopian Empire was defeated by Italy in Second Italo-Ethiopian War and became Italian Ethiopia from 1937. Ethiopians continued a guerrilla war as the Arbegnoch until British forces took Italian Ethiopia in 1941 as part of the East African campaign

=== Sidearms ===
- Beretta M1934 (captured)
- FN Model 1910
- Mauser C96 (Kebur Zabugna)

=== Submachine guns ===
- Beretta Model 38 (captured)
- Bergmann MP35
- Haenal MP 28
- Steyr MP34

=== Rifles ===
- Beretta M1918
- Carcano (captured)
- FN M1924 and M1930
- Mannlicher M1895
- Mauser Standardmodell
- Mosin–Nagant rifle
- M1870 Italian Vetterli (captured)
- ZH-29

=== Machine guns ===
- Breda 30 (captured)
- FN M1930 D
- ZB vz. 26
- SIG KE7

== Republic of Finland ==
Weaponry used by Finnish Defence Forces during Winter War, Continuation War and Lapland War.

=== Edged weapons ===
- Puukko knife

=== Sidearms ===
- Luger pistol (The most common sidearm used by front-line troops. 8,000 acquired in the 1920s)
- Lahti L-35 (adopted in 1935. Approx. 5700 produced by 1945)
- Pistole vz. 24 (3,285 bought from Germany, they arrived in September 1940. Issued mainly to Finnish front-line troops during Continuation War)
- Pistole vz. 38 (About 1,700 bought from Germany, they arrived in September 1940. These pistols were issued to Finnish front-line troops for Continuation War)
- Browning Hi-Power (2,400 bought from Belgium in February - March 1940. Finnish frontline troops used some during the last weeks of Winter War and in larger scale during Continuation War. Also issued in large numbers to Finnish pilots during Continuation War.)
- Ruby pistol (About 10,000 bought from France in 1919. The first pistol model acquired for Finnish Army. Mainly used in Finnish home front during World War 2, but also few frontline units got these pistols issued.)
- Browning FN M1910 (2,500 pistols bought from Belgium in February 1940. During Continuation War they were issued to home front troops.)
- Browning FN M1922 (2,500 pistols were bought from Belgium in February 1940 and issued to both Finnish home front troops and frontline troops during Continuation War.)
- Beretta M1934 (About 1,400 - 1,500 bought from Italy. Besides 60 pistols acquired during Winter War they arrived in year 1943. Finnish home front troops used them between 1943 - 1944.)
- Beretta M1935 (About 4,100 bought from Italy. About 1,000 arrived in 1941 and 3,090 arrived in 1942. Finnish frontline and home front troops used them 1941 - 1944.)
- Beretta M1915 and M1915/19 (Some 1,500 pistols bought from Italy in spring of 1940. They were issued to Finnish home front troops and supplies units for Continuation War.)
- Browning FN M1903 (used by Swedish Volunteer Force during Winter War. Leftover pistols were issued to front-line troops during Continuation War.)
- Mauser C96 (614 examples, most of them issued with wooded stock-holster. Used by home-front troops)
- Nagant M1895 (captured)
- Tokarev TT-33 (captured)
- Colt M1911 (Very limited numbers)

=== Submachine guns ===
- Suomi KP/-31 (Main Finnish submachine gun. Finnish army received 56,847 submachine guns in 1939–1944)
- SIG Bergmann M/20 (approx. 1500 were bought in interwar period. Initially used by Civil Guard but they were issued to infantry at the beginning of Winter War. Remained in service until 1944.)
- Lindelöf submachine gun (SIG Bergmann copy; manufactured in very small numbers)
- Neuhausen MKMS (282 SMGs bough during Winter War. Issued to Finnish home front troops, supplies units and coastal defence during Continuation War)
- MP 28 (171 SMGs bought during Winter War. During Continuation War issued to units in Lapland, home front troops and supply corps.)
- MP 38 & MP 40 (150-160 SMGs delivered with German vehicles during Continuation War, mainly used by vehicle crews of these delivered vehicles)
- PPD-34, PPD-34/38 & PPD-40 (captured. Issued to Finnish coastal troops and home-front troops during Continuation War)
- PPSh-41 (Some 2,500 captured 1942–1944. Only used by Finnish frontline-troops until running out of ammo and only small numbers of PPSh-41 were used by Finnish home front troops in 1942–1944)
- PPS-43 (only used by Finnish frontline troops in 1943-1944 that had captured the guns)

=== Rifles ===
- Mosin–Nagant M/91, M/91-24, M/24, M/27, M/28, M/28-30, M/39, M/91-30, M/38, M/44 (Various rifles, cavalry rifles and carbines including Finish and Soviet variants. The most common model in Finnish service was M/91)
- SVT-38, SVT-40 (captured)
- Swedish Mauser M96 (Also known as Carl Gustav M/96. Used by Swedish volunteer troops and some Finnish units.)
- Mauser Karabiner 98k (600 of them ordered from Germany with grenade launchers, with only 100 of them getting to troops in Finland.)
- Arisaka Type 30, Type 35 & Type 38 (limited use by home front troops, civil guard and merchant navy.)
- Berdan II (Due to rifle shortage during Winter War they were still issued to home front. No real frontline usage.)
- Carcano M38 (Designated as 7,35 mm Rifle M/38 "Terni". Issued mostly to non-frontline troops such as field artillery and air-defence)
- Winchester M1895 (Mainly issued to second line artillery units and home guard units, no real frontline usage.)

=== Automatic and battle rifles ===
- AVS-36 (captured)
- AVT-40 (captured)
- Fedorov M1916 Avtomat (captured)

=== Light Machine guns ===
- Lahti-Saloranta M/26 (Main Finnish machine gun of the Winter War and Continuation War, replaced by captured DP-27s.)
- Degtyaryov DP-27 (captured and used as a replacement for the Lahti-Saloranta M/26, also captured DT-29 tank machine guns were used as replacement machine guns for Finnish tanks. Finland captured 8,400 DPs during Winter War and Continuation War)
- Kg m/21 (During Winter War used by Swedish-Norwegian volunteers and Finnish troops stationed in Lapland. During Continuation War used by Coastal Troops.)
- FN 1930 D (Finland bought 700 of these light machine guns from Belgium in February 1940. They were not issued during Winter War. Issued to fortification and coastal troops during Continuation War)
- Chauchat M1915 (5000 Machine guns donated by France. They were not issued during Winter War as arrived in January–February 1940. Mostly issued to Finnish home front units, field artillery and some shortly equipped infantry units during early Continuation War.)
- Lewis machine gun (Small number used on aircraft and as anti-aircraft machine gun)

=== Heavy Machine guns ===
- Maxim M1910 (Large numbers captured from the Soviets during World War 2. During World War 2 these machineguns were issued to troops of Finnish Army in very large numbers for variety of roles.)
- Maxim M/09-21 (Finnish modification of Soviet Maxim M1910. Issued mostly to Finnish frontline troops)
- Finnish Maxim M32-33 (issued mostly to Finnish frontline troops)
- DS-39 (During Continuation War issued to Finnish frontline troops. Less than 200 captured in 1941)
- M/14 Schwarzlose (used by Swedish volunteer unit during Winter War and some Finnish units until early 1944 during Continuation War. Total number in Finnish use about 70 guns)
- MG 08 (About 1,000 guns used by Finnish coastal troops during Continuation War. During late Continuation War relatively small number was also issued to fortification units.)
- Vickers machine gun (About 100 machine guns used by coastal troops and home front units)
- Goryunov SG-43 (captured)

=== Grenades ===
- Munakäsikranaatti 32 (Most common Finnish grenade)
- Munakranaatti M41
- Sirpalekranaatti M41 & M41/43
- Varsikranaatti M32 & M41
- Molotov fire grenade
- Kasapanos (Satchel charge)
- 36M Vécsey (Ordered 300000 grenades from Hungary)
- Fusante No.1 (Ordered in large quantities from France)
- OF1 (Ordered in large quantities from France)
- No. 36M Mk I Mills Bomb (Ordered 50000 grenades from Britain)
- M1924 Stielhandgranate (received approx. 500000 grenades from Germany in September 1941)
- Eihandgranate 39 (received approx. 150000 grenades from Germany in August 1944)
- M1914/30 (captured during Winter War)
- RGD-33 (captured)
- F-1 grenade (captured)

=== Flamethrowers ===
- Liekinheitin M/44
- Lanciafiamme M1935
- ROKS-3 (captured from Russian troops)

=== Anti-tank weapons ===
- Boys anti-tank rifle (British Boys anti-tank rifle used as 14 mm Pst Kiv/37. 100 Received in January 1940 and another 100 after Winter War)
- Lahti L-39 (produced after Winter War)
- Solothurn S-18/100 (only 12 Solothurn S-18s in Finnish service.)
- Wz. 35 anti-tank rifle (30 guns bought from Hungary, designated as 8 mm pst kiv/38. Delivered after Winter War.)
- PTRD-41 (captured around late 1942 - mid 1944)
- PTRS-41 (captured around early 1943 - mid 1944)
- Panzerfaust (Delivered from Germany.)
- Panzerschreck (Delivered from Germany.)

== French Third Republic ==
Weaponry used by French Army up to 1940 and by French Liberation Army.

=== Edged weapons ===
- Couteau Poignard M1916 (standard issued combat knife of the French army)
- Coup Coup Machete (used by Senegalese Tirailleurs)
- Fairbairn–Sykes fighting knife (used by the French Resistance, Free French Forces Commandos).

=== Sidearms ===
- SACM M1935A (approx. 10 000 pistols produced before occupation, announced as a standard issue sidearm of the French army in 1939, after the surrender of French(German took over the SACM company) in the early of the WW2 the French army switch back to issued the Spain Ruby pistol)
- Star M1914 (Officer sidearm)
- MAB Model D (Police sidearm)
- MAS M1873 (Police sidearm. Some of the reissued due to lack of weapons)
- MAS M1892 (Officer sidearm)
- Ruby pistol (standard issue sidearm)
- Smith & Wesson Model 10

=== Submachine guns ===
- MAS M1938 (Standard-issued SMG of the French army. Production began in April 1940. Approx. 2000 SMGs produced before occupation)
- Erma EMP-35 (Seized from surrendering Republicans after the Spanish civil war)
- Thompson submachine gun (France ordered 3000 Thompsons due to shortages of SMGs during invasion. Used by French Liberation Army)
- MP 18 (Some were in inventory in 1939. Limited use)
- Suomi K/P-31 (150 SMGs seized from surrendering Republicans after the Spanish civil war)
- Sten submachine gun (British aid)

=== Rifles ===
- MAS M1936 (standard issue rifle of the French army, adopted in 1936 by France and intended to replace the Berthier and Lebel series of service rifles)
- Berthier Mle 1892, Mle 1892 M16, Mle 1902, Mle 1907/15, Mle 1907/15 M16, Mle 1907/15 M34 (The most numerous series of carbines and rifles in French service. Some of them converted to 7,5mm cartridge)
- Lebel M1886/93 (Remained in use until the end of World War II. Mainly used by reservists and for launching VB grenades and as sniper rifle)
- RSC M1917 and M1918
- Enfield M1917 (used by French Liberation Army)
- Springfield M1903 (used by French Liberation Army, less common than M1917 Enfield. Also used as sniper rifle)
- M1 Carbine (used by French Liberation Army)
- M1 Garand (used by French Liberation Army)
- Lee–Enfield No.4 Mk I (used by French Liberation Army)

=== Machine guns ===
- MAC M1924/1929 light machine gun(standard issue light machine gun of the French army)
- Hotchkiss M1914 heavy machine gun(Main fire support weapon of the French army)
- Chauchat M1915 (Some remained in use. Replaced by FM 24/29)
- Hotchkiss M1922 (used by some colonial troops in Lebanon and French Indochina)
- MAC M1931 type C & E (used in vehicles and as stationary gun)
- Browning M1918 (French Liberation Army)
- Browning M1919 (French Liberation Army)
- Lewis machine gun
- Bren machine gun

=== Grenades ===
- F1 M1915 grenade (standard issue grenade of the French army)
- O.F. grenade
- Grenade incendiaire et fumigène automatique (Modèle 1916) (Smoke / Incendiary grenade)
- Grenade incendiaire à main. (Modèle 1916.) (Incendiary grenade)
- Mle 1937 offensive
- Mle 1937 defensive
- Tromblon VB grenade launcher

=== Mortars ===
- Brandt 60.7 mm M1935
- Brandt 81 mm M1927/31
- Lance Grenades 50 mm M1937

=== Anti-tank weapons ===
- M1 Bazooka (French Liberation Army)
- PIAT
- Boys anti-tank rifle

== German Reich ==
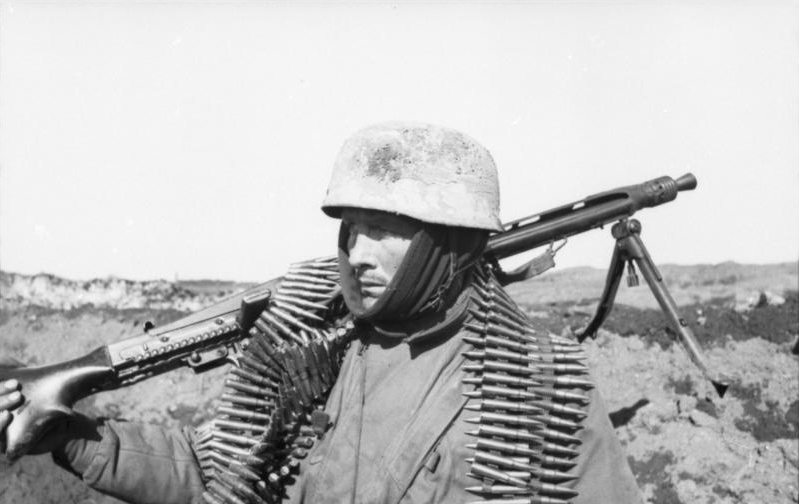
German paratrooper carrying a MG 42

In addition to the weapons listed here, German armed forces also used a wide variety of weapons captured from defeated enemies.

=== Edged weapons ===
- Seitengewehr 84/98 III (Bayonet of the K98 rifle, standard issued melee weapons of the German army)
- Kampfmesser 42 (Combat knife)
- Seitengewehr 98 (Bayonet of the G98 rifle)

=== Sidearms ===
- Walther P38 (Replacement for Luger P-08, completely overtook Luger production by 1942. And became the standard-issued pistol of the German army)
- Luger P-08 (Original standard-issue military pistol, was intended to be replaced by the Walther P-38 as it was cheaper to produce, the P08 however was still produced until 1942 because of production movement to different factories.)
- Mauser C96 (Rarer than the Luger P-08. Not officially distributed)
  - M1932/M712 Schnellfeuer (Fully automatic variant, issued to the Waffen-SS with a wooden stock-holster. Not officially distributed)
- Mauser HSC (issued to Kriegsmarine and Luftwaffe)
- Sauer 38H (used by police and officers)
- Walther PP and PPK (German police standard-issued sidearms. Privately purchased by officers)
- Astra 300
- Astra 400
- Astra 600
- Astra 900
- Beretta M1934 (Designated as "Pistole 671(i)")
- Colt M1911A1 (captured and designated as "Pistole 660(a)")
- FÉG 37M Pistol (Designated as "Pistole 37(u)")
- Star Model B

==== Foreign weapons produced under occupation ====
- Pistole 12(ö) (Steyr M1912 pistol)
- Pistole 24(t) (Pistole vz. 24)
- Pistole 27(t) (ČZ vz. 27)
- Pistole 39(t) (ČZ vz. 38)
- Pistole 625(f) (SACM M1935A) (approx. 24000 pistols produced under occupation, issued to occupation police)
- Pistole 640(b) (Browning Hi-Power) (issued to Waffen-SS and Luftwaffe)
- Pistole 641(b) (FN M1910/22)
- Pistole 645(p) / P35(p) (FB Vis)
- Pistole 657(n) (Kongsberg Colt) (issued to AOK Norwegen and Navy)

=== Submachine guns ===
- MP 38/MP 40 (Standard-issued SMG of the German army)
- MP 28 (used by police and occupation forces)
- Erma EMP-35 (Mainly issued to Waffen-SS and police. In early war issued to reserve troops to fill shortages of MP38)
- Bergmann MP35 (issued to police units and Waffen-SS)
- MP41 (Combination of an MP-28 stock and the rest of an MP-40. Used by Waffen-SS and police)
- MP 3008 (Also known as Volks-MP.3008, Gerät Neumünster and Gerät Potsdam. Copies of the Sten, used by the Volkssturm)
- Suomi KP/-31 - Finnish produced weapon bought from Finland, some captured from other countries.
- PPD-40 (captured from Soviets as "MP 715(r)")
- PPSh-41 (captured from Soviets as "MP 717(r)". Some of them were rebarreled for 9×19mm Parabellum and designated as "MP-41(r)")

Foreign weapons produced under occupation

- MP 34(ö) (Austrian Steyr-Solothurn S1-100. Adopted by Wehrmacht and Waffen-SS)
- MAS-38 (Designated as "MP 722(f)" issued to local militia and occupying forces)
- Beretta Model 38A & 38/42 (Designated as "MP 738(i)" & "MP 739(i)")
- ZK-383

=== Automatic rifles ===
- StG 44 (Assault rifle)
- FG 42 (Battle rifle, issued to Fallschirmjäger units in small numbers and very few given to SS troops because of supply issues and miscommunication.)

=== Rifles ===
- Karabiner 98k (Standard-issued rifle of the German army)
  - Karabiner 98b
- Gewehr 98/40 (Modification of Hungarian 35M rifle converted to 7.92mm. Ordered from Hungary due to shortages of rifles)
- Gewehr/Karabiner 43(Gewehr 43 was the early production name and Karabiner 43 was the later production name. Semi-Auto rifle with 10-feed magazine. Made by Walther)
  - Gewehr 41
- Volkssturmgewehr (Low cost weapons used to arm the Volkssturm in 1945)
- Mauser Model 1889
- GRC Gewehr 88 Obsolete, used by Volkssturm
- Mauser Gewehr 98 Obsolete, used by Volkssturm
- Winchester M1895 Obsolete, used by Volkssturm
- Lebel Model 1886 rifle Obsolete, used by Volkssturm
- Mosin–Nagant M1891/30 (captured from Soviets and designated as "Gewehr 254(r)". Issued due to shortage of rifles in 1944)
- Carcano M91/41 (Designated as "Gewehr 210(i)". Issued due to shortage of rifles in 1944)
- Berthier rifle (captured from France and designated as "Karabiner 551(f)". Issued due to shortage of rifles in 1944)
- Krag-Jørgensen (captured from Denmark and designated as "Gewehr 311(d)". Issued due to shortage of rifles in 1944)

==== Foreign weapons produced under occupation ====
- Gewehr 24(t) (vz. 24)
- Gewehr 29/40(ö) and Gewehr 29(p) (captured and modified versions of Karabinek wz. 1929. Mainly issued to Luftwaffe and Waffen-SS)
- Gewehr 33/40(t) (Modified version of vz. 33. Mainly used by Gebirgsjäger troops)
- Gewehr 211(n) (Krag-Jørgensen)

=== Sniper rifles ===
- Kar98k (Scoped with ZF39, ZF41, ZF42 and ZF4 optics)
- Karabiner 43 (Scoped with ZF4 Optics)
- Gewehr 98 (Scoped)

=== Machine guns ===
- MG 13 Light machine gun (Fairly limited usage by early war second-line troops, used by the Volkssturm, main machine gun of the Pzkpfw I light tank and used as a ground anti-aircraft weapon. Replaced by the MG 34. Still used until the end of the war)
- MG 34 General-purpose machine gun (Main fire support weapon of the German army until partially superseded by the MG 42. Remained in use, especially mounted on vehicles, until the end of the war due to flaws with the MG42.)
- MG 42 General-purpose machine gun (Going to be the main fire support weapon of the German army after 1942–1943 after replacing MG 34, but not very successfully to replace the MG34 to be the main fire support weapon of the German army, because it was unable to be mounted in any vehicle and high recoil. It was mostly installed on a tripod to use it as a trench defensive weapon)
- Bergmann MG 15nA machine gun used by volkssturm
- MG 08 & MG 08/15 (limited use)
- MG 30 (captured from Austria. Limited use by mountain troops. Never adopted by Wehrmacht)
- MG 35-36A "Knorr-Bremse" (limited usage by Waffen-SS from 1943)
- Browning wz. 1928 (captured from Poland and designated as "MG 28(p)")
- Breda M30 (used by Afrika Korps. Designated as "MG 099(i)")
- Breda M37 (Seized from Italians after Armsitice and used on Italian front. Designated as "MG 259(i)")
- Mitrailleur M.20 (captured from Netherland, designated as "MG 100(h)")
- Schwarzlose M7/12 & M7/24 (captured examples after annexation of Austria and Czechoslovakia)

==== Foreign weapons produced under occupation ====
- Maschinengewehr MG 26(t) (ZB vz.26 Mainly used by Waffen-SS)
- Maschinengewehr MG 30(t) (ZB vz. 30)
- MG37(t) (ZB-53)
- Schweres Maschinengewehr 258(d) (Madsen machine gun)

=== Grenades and grenade launchers ===
- M1924 Stielhandgranate (Stick grenade, standard issued hand grenade of the German army)
- M1939 Eierhandgranate (The most common German Grenade)
- M1943 Stielhandgranate (Stick grenade)
- Splitterring & Splittermantel (Fragmentation ring for the M1924 Stielhandgranate, M1943 Stielhandgranate and Eihandgranate 39)
- Shaving Stick Grenade
- Volkshandgranate 45 (Concrete grenade used in the last year of the war)
- Blendkörper 1H (Smoke grenade)
- Blendkörper 2H (Smoke grenade)
- Nebelhandgranate 39 (Smoke grenade)
- Nebelhandgranate 41 (Smoke grenade)
- NebelEihandgranate 42 (Smoke grenade)
- Nebelkerze 39 (Smoke candle)
- Brandflasche (German Molotov cocktail)
- Geballte Ladung (Improvised Satchel charge made of Stick grenades)
- Panzehandmine (Sticky anti-tank grenade)
- PanzerHandmine 3 (Magnetic anti-tank charge)
- Hafthohlladung (Also known as Panzerknacker. Magnetic anti-tank charge)
- Panzerwurfmine (anti-tank grenade used by Luftwaffe ground troops)
- Schiessbecher (Rifle grenade launcher attached on Mauser Karabiner 98k)
  - Gewehr-Granatpatrone 40 (Rifle grenade)
  - Gewehr-Sprenggranate (Rifle Grenade)
  - Gewehr-Panzergranate (anti-tank Rifle Grenade)
  - Gross Gewehr-Panzergranate (anti-tank Rifle Grenade)
  - Gross Panzergranate 46 & 61 (anti-tank Rifle Grenade)
- Sturmpistole (Modified Flare pistol into multi-purpose grenade launcher)
  - Panzerwurfkörper 42 (anti-tank grenade for Sturmpistole)
  - Wurfgranate Patrone 326 (Grenade for Sturmpistole)
  - Wurfkörper 361 (Grenade for Sturmpistole)

=== Flamethrowers ===
- Flammenwerfer 35
- Flammenwerfer 41
- Einstossflammenwerfer 46, single shot, disposable flamethrower

=== Mortars ===
- 5 cm leicht Granatwerfer 36
- 8 cm Granatwerfer 34
- 8 cm kurz Granatwerfer 42
- 12 cm Granatwerfer 42

=== Anti-tank weapons ===
- Panzerbüchse 38 and Panzerbüchse 39
  - Granatbüchse GrB-39 (Modified version of the Panzerbüchse 39)
- Schwere Panzerbüchse 41 (Heavy anti-tank rifle)
- Panzerfaust (Disposable AT weapon, cannot be reloaded, first serviced in 1943)
- Panzerschreck (approximately 290,000 produced, first serviced in 1944)
- Model SS41 (Czech design. Used by SS troops mainly on Eastern front in early stages of war.)
- PTRD-41 (captured from Soviets and designated as "Panzerabwehrbüchse 783(r)")
- PTRS-41 (captured from Soviets and designated as "Selbstlade-Panzerabwehrbüchse 784(r)")
- Wz. 35 anti-tank rifle (captured from Poland and designated as "Panzerbüchse 35(p)". Used in early years of war on Western front. Then transferred to Italians in 1941)

=== Anti-aircraft rocket launcher ===
- Fliegerfaust (Prototypes/trials only)

=== Guided explosive weapons ===
- Leichtes Ladungsträger Sd.Kfz.302 "Goliath" (Electrical engined remote controlled explosive machine)
- Leichtes Ladungsträger Sd.Kfz.303A and B "Goliath" (Petrol engined remote controlled explosive machine)

=== Miscellaneous guns ===
- M30 Luftwaffe Drilling(This weapon featured two side-by-side 12 gauge shotgun barrels on top and a 9.3x74mmR rifle barrel below, A survival weapon issued to Luftwaffe pilots during World War II)

== Kingdom of Greece ==
Weaponry used by Hellenic Army during World War II. After World War I Greece received a large quantities of French weaponry. After fall of Greece elements of the Greek Armed Forces that managed to escape to the British-controlled Middle East formed Greek Armed Forces in the Middle East, these forces were reequipped by UK. Partisans and resistance movement used weapons from various sources but mainly used captured Italian and German weapons from Greco-Italian War and German invasion of Greece, they were also supplied by UK and OSS.

=== Edged weapons ===
- Y:1903 Bayonet

=== Sidearms ===
- Browning FN M1910/22
- Colt M1927 Official Police
- Nagant M1895
- Ruby M1914
- Steyr M1912
- Webley revolver
- Beretta M1934 (captured from the Italians)
- Luger pistol (captured from the Germans)
- Walther P38 (captured from the Germans)

=== Submachine guns ===
- Steyr MP34 (used by gendarmerie and police forces)
- Thompson M1928 and M1A1 (used by Greek Armed Forces in the Middle East)
- Sten submachine gun (used by partisans)
- United Defense M42 (used by partisans. Received from OSS)
- Beretta M1938 (captured from the Italians)
- MP 40 & MP 41 (captured from the Germans)

=== Rifles ===
- Mannlicher-Schönauer M1903, M1903/14, M1903/27 and M1903/30 (standard issue rifle)
- Mauser FN M1930 (Bought between 1930 and 1939 to supplement the lack of rifles in interwar period)
- Mannlicher M1895 (used by reserve units and for training)
- Berthier M1892, M1892/16, M1907/15 and M1916 (received in large quantities from France after WWI)
- Lebel M1886/93 (received in large quantities from France after WWI, mainly used with VB Grenade launcher)
- Gras M1874 and M1874/14 (used by reserve units, police and partisans)
- Lee-Enfield No.1 Mk III* (used by Greek Armed Forces in the Middle East)
- Carcano rifle (captured from the Italians, main partisan rifle)
- Kar98k (captured from the Germans)
- Vz.24 (captured from the Germans)

=== Light machine guns ===
- Hotchkiss Μ1922/26 (Standard light machine gun)
- Hotchkiss M1909 Benét–Mercié machine gun (Remained in service after World War I)
- Chauchat M1915 (Remained in service after World War I)
- EPK M1939 (Prototype only)
- Bren machine gun (used by Greek Armed Forces in the Middle East, replaced Lewis Gun)
- Lewis machine gun (used by Greek Armed Forces in the Middle East)
- Breda M1930 (captured from the Italians)
- MG 34 (captured from the Germans)
- MG 42 (captured from the Germans)
- ZB vz. 26 (captured from the Germans)

=== Medium machine guns ===
- Hotchkiss M1914
- Hotchkiss modified machine gun
- Saint Étienne M1907/16

=== Heavy machine guns ===
- Schwarzlose M1907/12 (limited use)

=== Grenades ===
- Churnat (used by partisans)
- VB rifle grenade

=== Mortars ===
- Brandt M1927/31
- Brixia M1935 (captured from the Italians)

=== Anti-tank weapons ===
- Boys anti-tank rifle (Ordered 1786 rifles, 122 reached Greece)
- PIAT (used by Greek Armed Forces in the Middle East)

== Kingdom of Hungary ==
Weaponry used by Royal Hungarian Army that fought on the side of the Axis powers

=== Edged Weapons ===
- 1890/1931.M Bayonet
- 1935.M bayonet

=== Sidearms ===
- Pisztoly 19M (Also known as Frommer Stop. Remained in service until 1945)
- FÉG 29M
- FÉG 37M Pistol
- Roth Steyr M.7 (Some still in inventory by 1939)
- Rast and Gasser 1898
- Frommer Lilliput
- Walther P38 (Supplied by Germany. Limited use)

=== Submachine gun ===
- Danuvia 39M and 43M
- Steyr MP34
- Bergmann MP35
- MP40
- SIG MKMS (very limited)
- PPSH 41 (captured)

=== Rifles ===
- 31M rifle (Replaced by 35M Rifle as standard issue. Also known as M95/31)
- 35M rifle (standard issue rifle)
- 43M rifle (Modification of 35M rifle converted to 7.92mm cartridge. Also known as G98/40)
- Mannlicher 88/90
- „Mauser 1895“ reported in 1940 inventory, likely just unconverted M95 Mannlichers and Mauser rifles for training
- K98k scoped
- Berthier (used by police and militia)
- SVT 40 (captured)

=== Machine guns ===
- Madsen machine gun (Madsen golyószóró M.24. Reissued in 1943, mostly with anti-aircraft mounts)
- Solothurn 31M & 43M light machine guns
- Chauchat (issued to police)
- 34M Stange (MG 34 supplied by Germany)
- 42M Grunov (MG 42 supplied by Germany)
- Schwarzlose M1907/31M heavy machine gun

=== Grenades ===
- 31M Vesiczky
- 36M Vécsey
- 37M Demeter
- 39A/M (Molotov fire grenade)
- 42M Vecsey (issued to soldiers in 1944)
- 43 M. vakító kézigránát (Smoke grenade)
- M1924 & M1943 Stielhandgranate (Supplied by Germany)
- Eihandgranate Model 39 (Supplied by Germany)
- Schiessbecher (German grenade launcher mounted on 43M Rifle)

=== Mortars ===
- 5 cm Granatwerfer 36 (Supplied by Germany)
- 39 M. 5 cm gránátvető (5 cm 39.M grenade launcher)
- 36 M. és 36/39 M. 8 cm aknavető (Hungarian 81 mm 36.M & 36/39M medium mortars)
- 43 M. 12cm aknavető (Hungarian 120 mm 43.M mortar based on captured Soviet M1943 Mortar)

=== Anti-tank weapons ===
- Solothurn 36M 20mm anti-tank rifle (S-18/100) (introduced in 1936 and produced under license up to 1943. Also used in armored vehicles)
- 43M & 44M kézi páncéltörő vető (Hungarian hybrid of bazooka and panzerschreck)
- Faustpatrone & Panzerfaust 30 (Supplied by Germany in 1944. Also known as Kis Páncélököl and Nagy Páncélököl)
- Panzerschreck (Supplied by Germany)

== British Raj ==
The British Indian Army under UK command.

=== Sidearms ===
- Colt M1911
- FN Model 1910
- Smith & Wesson Victory
- Webley Revolver

=== Submachine guns ===
- Sten
- Thompson submachine gun

=== Rifles ===
- Lee–Enfield No.1 Mk III* (standard issue rifle)
- Pattern 1914 Enfield

=== Machine guns ===
- Bren light machine gun
- Lewis gun
- Vickers machine gun
- Vickers-Berthier

=== Grenades ===
- Mills bomb

== Imperial State of Iran ==
Weapons used by Imperial State of Iran during Anglo-Soviet invasion of Iran in 1941

=== Sidearms ===
- Browning 1910
- Luger pistol
- Mauser C96
- Modèle 1892 revolver
- Webley Revolver
- Walther PP

=== Submachine guns ===
- MP 28 (Some MP 28 were purchased before World War Two)

=== Rifles ===
- Iranian Mauser 98/29 (standard issue rifle)
- Iranian Mauser 98/29 carbine
- vz. 24

=== Machine guns ===
- Lewis gun
- Maxim gun
- Vickers machine gun
- ZB vz. 26 (6000 ZB-26 received in 1934)
- ZB vz. 30 (produced under license)
- ZB-53

== Kingdom of Iraq ==
Weapons used by Kingdom of Iraq during Anglo-Iraqi War in 1941

=== Sidearms ===
- Beretta M1934
- Luger P08
- Mauser C96
- Webley Revolver

=== Rifles ===
- Karabiner 98k
- SMLE Mk III* (standard issue rifle)
- P14 Enfield

=== Machine guns ===
- Chauchat
- Lewis gun
- Maxim gun
- Vickers machine gun
- Bren machine gun

== Kingdom of Italy ==
Weaponry of Royal Italian Army up to 1943 and National Republican Army from 1943.

=== Edged weapons ===
- M1891 sciabola baionetta (sword bayonet)
- M1891/38 pugnale baionetta (Dagger bayonet)
- M1939 pugnale (Dagger)

=== Sidearms ===
- Beretta M1934 (standard issue sidearm adopted in 1935)
- Beretta M1923
- Beretta M1935 (issued to Regia Marina and Regia Aeronautica)
- Bodeo M1889 (Remained in service of both armies until the end of the war. Issued to officers)
- Glisenti M1910 (used by Carabinieri, cavalry and rear-line units)
- Roth–Steyr M1907 (received as reparations after World War I. Some of them were reissued to republican forces in final years of war due to shortages of sidearms)
- Steyr M1912(limited)
- Mauser C96
- Walther P38 (Supplied by Germany. Limited use)

=== Submachine guns ===
- Beretta M1938A & M1938/42 (Beretta M1938A is the standard issue SMG of the Italian army)
- FNAB-43 (used by Italian Social Republic)
- TZ-45 (Last ditch weapon issued by the end of war to Republican forces)
- OVP 1918 (limited use)
- Thompson M1A1 (captured examples used by the Italian Army prior to 8 September 1943)

=== Rifles ===
- Carcano M1891, M1891/1924, M1891/1938, M1938 and M1891/1941 (standard issue rifles and carbines including cavalry and "per Truppe Speciali" variants, M1891/1941 is the standard issue rifle of the Italian army)
- M1870/87 and M1870/87/15 Vetterli-Vitali (used by second-line troops in North Africa and colonial troops in Italian East Africa. Used in both 10,35mm and 6,5mm)
- Steyr-Mannlicher M1895 (received as reparations after World War 1. Used by colonial and second-line troops in Africa)
- Armaguerra Mod. 39 rifle (limited use)
- ZH-29 (captured from Ethiopia)
- Revelli-Beretta M1915 (Semi-automatic carbine erroneously called as submachine gun)
- Beretta M1918/30 (Semi-automatic carbine erroneously called as submachine gun)
- Mauser Karabiner 98k (used as sniper rifle. After armistice used by Italian Social Republic)
- Gewehr 41 (used by Italian Social Republic)

=== Light machine guns ===
- Breda M1930 (standard issue LMG, adopted in 1930)
- MG 42 (used by Italian Social Republic)

=== Medium machine guns ===
- Breda M1938 (Tank machine gun adapted for infantry use)
- Breda Mod. 5C
- Fiat–Revelli M1914 (used by colonial troops in Italian East Africa)
- Fiat–Revelli M1935 (Fully replaced Fiat–Revelli M1914 in 1940)
- Schwarzlose 07/12

=== Heavy machine guns ===
- Breda M1937 (Standard HMG adopted in 1937, main fire support weapon of the Italian army)

=== Grenades ===
- Breda M1935
- Breda M1942
- OTO L
- OTO M1935
- OTO M1942
- Passaglia grenade
- SRCM M1935

=== Flamethrowers ===
- Lanciafiamme M1935 (Mainly used on Eastern Front)
- Lanciafiamme Modello 40
- Lanciafiamme Mod. 41 d'assalto

=== Mortars ===
- Brixia 45/5 M1935
- CEMSA 81/14 M1935

=== Anti-tank weapons ===
- Boys anti-tank rifle (captured in the North African campaign)
- Kb ppanc wz.35 (Ex-Polish)
- Solothurn S-18/1000
- Solothurn S-18/1100
- Panzerfaust 30 (used by Italian Social Republic)
- Panzerschreck (used by Italian Social Republic)

== Japanese Empire ==
Weaponry used by Imperial Japanese Armed Forces during World War II. Japan officially joined the conflict in 1941 but was still involved in Second Sino-Japanese War.

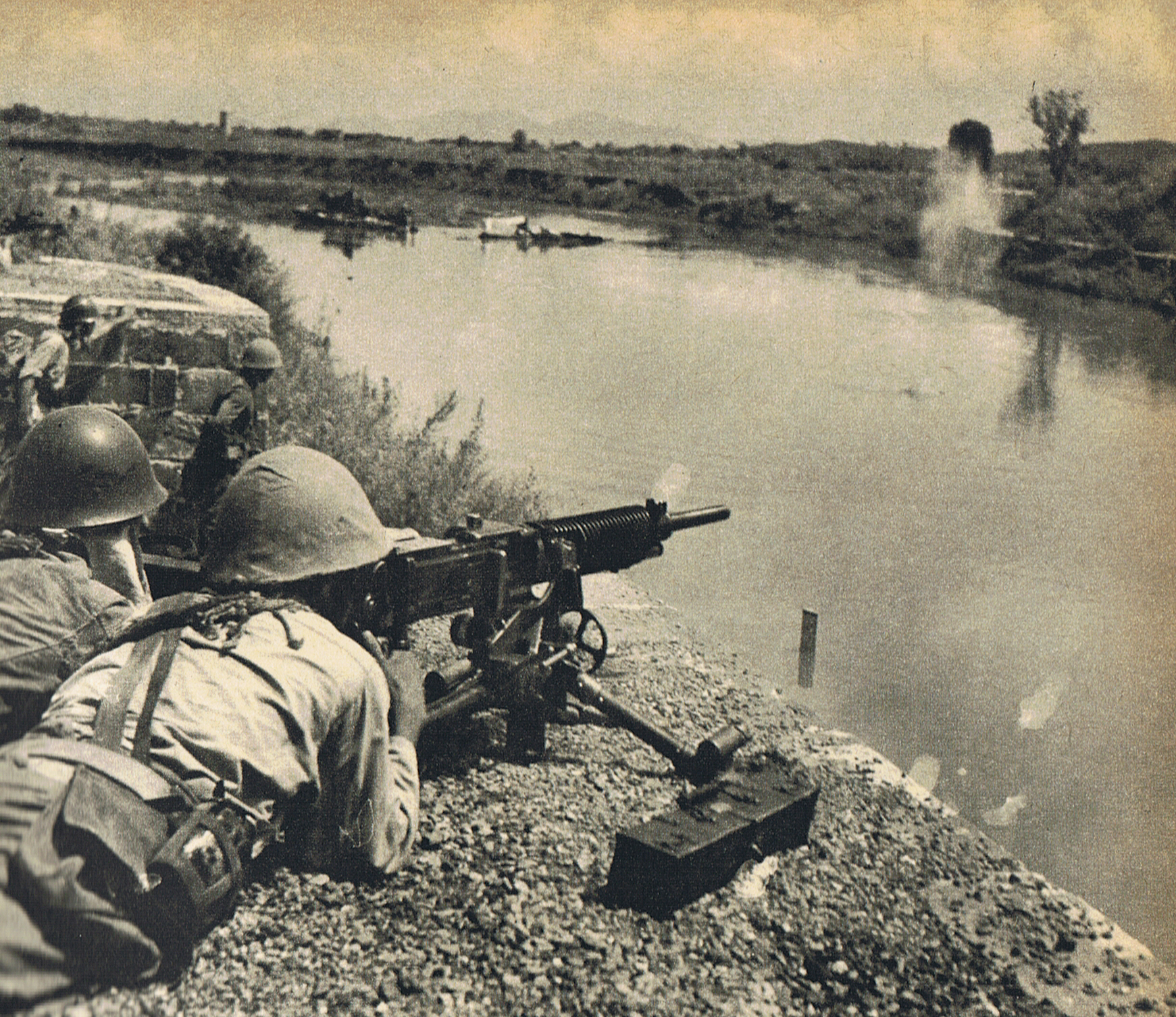
Japanese soldiers with a Type 92 machine gun during the 1941 Battle of Changsha

=== Edged weapons ===
- Type 30 bayonet
- Guntō (sword)

=== Sidearms ===
- Type 14 Nambu (Standard issue sidearm of the Japanese army)
- Browning FN M1910
- Colt M1903 Pocket Hammerless
- Hamada Type pistol
- Inagaki pistol (produced in very small quantities)
- Type 94 Nambu
- Sugiura pistol (produced in very small quantities)
- Type 26 revolver
- Astra 900 (captured from Chinese)
- Mauser C96 (captured from Chinese. Issued to collaborationist Chinese and Manchurian forces)
- Luger P08 (captured from Dutch Forces)

=== Submachine guns ===
- Type 100 Nambu (Issue to infantry in any final battle in WW2. Due to facing powerful allies advancing and need more firepower to defend. Being forced issue the gun to the infantry unit)
- Type Be (SIG Bergmann adopted by the SNLF. It was not issued to troops fighting on the Pacific Front)
- Type Su (Steyr-Solothurn S1-100)
- Thompson (captured Chinese copies, unofficial issue)

=== Rifles ===
- Type 99 Arisaka (standard issue rifle, partially replaced the Type 38 rifle)
  - Type 99 Arisaka sniper rifle (attached with NTC(Nippon Typewriter Company) Kogaku 4x 7° field of view Scope)
- Type 38 Arisaka (origin standard issue rifle, also produced in shortened version, replaced by the Type 99 Arisaka, still used till the end of the war)
  - Type 97 Arisaka sniper rifle (a scoped Type 38 Arisaka rifle)
- Type I Arisaka (used for training, issued to Naval guard and some garrison units)
- Type 44 Arisaka (used by cavalry)
- Type 2 TERA (used by Teishin Shudan at later stages of the war)
- Geweer M.95 (captured from Dutch forces)

=== Light Machine guns ===
- Type 99 Nambu light machine gun (standard issue light machine gun to replace the Type 96 Nambu)
- Type 96 Nambu light machine gun (replaced by the Type 99 Nambu)
- Type 11 Nambu light machine gun (replaced by Type 96 Nambu)
- Type 92 machine gun (copy of the Lewis machine gun. Mainly used as aircraft gun)
- FN Model 30 (captured from Chinese forces)
- ZB vz. 26 (captured from Chinese forces. Mainly issued to Chinese collaborationist forces)
- Madsen machine gun (captured from Dutch forces)
- Training light machine guns (Blank-firing training light machine guns used in paramilitary training in secondary schools)

=== Heavy Machine guns ===
- Type 92 Nambu heavy machine gun (Main fire support weapon of the Japanese army)
- Type 1 heavy machine gun (limited use)
- Type 3 heavy machine gun
- Type 97 heavy tank machine gun (Tank machine gun, less common as infantry gun due to its weight)

=== Grenades ===
- Type 97 fragmentation hand grenade (standard issue grenade of the Japanese army)
- Type 3 grenade
- Type 4 grenade
- Type 23 grenade (Chinese grenade)
- Type 91 fragmentation discharger/hand grenade
- Type 91 Incendiary
- Type 98 stick grenade
- Type 99 rifle/hand fragmentation grenade
- Type 99 Hako-Baku-Rai (Magnetic charge that could be used either as grenade or mine)
- Incendiary stick grenade
- Molotov cocktail

=== Grenade dischargers ===
- Type 2 rifle grenade launcher
- Type 10 grenade discharger
- Type 89 grenade discharger
- Type 100 grenade discharger

=== Flamethrowers ===
- Type 93 and Type 100

=== Mortars ===
- Type 2 12 cm mortar
- Type 11 70 mm infantry mortar
- Type 90 light mortar
- Type 93 150 mm infantry mortar
- Type 94 90 mm infantry mortar
- Type 96 150 mm infantry mortar
- Type 97 81 mm infantry mortar
- Type 97 90 mm infantry mortar
- Type 97 150 mm infantry mortar
- Type 98 50 mm mortar
- Type 99 81 mm mortar

=== Anti-tank weapons ===
- Type 4 70 mm AT rocket launcher
- Type 11 37 mm infantry gun
- Type 97 20 mm anti-tank rifle

=== Guided explosive weapons ===
- I-Go (Remote-controlled explosive machine)

== Republic of Latvia ==
=== Sidearms ===
- Nagant 1895
- P08 Luger

=== Submachine guns ===
- Tallinn Arsenal Smg

=== Rifles ===
- Pattern 1914 Enfield
- Ross Mk IIIB
- SMLE Mk III
- Mosin-Nagant M1891

=== Machine guns ===
- Vickers-Berthier
- Lewis guns
- Chauchat
- Vickers mg
- ZB vz.26
- Madsen

=== Grenades ===
- Mills bomb

== Republic of Lithuania ==
=== Sidearms ===
- Browning Hi-Power
- P08 Luger

=== Rifles ===
- Mauser VZ24L
- FN M1930

=== Machine guns ===
- MG 08
- PM 1910
- ZB-26
- MG 08/15

=== Grenades ===
- Lithuanian Stielhandgranate

=== Mortars ===
- 81mm Brandt Mle 27/31 M1934 Tampella

== Grand-Duchy of Luxembourg ==
=== Sidearms ===
- Browning Hi-Power (Brigade Piron)
- Webley revolver (Brigade Piron)
- FN M1900
- FN 1910
- Nagant 1884 revolver with bayonet other variants (Gendarmerie)

=== Submachine guns ===
- MP 18
- Pieper Bayard Mi34 (MP-28/II variant)

=== Rifles ===
- Enfield Pattern P1914
- Lee–Enfield rifle
- Ross rifle
- Mauser Gewehr 98 (Army)
- Mauser Karabiner 98k (Luxembourgish resistance)
- Mauser 1900 (derived from Swedish Mauser 1896) (Gendarmerie)
- FN 1924/30 carbine

=== Machine guns ===
- Browning M1918 (Brigade Piron)
- Bren machine gun (Brigade Piron)
- Vickers machine gun (Brigade Piron)
- MG 08

=== Anti-tank weapons ===
- Boys anti-tank rifle
- PIAT (Brigade Piron)

== Manchukuo ==
The Manchukuo Imperial Army served under Japanese Command in Second Sino-Japanese War and during Invasion of Manchuria in 1945.

=== Sidearms ===
- Astra Model 900
- FN M1900
- FN M1910
- Luger P08
- Nambu pistol
- Mauser C96
- Type 26 revolver
- Type 94 Nambu pistol

=== Submachine guns ===
- Erma EMP-35
- SIG Bergmann 1920

=== Rifles ===
- Arisaka Type 30
- Arisaka Type 38 rifle (standard issue rifle)
- Arisaka Type 99 rifle
- Type 44 carbine (used by Elite Cavalry units)
- Hanyang Type 88 (used by second-line units)
- Mauser Karabiner 98k (captured)

=== Light Machine guns ===
- Nambu Type 11 light machine gun
- Nambu Type 96 light machine gun
- ZB vz. 26
- ZB vz. 30

=== Heavy Machine guns ===
- Nambu Type 3 heavy machine gun
- Nambu Type 92 heavy machine gun (Intended to replace the Type 3 heavy machine gun but not provided in sufficient numbers)

=== Grenade dischargers ===
- Type 10 grenade discharger

== Mengjiang United Autonomous Government ==
The Inner Mongolian Army served under Japanese Command in Second Sino-Japanese War and during Invasion of Manchuria in 1945.

=== Sidearms ===
- Nambu pistol
- Type 26 revolver
- Luger P08
- Mauser C96

=== Submachine guns ===
- SIG Bergmann 1920

=== Rifles ===
- Arisaka Type 30
- Arisaka Type 38
- Arisaka Type 99
- Hanyang 88

=== Machine guns ===
- Lewis gun
- Type 11 light machine gun
- Type 92 heavy machine gun
- ZB vz. 26

== United Mexican States ==
=== Sidearms ===
- Colt M1911A1 (Mexican volunteers)
- Colt M1917 (Mexican volunteers)
- Obrégon pistol (home front)
- P08 Luger (home front)
- Mauser C96 (home front)

=== Rifles ===
- M1 Carbine (Mexican volunteers)
- M1 Garand (Mexican volunteers)
- Springfield M1903 (Mexican volunteers)
- Mauser M1936 short rifle (home front)

=== Machine guns ===
- Browning M1918A2 (Mexican volunteers)
- Browning M1919 (Mexican volunteers)
- Mendoza M1934 (home front)

=== Submachine guns ===
- Thompson M1A1 (Mexican volunteers)
- Grease gun (Mexican volunteers)

=== Grenades ===
- Mk II fragmentation grenade (Mexican volunteers)

== Mongolian People's Republic ==
The Mongolian People's Army, under Soviet Command, served in Manchuria in 1945 and in the Battles of Khalkhin Gol in 1939

=== Sidearms ===
- Nagant M1895
- Tokarev TT-33

=== Submachine guns ===
- PPSh-41

=== Rifles ===
- Mosin–Nagant

=== Machine guns ===
- DP-27
- Maxim M1910
- DShK machine gun
- Goryunov SG-43

== Kingdom of Nepal ==
Weaponry used by the Royal Nepalese Army during World War II.

During the Second World War, the Kingdom of Nepal supported the British Empire and the Allied powers. Nepal did not deploy an independent army as a separate combat force, but thousands of Nepalese soldiers served in the British Indian Army as part of the Gurkha regiments. Gurkha troops fought in multiple theatres, including North Africa, Italy, Burma, and the Pacific War.

Nepalese forces were mainly equipped with British Empire weapons, including the Lee–Enfield rifle, Bren light machine gun, and traditional Kukri fighting knife carried by Gurkha soldiers.

=== Edged weapons ===
- Kukri – Traditional Nepalese curved fighting knife and the iconic weapon of Gurkha soldiers. Carried as a personal sidearm and used for close combat.

=== Sidearms ===
- Enfield No.2 – Standard British service revolver used by Gurkha officers, artillery crews, and support personnel.
- Webley Mk.VI – Older British service revolver retained in limited numbers.
- Colt M1911 – Supplied in small numbers through Allied channels and used by selected personnel.

=== Rifles ===
- Short Magazine Lee–Enfield Mk III* – Standard service rifle used by Gurkha infantry units throughout World War II.
- Lee–Enfield No.4 Mk I – Introduced during the later stages of the war and gradually replaced older SMLE rifles.
- Pattern 1914 Enfield – Used mainly as a sniper rifle and by specialist units.
- M1 Garand – Supplied in limited numbers through Allied sources.

=== Submachine guns ===
- Thompson M1928 and M1928A1 – Used by Gurkha units and British Indian Army troops, especially for close-range combat.
- Sten – British submachine gun introduced later in the war and used by infantry and special units.
- M1 Thompson – Simplified wartime Thompson variant used in limited numbers.

=== Machine guns ===
- Vickers Mk.I Machine Gun – Standard heavy machine gun used by British and Gurkha infantry battalions.
- Bren Mk.I and Mk.II LMG – Standard squad light machine gun of Gurkha infantry units.
- Lewis gun – Older light machine gun retained in limited service.

=== Grenades ===
- No.36M Mills Bomb – Standard British fragmentation grenade used by Gurkha infantry.
- No.69 Mk.I grenade – British concussion grenade used during World War II.
- No.77 grenade – White phosphorus grenade used mainly for smoke and incendiary effects.

=== Mortars ===
- Ordnance SBML 2-inch mortar – Light infantry mortar used at platoon level.
- Ordnance ML 3-inch mortar – Standard infantry support mortar used by Gurkha battalions.

=== Anti-tank weapons ===
- Boys anti-tank rifle – British anti-tank rifle used during the early years of World War II.
- PIAT – British anti-tank weapon introduced from 1943 and used by Allied infantry units.

=== Artillery ===
- Ordnance QF 25-pounder – Main field artillery gun used by British Indian Army and Gurkha artillery units.
- QF 3.7-inch mountain howitzer – Mountain artillery weapon suitable for Himalayan and jungle terrain.

== Kingdom of the Netherlands ==
The weaponry used by Royal Netherlands Army up to 1940 and colonial troops of Royal Netherlands East Indies Army (KNIL) up 1942. After occupation Dutch government continued in exile. Free Dutch Forces were equipped by Western Allies - Mainly British Commonwealth.

=== Sidearms ===
- Browning FN M1910/22 (standard issue sidearm both in 7.65 and 9mm calibers. Designated as Pistool M.25)
- Revolver M1873
- Borchardt-Luger pistol (used by KNIL and by Navy. Designated as M.11 Pistool)
- Browning FN M1903 (used by Navy)
- Sauer M1930 (used by Navy)
- Mauser C96 (used by the KNIL)

=== Submachine guns ===
- MP 28 (used by the KNIL. Bought 150 submachine guns before war)
- Thompson M1928 (used by the KNIL. Bought 2000 submachine guns before war. Also used by Free Dutch Forces)
- Sten submachine gun (used by Free Dutch Forces)
- Owen submachine gun (used by Free Dutch Forces on Pacific)

=== Rifles ===
- Geweer M.95 (standard issue rifle by both Army and KNIL. Also known as Dutch Mannlicher M1895. Produced also in various carbine models)
- Johnson M1941 rifle (used by the KNIL. Bought 1999 Rifles before war)
- Lee–Enfield No.1 Mk III and No.4 Mk I (used by Free Dutch Forces)
- Pattern 1914 Enfield (used by Free Dutch Forces on Pacific)

=== Light Machine guns ===
- Lewis machine gun (Main light machine gun adopted by Army as Mitrailleur M.20 using 97-round magazines)
- Madsen machine gun (used by the KNIL as Karabijnmitrailleur with shortened barrel)
- Breda M30 (limited use by KNIL. Received captured examples by British forces in East Africa)
- Bren machine gun (used by Free Dutch Forces)

=== Medium Machine guns ===
- Schwarzlose M.08 (Main machine gun used by Army)

=== Heavy Machine guns ===
- Spandau M.25 (Dutch variant of MG 08. Mainly used in anti-aircraft platoons)
- Vickers machine gun (adopted by Army as M.18. and by KNIL as M.23)
- M1895 Colt–Browning machine gun (used by KNIL as anti-aircraft machine gun)

=== Grenades ===
- Eihandgranaat No.1
- Eihandgranaat No.3
- Hexiet Rookhandgranaat (Smoke grenade)
- Mk.2 fragmentation hand grenade (used by the KNIL)
- Offensieve handgranaat No.2 1928 (used by the KNIL)
- Offensieve Handgranaat No.3 1941 (used by the KNIL. Construction based on MK3 grenade delivered in 1941–1942)

=== Mortars ===
- Brandt Mle 27/31 (Mortier van 8 Brandt or M.27/31. Used by both Army and KNIL)

=== Anti-tank weapons ===
- Solothurn S-18/1000 (125 rifles delivered to Royal Netherlands Army and 72 to KNIL)
- Boys anti-tank rifle (used by Free Dutch Forces from 1943)
- PIAT (used by Free Dutch Forces from 1943)

== Dominion of New Zealand ==
The 2nd New Zealand Expeditionary Force that served in Africa, Mediterranean and Pacific theatre

=== Sidearms ===
- Enfield No.2
- Smith & Wesson Military & Police
- Webley revolver

=== Submachine guns ===
- Thompson M1928 & M1928A1
- Sten submachine gun
- Owen submachine gun

=== Rifles ===
- Lee–Enfield No.1 Mk III* (standard issue rifle)
- Charlton automatic rifle (used by Home Guard)
- Pattern 1914 Enfield

=== Machine guns ===
- Lewis machine gun
- Bren machine gun
- Vickers machine gun

=== Grenades ===
- No.36M grenade (Also known as the "Mills bomb")

=== Mortars ===
- SBML 2-inch mortar
- ML 3-inch mortar

=== Anti-tank weapons ===
- PIAT
- Boys anti-tank rifle

== Kingdom of Norway ==
Weapons used by Norwegian Army during the Norwegian campaign in 1940. Norwegian resistance movement used weapons from various sources, Commandos primarily used British equipment. Norwegian police troops in Sweden were recruited from refugees and trained in secret camps by Swedish military and used Swedish equipment, they originally intended to help maintain order in a post-war Norway however they partially participated in Liberation of Finnmark

=== Edged weapons ===
- M/1894 (Bayonet)

=== Sidearms ===
- Colt Kongsberg M1914 (Licensed copy of the Colt M1911, standard issue for the Norwegian Army until 1940)
- Nagant M1893 (Earlier service revolver that preceded the Colt Kongsberg M1914 in service and was still in use by 1940)
- Smith & Wesson Military & Police (used by the Norwegian armed forces in exile)
- Webley revolver (used by the Norwegian armed forces in exile)
- Lahti Husqvarna m/40 (used by the police troops trained in neutral Sweden)

=== Submachine guns ===
- M3 submachine gun (used by the Norwegian Resistance)
- Sten submachine gun (used by the Norwegian armed forces in exile and by the Norwegian Resistance)
- Thompson submachine gun (used by Commandos)
- Kulsprutepistol m/37-39 (used by the police troops trained in neutral Sweden)

=== Rifles ===
- Krag-Jørgensen M1894 (Standard service rifle of the Norwegian forces until 1940, carbines and sniper versions were also used)
- Lee–Enfield rifle (Norwegian Resistance and Commandos)
- Pattern 1914 Enfield (used by the Norwegian armed forces in exile)
- M1 Carbine (used by Commandos)
- Mauser Karabiner 98k (Norwegian Resistance)
- Swedish Mauser M/96 and M/38 (used by the police troops trained in neutral Sweden)
- Automatgevär M42 (used by the police troops trained in neutral Sweden)

=== Machine guns ===
- Madsen M14 and M22 (Standard light machine gun)
- Colt M/29 (Standard heavy machine gun and anti-aircraft defense)
- Hotchkiss M1898 (Had been replaced by the Colt M29 by 1940, but was still part of the armament of several fortifications)
- Bren machine gun (Norwegian Resistance and Commandos)
- Kg m/21 (used by the police troops trained in neutral Sweden)

== Commonwealth of the Philippines ==
Weaponry used by Philippine Army in Commonwealth period. Philippine Army mainly used the old American equipment from Philippine–American War. In 1941 Philippine Army was placed under command of USAFFE.

=== Edged weapons ===
- Bolo knife
- M1917 Bolo Knife
- Mark I trench knife
- M3 trench knife
- Bowie knife
- Balisong
- Gunong
- Kalis
- Kampilan
- Panabas
- Type 94 Shin Guntō (captured, used by guerrillas)
- Type 95 Shin Guntō (captured, used by guerrillas)
- Type 98 Shin Guntō (captured, used by guerrillas)
- Kai Guntō (captured, used by guerrillas)

=== Bayonet ===
- M4 bayonet
- M1905 bayonet
- M1910 bayonet
- M1917 bayonet
- Type 30 bayonet (captured)

=== Sidearms ===
- Colt M1911
- Colt Model 1903 Pocket Hammerless
- FP-45 Liberator
- M1917 revolver
- Smith & Wesson Model 10
- Colt New Service
- Colt Official Police
- Webley Revolver
- Enfield No. 2
- Nambu pistol (captured)
- Type 26 revolver (captured)

=== Submachine guns ===
- Thompson M1923, M1928, M1928A1, M1 & M1A1
- United Defense M42
- M3 & M3A1 Submachine Gun
- M50 Reising
- Sten Submachine Gun (Delivered to resistance against Japanese occupation)
- Type 100 submachine gun (captured)

=== Shotguns ===
- Winchester Model 1897 (Purchased for Philippine Scouts and Philippine Constabulary)
- Winchester M1912
- Browning Auto-5
- Remington Model 10
- Ithaca 37
- Stevens Model 520/620

=== Rifles ===
- M1 carbine (used by guerrillas)
- M1 Garand
- M1941 Johnson rifle (Delivered to resistance against Japanese occupation)
- Springfield M1903 (Main rifle at the beginning of the war)
- Enfield M1917 (Main rifle at the beginning of the war)
- Constabulary M1899
- Arisaka Type 30 (captured, used by guerrillas)
- Arisaka Type 35 (captured, used by guerrillas)
- Arisaka Type 38 (captured, used by guerrillas)
- Arisaka Type 99 (captured, used by guerrillas)
- Winchester Model 70 (used by guerrillas)

=== Sniper rifles ===
- M1C Garand (used by guerrillas)
- M1D Garand (used by guerrillas)
- Springfield M1903A1 (used by guerrillas)
- Springfield M1903A4 (used by guerrillas)
- Winchester Model 70 (used by guerrillas)

=== Machine guns ===
- Browning M1918
- Colt-Browning M1895
- Browning M1917A1
- Browning M1919A4
- Browning M2
- M1941 Johnson machine gun (Delivered to resistance against Japanese occupation)
- Lewis Gun
- Type 3 heavy machine gun (captured)
- Type 11 light machine gun (captured)
- Type 92 heavy machine gun (captured)
- Type 93 heavy machine gun (captured)
- Type 99 light machine gun (captured)

=== Grenades ===
- Mk2 grenade
- Type 91 Grenade (captured)
- Type 97 Grenade (captured)
- AN-M8 smoke grenade (used by guerrillas)
- AN-M14 Incendiary (used by guerrillas)
- M15 Smoke WP (used by guerrillas)
- M18 smoke grenade (used by guerrillas)
- Frangible Grenade M1 (used by guerrillas)
- Molotov Fire Grenade
- Dynamite Sticks

=== Grenade launcher ===
- M1 grenade adapter (used by guerrillas)
- M9 rifle grenade (used by guerrillas)
- M17 rifle grenade (used by guerrillas)
- M7 grenade launcher (used by guerrillas)
- M8 grenade launcher (used by guerrillas)
- Type 10 grenade discharger (captured)
- Type 89 grenade discharger (captured)

=== Anti-tank weapon ===
- Boys anti-tank rifle (Delivered to resistance against Japanese occupation)

=== Flamethrowers ===
- M1 & M1A1 Flamethrower
- M2 flamethrower

=== Mortars ===
- M1 mortar
- M2 mortar
- M2 4.2-inch mortar
- Stokes mortar
- Brandt Mle 27/31

=== Anti-tank weapons ===
- M1A1 and M9 Bazooka rocket launcher (used by guerrillas)
- M18 recoilless rifle (used by guerrillas)
- M20 recoilless rifle (used by guerrillas)

== Second Polish Republic ==
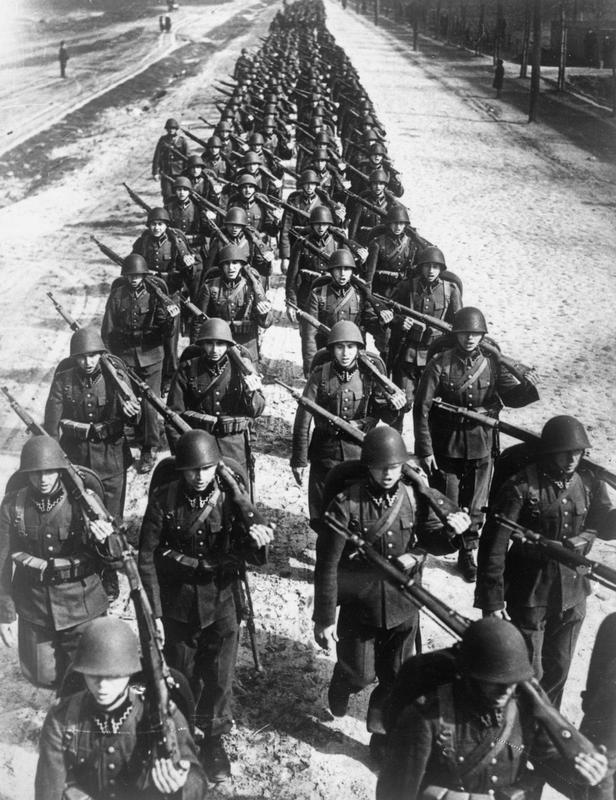
Polish infantry marching with their rifles

Before Germany conquered Poland the Polish army was chiefly equipped with weapons of its own making. After the German and Soviet occupation, the Polish government continued in exile. Polish armed forces in the West were equipped by the Western Allies, principally the UK and those formed in the East under the USSR were equipped with Soviet equipment, Polish Army in France was equipped with French equipment. Within occupied Poland the Polish resistance forces were equipped with weapons from many sources.

=== Edged weapons ===
- Bagnet wz.1898/05 (Bayonet acquired by Poland after WWI, used on Kb.wz.98)
- Bagnet karabinowy wz.24 & wz.27 (Bayonet for all Polish Mauser Rifles and Carbines and modified Mosin Carbine)
- Bagnet karabinowy wz.28 & wz.29 (Bayonet for Kb.wz.98 and Kbk.wz.29)

=== Sidearms ===
- Radom Pistolet wz.35 Vis (Standard service sidearm in 1939)
- Nagant wz. 30 (Polish derivative of Nagant M1895. Used by State Police)
- Ruby M1914 (Used by Polish Army in France)
- SACM M1935A (used by Polish Army in France)
- Star M1914 (used by Polish Army in France)
- Colt M1911 (used by the Polish Armed Forces in the West)
- M1917 Revolver (used by the Polish Armed Forces in the West)
- Enfield No.2 (used by the Polish Armed Forces in the West)
- Tokarev TT-33 (used by the Polish Armed Forces in the East)

=== Submachine gun ===
- Mors wz. 39 (Prototype only. Prototypes issued to the 3rd Rifle Battalion and the 39th Infantry Division)
- Thompson submachine gun (used by the Polish Armed Forces in the West)
- Sten submachine gun (used by the Polish Armed Forces in the West and locally produced by resistance movement)
- Błyskawica submachine gun (used by the resistance movement)
- PPS submachine gun (used by the Polish Armed Forces in the East)
- PPSh-41 (used by the Polish Armed Forces in the East)
- MP 40 (used by the resistance movement)

=== Rifles ===
- Karabin wz.98 (Main service rifle in 1939, also used by the resistance movement. Polish copy of Mauser Gewehr 98)
- Karabin wz.98a (Derivative of kb. wz.98)
- Karabinek wz.29 (Main service rifle in 1939, based on the Karabin wz.98a)
- Karabinek wz.98 (Based on Kar 98AZ, used by Polish cavalry and horse artillery)
- Karabinek wz. 91/98/25 (Based on Mosin–Nagant rifle. Limited use by National Defense)
- Lebel M1886/93 (used by some units of National Defense in 1939)
- Berthier M1907/15 rifle (used by second-line troops in 1939 and by Polish Army in France)
- MAS-36 (used by Polish Army in France)
- Lee–Enfield No.1 Mk III and No.4 Mk I (used by the Polish Armed Forces in the West)
- Mosin–Nagant rifle (used by the Polish Armed Forces in the East)
- SVT-40 (used by the Polish Armed Forces in the East)
- Mauser Karabiner 98k (used by the resistance movement)

=== Machine guns ===
- Browning wz.1928 (Standard light machine gun variant of the Browning M1918)
- Bergmann MG 15nA machine gun (limited use by some units of National Defense)
- Chauchat 1915/27 (Converted to Mauser 7.92×57mm. Limited use by some units of National Defense)
- Ckm wz.30 (Polish standard heavy machine gun variant of the Browning M1917A1)
- MG 08/15 (Mainly used as anti-aircraft weapon Used by artillery, sappers and National Defense)
- Ckm wz. 25 Hotchkiss (Hotchkiss M1914 converted to 7.92×57mm Mauser. Limited use by second-line units and by Polish Border Guards. Mainly used in armored vehicles)
- FM 24/29 light machine gun (used by Polish Army in France)
- Bren machine gun (used by the Polish Armed Forces in the West)
- Browning M1919 (used by the Polish Armed Forces in the West)
- Vickers machine gun (used by the Polish Armed Forces in the West)
- Degtyaryov machine gun (used by the Polish Armed Forces in the East)
- Maxim wz. 1910 (used by the Polish Armed Forces in the East)
- MG 34 (used by the resistance movement)
- ZB vz. 26 (used by the resistance movement)

=== Grenades ===
- Defensive grenade wz. 33
- Offensive grenade wz. 33
- Defensive grenade wz. 24
- Offensive grenade wz. 24
- ET wz.40 (also known as ET-40 "Filipinka". Grenade based on ET-38 anti-tank grenade. Used by Polish resistance)
- R wz.42 (also known as "Sidolówka". Used by Polish resistance)
- Granat "Karbidówka" (used by Polish resistance)
- M1924 Stielhandgranate (used by the resistance movement)

=== Grenade launchers ===
- Granatnik wz.36

=== Mortars ===
- wz.18 mortar (Stokes mortar)
- wz.18/31 mortar (Brandt Mle 27/31 produced under license)
- wz.28 mortar (Polish produced Stokes mortar)
- wz.31 mortar (Brandt Mle 27/31 produced under license)
- SBML 2-inch mortar (used by the Polish Armed Forces in the West)

=== Anti-tank weapons ===
- Kb ppanc wz.35
- Boys anti-tank rifle (used by the Polish Armed Forces in the West)
- PIAT (used by the Polish Armed Forces in the West, Used during the Warsaw Uprising)
- PTRD-41 (used by the Polish Armed Forces in the East)
- PTRS-41 (used by the Polish Armed Forces in the East)
- Panzerfaust (used by the resistance movement)

== Kingdom of Romania ==
Romania joined the Axis Powers in 1940 and the Romanian Royal Army fought on that side until August 1944. After a coup d'état in August 1944 Romania fought alongside the USSR against Germany and Hungary.

=== Sidearms ===
- Beretta M1934 (approx. 40000 pistols imported in 1941. Standard issue officer pistol)
- Steyr M1912 (standard issue sidearm of machine gunners)
- Ruby M1914
- Nagant M1895 (captured)
- Tokarev TT-33 (captured)

=== Submachine guns ===
- PM Orița Md. 1941 (Entered service in 1943)
- PM Beretta (Between 1941 and 1942 Romania imported 5000 MAB 38A and 38/42 models)
- PM Mauser (used by paratroopers until replaced with MP40)
- PM Schmeisser Md. 18 I
- PM Schmeisser Md. 28 II (issued to Iron Guard)
- PM Md. 1940 (used by paratroopers)
- PM Md. 1941
- PM Rus (captured)

=== Rifles ===
- vz.24 (Standard infantry rifle, adopted in 1938. Also used as a sniper rifle)
- Mannlicher M1893 (Also known as the M93. Used by some units at the beginning of the war and Naval infantry. Replaced by Vz.24 rifle)
- Mannlicher M1895 (used by reserve units)
- Mosin–Nagant rifle (captured and used by snipers)
- Gewehr 43 (Very small numbers supplied by Nazi Germany)
- StG 44 (Very small numbers supplied by Nazi Germany)

=== Machine guns ===
- ZB vz. 30 (Standard light machine gun. Imported and locally produced under license)
- ZB-53 (Main heavy machine gun)
- MG 34
- MG 42
- Schwarzlose M1907/12 (Converted to Mauser 7.92×57mm)
- Hotchkiss M1914
- Ckm wz.30 (Imported from Poland in interwar period)
- PM M1910 (captured)

=== Grenades ===
- MAN 1939 (Polish wz.33 offensive and defensive grenades produced under a license)
- Granát vz.34 (Impact grenade Kyser)
- Geballte Ladung (Satchel charge made of German stick grenades)
- CIAG smoke grenade
- Unknown Romanian grenade

=== Flamethrowers ===
- Pignone flamethrower model 1937
- Flammenwerfer 35
- Lanciafiamme Modello 35
- ROKS flamethrowers (captured)

=== Mortars ===
- Brandt Mle 1935
- Brandt Mle 27/31
- M1938 mortar (captured and copied as Reșița Model 1942)

=== Anti-tank weapons ===
- Panzerfaust
- Panzerschreck
- PTRD-41 (captured)
- PTRS-41 (captured)

== Government of National Salvation ==
The Government of National Salvation was a Serbian collaborationist state under the leadership of Milan Nedić.

=== Sidearms ===
- M1910/22 (Main pistol. Designated as M.22)
- Modèle 1892 revolver (Provided by France after WW1)
- Ruby pistol (Provided by France after WW1)
- Rast-Gasser M1893 (WW1 stockpiles)
- Steyr M1912 (WW1 stockpiles)

=== Rifles ===
- Kar98k
- Yugo Mauser M1924
- Mauser-Koka
- Berthier rifle
- Lebel Model 1886/93 rifle
- Carcano rifle (captured & WW1 stockpiles)
- Serbian Mauser M1899 (derived from Mauser M1895) (shortened & rechambered to 7.92×57mm during interwar)
- Serbian Mauser M1899/07(08) carbine
- Serbian Mauser M1910 (derived from Gewehr 98)

=== Submachine guns ===
- MP 40
- Erma EMP
- Thompson submachine gun

=== Machine guns ===
- MG 34
- MG 42
- ZB vz. 26 (Bought 1500 light machine guns)
- ZB vz. 30J (Standard LMG. Produced under license and bought in 1936)
- Chauchat M1915/26 (chambered in 7.9×57mm m1888)
- Hotchkiss M1914
- Schwarzlose 1912/26 mg (chambered in 7.92)
- ZB-53

=== Grenades ===
- Vasić M12
- M38 offensive/defensive grenade
- M35 offensive/defensive grenade

== First Slovak Republic ==
Weaponry of First Slovak Republic participating in the conflict from 1939 to 1944 on the side of Axis powers.

=== Edged weapons ===
- Bodák vz. 24 (Bayonet for Vz.24 rifle)

=== Sidearms ===
- Pistole vz. 22
- Pistole vz. 24
- Luger P08

=== Rifles ===
- ZB vz. 24 (standard issue rifle)
- Mauser Karabiner 98k

=== Submachine guns ===
- MP 40
- PPD-40 (captured)
- ZK-383 (In total 190 submachine guns were delivered at the beginning of 1943)

=== Light machine guns ===
- ZB vz. 26
- ZB vz. 30

=== Heavy machine guns ===
- Schwarzlose M1907/12 (as kulomet vz. 24)
- MG 34 (as Těžký kulomet vz. 34)

=== Grenades ===
- Stielhandgranate 24

=== Mortars ===
- 8 cm minomet vz. 36 (Modified variant of Brandt Mle 27/31)

== Union of South Africa ==
The Union of South Africa serving under UK command. Served in East Africa, North Africa, Madagascar, and Italy.

=== Sidearms ===
- Webley revolver
- Smith & Wesson Victory

=== Submachine guns ===
- Reising M50
- Thompson M1928
- Thompson M1928A1
- Thompson M1A1
- Sten submachine gun

=== Rifles ===
- Lee–Enfield No.1 Mk III* and No.4 Mk I

=== Machine guns ===
- Bren machine gun
- Vickers machine gun

=== Mortars ===
- Ordnance SBML 2-inch mortar

=== Anti-tank weapons ===
- PIAT

== USSR ==
Weaponry used by Red Army during World War II.

=== Edged weapons ===
- NR-40 knife (standard issued melee weapon of the Soviet red army)
- M1927 Shashka (Cossack cavalry sword)
- AVS-36 bayonet
- Mosin-Nagant 1891/30 bayonet
- SVT-40 M1940 bayonet
- S84/98 III bayonet (captured)

=== Handguns ===
- Tokarev TT-33 (standard issued pistol of the Red Army)
- Nagant M1895
- Mauser C96 (captured from WW1 and issued during WW2)
- Colt M1911 (American Lend-Lease)
- Voevodin pistol (adopted briefly in 1942)

=== Shotgun ===
- TOZ-B (TOZ Model B is a Russian civilian hunting shotgun. But not officially issued to red army. It still used by the red army in the beginning of the war. Due to shortage of arms. So used everything available in their arsenal)

=== Submachine guns ===
- PPSh-41 (standard issued SMG of the Red Army)
- PPS-42/PPS-43 (2nd most preferred SMG of the Red Army)
- PPD-34/38
- PPD-40
- MP 40 (captured/ Grass Is Greener syndrome.)
- Thompson submachine gun (American Lend-Lease)
- Reising M50 (American Lend-Lease)

=== Automatic rifles ===
- AVS-36
- AVT-40(selective-fire variant of SVT-40)
- Fedorov Avtomat (Reissued during Winter War)

=== Rifles ===
- Mosin–Nagant M1891/1930 (Standard-issued rifle of the Red Army)
- Mosin–Nagant M1938 carbine
- Mosin–Nagant M1944 carbine
- SVT-38 and SVT-40 (Some of them used as sniper rifle)
- Kar98k (captured from the Germans)
- Winchester M1895

=== Machine guns ===
- DP-27 light machine gun (Erroneously called DP-28 in the west, standard issued LMG of the Red Army)
- Maxim M1910/1930 heavy machine gun (Main fire support weapon of the Red Army)
- Goryunov SG-43 (Used by elite troops and tank crew only. Still very limited. Due to late joinning the war causing lack of spare-parts in front line and many of it still inside the factory warehouse waiting for the Sokolov wheeled mount. Some of those are on the way inside the transportation train(Might get destroy by German bombers). Not many successfully reach to the front line trenches)
- DShK-38 heavy machine gun (only allowed as a ground anti-air defense weapon in Soviet military bases/camps and mounted onto the IS-2 tank for anti-air. Never issued to infantry units, due to expensive ammunition and lack of vehicle to transport the weapon to front line due to heavy weight. Only used for anti-air)
- DS-39 (Production discontinued after the German invasion)
- Bren light machine gun (British Lend-Lease)
- MG 34 (captured from the Germans)

=== Grenades ===
- RGD-33 (standard issued hand grenade of the Soviet red army)
- F1 grenade (Also known as "limonka". World War 2 F1 grenades were painted dark olive)
- M1914/30
- RG-41
- RG-42
- RGU hand grenade
- RPG-6
- RPG-40 (anti-tank grenade)
- RPG-41 (anti-tank grenade)
- RPG-43 (anti-tank grenade)
- M1924 Stielhandgranate (captured from the Germans)
- Panzerwurfmine (captured from Germans)
- Molotov fire grenade

=== Grenade launchers ===
- Dyakonoff grenade launcher (Attachment on the M91/30 rifle only)
- VPGS-41 Rifle Grenade (Rifle Grenade mounted on Mosin Nagant Model 1891/30)
- Schiessbecher (captured from Germans. Rifle Grenade mounted on Kar98k)

=== Flamethrowers ===
- ROKS-2 & ROKS-3

=== Mortars ===
- 37mm spade mortar
- 50mm RM-38, RM-39 & RM-40
- 82-BM-36 (or M-36)
- 82-BM-37 (or M-37)
- 82-PM-41 (or M-41)
- 107mm M1938 mortar (or 107-PBHM 38)
- M1938 mortar (or 120-PM-38)
- 120-PM-43 mortar (or M1943 mortar)
- 160 mm mortar M1943

=== Anti-tank weapons ===
- PTRD-41 anti-tank rifle (Dyegtyaryov M1941)
- PTRS-41 anti-tank rifle (Simonov M1941)
- Ampulomet
- M1 Bazooka (American Lend-Lease)
- Boys anti-tank rifle (British Lend-Lease)
- PIAT (British Lend-Lease)
- Granatbüchse GrB-39 (captured from Germans)
- Panzerschreck (captured from Germans)
- Panzerfaust (captured from Germans)

== Kingdom of Thailand ==
=== Sidearms ===
- Astra 300
- Browning FN M1900
- Colt M1911
- Nambu Type 14
- Type 78 Luger pistol
- Type 79 Colt Super
- Type 80 Star
- Type 82 Colt Police Positive

=== Submachine guns ===
- Nambu Type 100
- Type 80 machine pistol

=== Rifles ===
- Siamese Types 46, 46/66, 47, 47/66 and 66 Mauser rifle (standard issue rifle)
- Type 83 Arisaka rifle (Japanese type 38 rifle in Thai service. Supplied by Japan)
- Type 83 Arisaka carbine
- Lee Enfield Mk III "Wild Tiger" rifle (used by Royal Thai Police. Adopted in 1919, as issue rifle for the Wild Tiger Corps.)
- ZH-29

=== Machine guns ===
- Type 66 Browning M1917
- Type 66 Madsen machine gun
- Type 92 heavy machine gun
- Vickers machine gun

=== Grenades ===
- Type 91 grenade
- Type 97 grenade

=== Grenade dischargers ===
- Type 10 grenade discharger

=== Anti-tank weapons ===
- Type 97 automatic cannon

== United Kingdom (including crown colonies, protectorates and concessions) ==
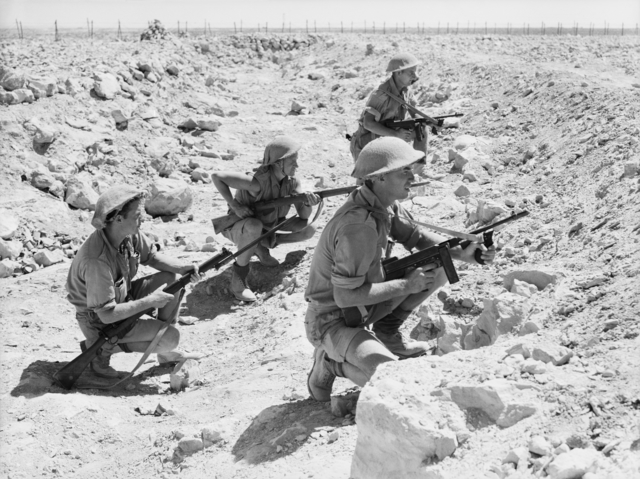
Australian soldiers at Tobruk, equipped with Thompson submachine guns and Lee-Enfield rifles

=== Edged weapons ===
- Fairbairn-Sykes dagger (standard issue)
- BC-41 dagger
- Kris dagger (British Malaya)
- Kukri machete (used by Gurkha regiments)
- Panga machete (used by the Union Defence Force (South Africa) )
- Parang knife (British Malaya)
- Smatchet knife sword.

=== Sidearms ===
- Enfield No.2 Mk I (standard issue sidearm adopted in 1932)
- Webley Mk.IV (.38/200) and Mk.VI (.455) (Mk.IV was adopted in 1942. Mk.VI was WWI era revolver that still remained in use due to shortages of sidearms)
- M1917 revolver (issued to the Home Guard)
- FN/Inglis Browning Hi-Power (as pistol No.2 Mk.I. Plausible use from late 1944)
- Colt M1911 (M1911A1s supplied through lend-lease with some configured to fire the .455 cartridge. Mainly issued to Commando units)
- Colt M1927 Official Police
- Smith & Wesson Victory (received in large quantities from Lend-Lease to fill shortages of handguns)
- Nambu Type 14 (British Malaya)
- Luger P-08 (British Malaya)

=== Submachine guns ===
- Sten Mk II (About 4 million produced from all sources, standard issue sub-machine gun of the British army)
- Thompson submachine gun (M1928, M1928A1 and M1A1 variants)
- Sterling submachine gun (A few prototypes used in trials)
- Lanchester submachine gun (copy of the German MP 28/II, used by the Royal Navy, RAF and some commando units)

=== Rifles ===
- Lee–Enfield No.1 Mk III and No.4 Mk I (standard issue rifle)
- Lee–Enfield No.5 Mk I "jungle carbine"
- Enfield Pattern P1914 (used by Home Guard)
- M1 Carbine (received approx 25,000 carbines from Lend-Lease)
- M1 Garand (received 38,000 as Lend-Lease)
- Enfield M1917 (Main rifle used by Home Guard)
- Springfield M1903 (used by Home Guard)
- Ross rifle (Supplied by Canada. Used by the Home Guard)
- De Lisle carbine (limited numbers, used by special forces such as Commandos)
- Arisaka Type 38 (British Malaya)
- Arisaka Type 99 (British Malaya)

=== Sniper rifles ===
- Enfield Pattern P1914
- Lee–Enfield No.4 Mk I (T) (attach with No.32 Mk III scope)

=== Machine guns ===
- Bren Mk I & Mk II light machine gun (standard issue)
- Vickers Mk I heavy machine gun (Main fire support weapon of the British Army)
- Lewis machine gun (Reissued after Fall of France when British Army lost most of their equipment at Dunkirk)
- Browning M1917 (used by the Home Guard)
- Browning M1919
- Colt–Browning M1895 (used by the Home Guard)
- Vickers K machine gun (limited use - LRDG in North Africa, some reconnaissance units in 1944/45)
- Vickers-Berthier machine gun (Indian Army use)

=== Grenades ===
- No.36 Mk I grenade (Standard issue grenade, Fragmentation rifle, hand grenade, also known as the "Mills bomb")
- No.1 Mk.I Cup Discharger (Rifle grenade launcher for No.1 Mk III rifle)
- Mk.2 fragmentation hand grenade (British Malaya)
- No.68 anti-tank grenade (HEAT anti-tank rifle grenade)
- No.69 Mk.I grenade (Concussion hand grenade)
- No.73 anti-tank grenade (Also known as the "Thermos grenade")
- No.74 anti-tank hand grenade (Also known as the "Sticky bomb")
- No.75 anti-tank hand grenade (Also known as the "Hawkins grenade")
- No.76 special incendiary grenade (Phosphorus hand grenade)
- No.77 grenade (White phosphorus hand grenade)
- No.82 hand grenade (Also known as the "Gammon bomb")
- Type 97 grenade (British Malaya)
- Molotov fire grenade (improvised weapon, British Malaya)

=== Obstacle clearing explosive charges ===
- McClintock Bangalore torpedo

=== Flamethrowers ===
- Flamethrower, Portable, No 2 "Lifebuoy"

=== Mortars ===
- SBML 2-inch mortar (Light mortar)
- ML 3-inch mortar (Main mortar)

=== Anti-tank weapons ===
- M1 Bazooka
- Projector, Infantry, Anti-tank (PIAT)
- Boys Mk I anti-tank rifle

== United States of America ==
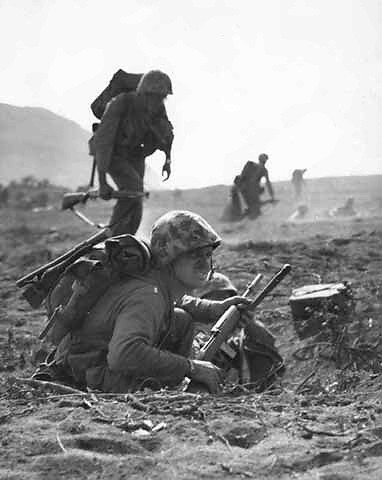
A U.S. Marine armed with a M1 carbine rifle and another with the Winchester M1912 shotgun

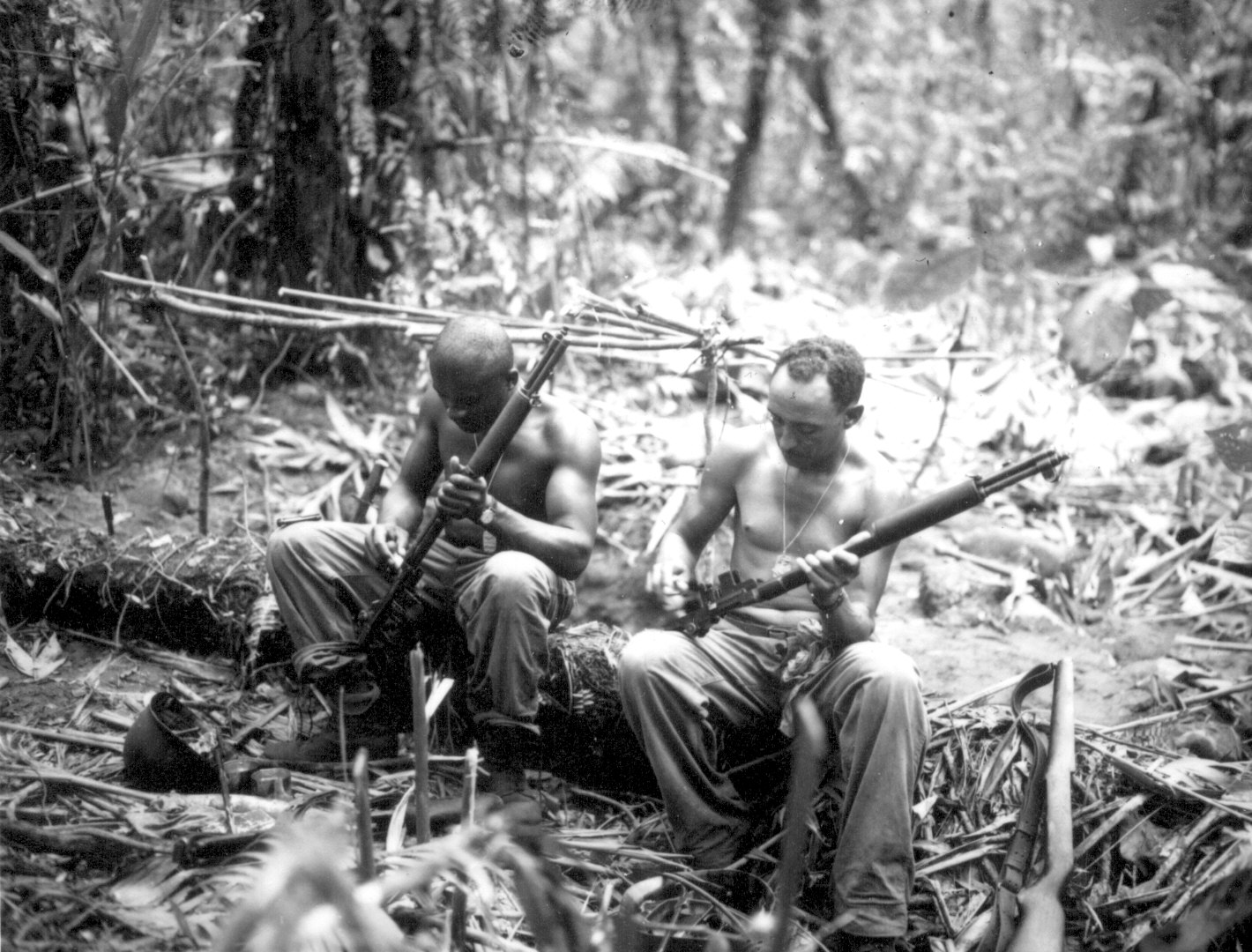
Two U.S. soldiers with M1 Garand rifles

=== Blade weapons ===
- Ka-Bar knife (standard issued melee weapon of the USMC)
- M1 bayonet
- M3 fighting knife
- M4 bayonet
- M1905 bayonet
- M1917 bayonet
- M1942 bayonet
- Mark I trench knife
- United States Marine Raider stiletto
- Bowie knife

=== Sidearms ===
- Colt M1911A1 (Standard-issued pistol of the US army)
- Browning High-Power (produced by Remington Arms and John Inglis from design plans from escaped Belgian workers, not very commonly issued to frontline troops.)
- High Standard HDM (used by OSS agents)
- Colt M1903 Pocket Hammerless (used by Police and OSS)
- M1917 Revolver produced by Colt and Smith & Wesson
- Colt M1927 Official Police (Also known as Colt M1927 Commando)
- Smith & Wesson Military & Police

=== Shotguns ===
Commonly used by the United States Marine Corps in the Pacific theater, limited use in Europe.

- Winchester M1912 (Also used to the Western Front, standard-issued shotgun of the US Army)
- Winchester M1897 (2nd most preferred shotgun of US Marines, This weapon is the standard issued of the US army in WWI. After WWI this weapon is superseded by the M1912 and large number sold it to the US law enforcement became the standard issued shotgun of the US police. Some of it still use in WW2)
- Browning Auto-5 & Remington Model 11 & Savage Model 720 (The Model 11 is the Remington manufactured A5 shotgun with short barrel. Issued only as emergency weapon)
- Remington M10-A
- Stevens M520-30 and M620
- Ithaca 37

=== Submachine guns ===
- Thompson submachine gun (Standard-issued SMG of the US army, various variants used by Army and Marine Corps, M1A1 variant is the standard issue)
- M3 'Grease Gun' (M3 variant was the main variant used during the war. Introduced as low cost replacement for Thompson, but never completely replaced it.)
- M50/M55 Reising (used by USMC 1941–1943 in the Pacific, and supplied as Lend-Lease to USSR and other countries)
- United Defense M42 (supplied to resistance and partisan groups, also issued to some OSS members, but not in great quantities.)

=== Automatic Rifles ===
- M2 Carbine (limited use late war such as during the battle of Okinawa in the pacific)
- Browning M1918 (This variant is a battle rifle due to its capability of semi and fully automatic fire and its lack of bipod.)

=== Rifles ===
- M1 Garand (standard issue rifle)
- Springfield M1903A1 (Original model manufactured by Springfield)
- M1 Carbine
- M1A1 Carbine (paratrooper version of the M1 Carbine with folding stock)
- Remington M1903A3 (Remington manufactured Springfield M1903 rifle used by Marines early in the pacific, phased out by M1 Carbine and M1 Garand)
- Enfield M1917 (used in Ceremonial and training use.)
- Johnson M1941 rifle (used mainly by the Marine Raiders and Paramarines)

=== Sniper rifles ===
- M1C Garand (adopted in 1944. Plausible very limited use on Pacific. Never recorded any combat use in Europe)
- Springfield M1903A1 (with Unertl 7.8x Scope, USMC variants had an 8.0x scope)
- Remington M1903A4 (Remington manufactured Springfield M1903 rifle with M84 or M73B1 Scope)
- Winchester Model 70 (Very limited and unofficial use on the Pacific)

=== Machine guns ===
- Browning M1918A2 (This variant is a light machine gun due to it having a bipod and being uncapable of semi-automatic fire. Standard-issued LMG of the US army as the squad automatic weapon)
- Browning M1919A4 & A6 (Medium machine gun. US army main fire support weapon)
- Browning M2HB (Heavy machine gun)
- Browning M1917A1 (Heavy machine gun. Commonly used by USMC)
- M1941 Johnson (Light machine gun. Issued to FSSF and Paramarines)
- M2 Stinger (used only in the Battle of Iwo Jima. Very limited use)

=== Grenades ===
- Mk II & Mk2A1 Hand Grenades (Early war grenades were painted yellow, standard issued hand grenade of the US army)
- Frangible Grenade M1 (Molotov cocktail)
- MK3 grenade
- AN-M8 smoke grenade
- AN-M14 Incendiary
- M15 Smoke WP
- M18 Smoke Grenade

=== Grenade launchers ===
- M1 grenade adapter
- M7 grenade launcher (M1 Garand attachment)
- M8 grenade launcher (M1 Carbine attachment)
- M9 rifle grenade (anti-tank rifle grenade)
- M17 rifle grenade

=== Obstacle clearing explosive charges ===
- M1A1 Bangalore torpedo

=== Flamethrowers ===
- M1 & M1A1 flamethrowers (first combat use in January 1943)
- M2 flamethrower (introduced in summer 1944)

=== Mortars ===
- M1 mortar
- M2 mortar
- M2 4.2-inch mortar

=== Anti-tank weapons ===
- M1A1 and M9 Bazooka rocket launcher
- M18 recoilless rifle (Extremely limited usage possibly in Europe to fight against Panthers and other AFVs)

== Kingdom of Yugoslavia ==
=== Sidearms ===
- M1895 Nagant Revolver
- M1910/22 (Main pistol. Designated as M.22)
- Modèle 1892 revolver (Provided by France after WW1)
- Ruby pistol (Provided by France after WW1)
- Rast-Gasser M1893 (WW1 stockpiles)
- Steyr M1912 (WW1 stockpiles)
- Beretta M1934 (captured)
- Luger P08 (captured)
- Walther P38 (captured)
- Tokarev TT-33 (Soviet aid)

=== Submachine guns ===
- Thompson submachine gun (American aid)
- United Defense M42 (American aid. Supplied by OSS)
- Sten submachine gun (British aid)
- Beretta M1938 (captured)
- Danuvia 39M (captured)
- ZK-383 (captured)
- Erma EMP-35
- Steyr-Solothurn MP 34 (captured)
- Bergmann MP35 (captured)
- MP 38 (captured)
- MP 40 (captured)
- MP 41
- PPSh-41 (Soviet aid)
- PPS-43 (Soviet aid)
- PPD-40 (Soviet aid)

=== Automatic rifles ===
- Sturmgewehr 44 (captured)

=== Rifles ===
- Mauser-Koka
- Berthier rifle
- M1 Carbine (American aid)
- Lee–Enfield rifle (British aid)
- Lebel Model 1886/93 rifle
- Carcano rifle (captured & WW1 stockpiles)
- Serbian Mauser M1899 (derived from Mauser M1895) (shortened & rechambered to 7.92×57mm during interwar)
- Serbian Mauser M1899/07(08) carbine
- Serbian Mauser M1910 (derived from Gewehr 98)
- Yugo Mauser FN M1924 (standard rifle)
- Četnik carbine M1924 (in use for Četnik Assaulters)
- Kbk wz. 1929
- Steyr-Mannlicher M1895/24 (converted to Yugo FN Mauser 1924 standard)
- vz. 24
- Gewehr 41 (captured)
- Gewehr 43 (captured)
- Mauser Gewehr 98 (captured)
- Mauser Karabiner 98k (captured)
- Mosin-Nagant

=== Light Machine guns ===
- ZB vz. 26 (Bought 1500 light machine guns)
- ZB vz. 30J (Standard LMG. Produced under license and bought in 1936)
- Chauchat M1915/26 (chambered in 7.9×57mm m1888)
- Madsen machine gun
- Breda M1930 (captured)
- MG 34 (captured)
- MG 42 (captured)
- Bren machine gun (British aid)

=== Medium Machine guns ===
- Hotchkiss M1914
- Schwarzlose 1912/26 mg (chambered in 7.92)
- ZB-53

=== Heavy Machine guns ===
- PM M1910
- ZB 60 HMG
- Breda M1937 (captured)
- DShK (Soviet aid)

=== Grenades ===
- Vasić M12
- M38 offensive/defensive grenade
- M35 offensive/defensive grenade
- M1924 Stielhandgranate (captured)
- M1939 Eierhandgranate (captured)

=== Mortars ===
- Yugoslav Brandt 27/31 (31/38)
- Granatnik wz 36

=== Flamethrowers ===
- Abwehrflammenwerfer 42 (captured)
- Schilt portable flamethrower

=== Anti-tank weapons ===
- M1 Bazooka (American aid)
- PIAT (British aid)
- Boys anti-tank rifle (British aid)
- Panzerfaust (captured)
- Panzerschreck (captured)
- M1933 anti-tank rifle

== Non-aligned volunteers ==
Several countries remained officially neutral or non-belligerent during World War II but still provided volunteer formations that participated in the conflict. The most notable examples were Swedish volunteers who fought alongside Finland during the Winter War and the Spanish Blue Division which served with Nazi Germany on the Eastern Front (World War II).

=== Sidearms ===
- Walther PP (Swedish service and police pistol)
- Lahti L-35 (Swedish volunteers and Finnish forces)
- Luger P08 (Spanish Blue Division)
- Astra 400 (Spanish service pistol)
- Astra 600 (Spanish service pistol)

=== Submachine Guns ===
- MP-28 "Avispero" (Spanish forces)
- MP 40 (Spanish Blue Division, supplied by Germany)
- Thompson M1928 (Swedish volunteers)
- Suomi KP/-31 (Swedish volunteers serving in Finland)
- Erma EMP (Spanish forces)

=== Rifles ===
- Mauser Model 1893 (Spanish standard rifle)
- Gewehr 98 (Spanish forces and reserve units)
- Mannlicher M1895 (Spanish forces)
- Mosin–Nagant (Swedish volunteers in Finland)
- Mauser m/1896 (Swedish Army)
- Mauser m/1938 (Swedish Army)

=== Machine Guns ===
- Maxim MG (Spanish forces)
- Chauchat (Spanish Civil War veterans and reserve weapons)
- Madsen M1907 & M1922 (Spanish forces)
- Hotchkiss M1922 (Spanish forces)
- Kulspruta m/1914 (Swedish Army)
- M1918 Browning automatic rifle (Swedish volunteers)
- Kulspruta m/1900 (Swedish Army)
- Kulspruta m/39 (Swedish Army)
- Madsen M1906, M1914, & M1921 (Swedish Army)
- Hotchkiss M1909 (Swedish Army)
- M1919 Browning machine gun (Spanish and Swedish use)
- DP-27 (Swedish volunteers in Finland)
- Lahti-Saloranta M/26 (Swedish volunteers in Finland)
- MG 42 (Spanish Blue Division, supplied by Germany)

== See also ==
- German designations of foreign artillery in World War II
- German designations of foreign firearms in World War II
- List of World War II firearms of Germany
- List of World War II weapons
- Lists of World War II military equipment
- Specifications for World War II infantry weapons
- List of secondary and special-issue World War II infantry weapons
- List of prototype World War II infantry weapons

== Bibliography ==
- David Miller. (2003). "The illustrated directory of 20th-century guns". Minneapolis, Minnesota: Zenith Imprint. ISBN 9780760315606.
- James H. Willbanks. (2004). "Machine guns: An illustrated history of their impact". Santa Barbara, California: ABC-CLIO. ISBN 1851094806.
- Jeff Kinard. (2004). "Pistols: An illustrated history of their impact". Santa Barbara, California: ABC-CLIO. ISBN 1851094709.
- John Walterll. (2006)."The rifle story: An illustrated history from 1756 to the present day". Norwalk, Connecticut: MBI Publishing company. ISBN 9781853676901.
- Robert W.D. Ball. (2011). "Mauser military rifles of the world". Iola, Wisconsin: New York City, New York: F+W Media, Inc. ISBN 9781440228803.
- Wayne Zwoll. (2003). "Bolt action rifles". Iola, Wisconsin: Krause publications. ISBN 1440224064.
