= Type 93 =

Type 93 may refer to:

- Type 93 air-to-ship missile, a modern Japanese missile
- Type 93 armoured car, a Japanese WWII armored car
- Type 93 flamethrower, a Japanese WWII flamethrower
- Type 93 heavy machine gun, a Japanese WWII heavy machine gun
- Type 93 mine, a Japanese WWII anti-tank mine
- Type 93 surface-to-air missile, a modern Japanese missile
- Type 93 torpedo, a Japanese WWII torpedo
- Type 93 150 mm infantry mortar, a Japanese WWII 150mm mortar
- Type 93 mortar, a Chinese 60mm mortar
- AMES Type 93 – Plessey AR-320
