= Liekinheitin M/44 =

- Type: Underbarrel Flamethrower
- Place of origin: Finland

Service history
- In service: 1944-1970
- Used by: Finnish Army
- Wars: World War II; Continuation War; Lapland War

Production history
- Designer: Sergeant M. Kuusinen
- Designed: 1944

Specifications
- Effective firing range: 12 - 15 metres

The Liekinheitin M/44 was an underbarrel flamethrower used by the Finnish army near the end of World War II.

== History ==
During the Winter War and the Continuation War, the Finnish Army used Italian Model 40 (designated as the Liekinheitin M/40 by the finns) flamethrowers and captured Soviet flamethrowers. The Liekinheitin M/44 was designed by Sergeant M. Kuusinen in 1944. He attached the flame tube of a flamethrower to the under barrel of a Suomi KP/-31, Finland's standard issue submachine gun. This turned the Suomi into a combination weapon that could act as both a submachine gun and a flamethrower so the operator wouldn't have to rely for assistance of other soldiers so much for covering fire. Since the M/44 was designed to be attached to the under barrel of a regular Suomi KP/-31, it was less costly to produce and it did not require any changes to other existing equipment. One is example is on display at the Finnish Military Museum in Helsinki.

== Performance ==
A prototype of the M/44 was approved for further development after successful presentation to the Finnish Armed Forces in April 1944. A small series was produced for troop trials with positive feedback, although its limited range was criticized. The Finnish Army initially ordered 100 M/44s, but only around 40 were completed by the delivery date of July 15, 1944. A few units were kept for training purposes by border guards until the 1970s.
