= Granát vz.34 =

- Type: Hand grenade
- Place of origin: Czechoslovakia

Service history
- Wars: World War II

Specifications
- Mass: 240g
- Height: 76mm
- Diameter: 64mm
- Effective firing range: 13m (25m when using fragmentation jacket)
- Detonation mechanism: Impact igniter

The Granát vz.34, or the RG vz.34, was a hand grenade created in Czechoslovakia in 1934 and used during World War II. The grenade was originally produced for the First Republic, but was given to the army after the war. There was one variant of the grenade, referred as the ORG vz.38. The grenade was made from thin sheet metal, but the revised version had thicker metal and was connected by an internal thread, so that the body was smooth. The only difference between the 38 and the 34 was the amount and size of shrapnel.

== Trigger ==
The model 34 hand grenade had an impact reaction fuze. It weighs 350g and had 4 main parts:

- The body of the grenade
- The fuze
- The cartridge
- The fuse

When the ring is turned to 90° to either side, it breaks the wire, so that the ring can be removed. After throwing it, the safety is released and upon impact, the inertia from the buckling overcomes the firing pin and the needle pierces the fuze, which causes the explosion.

== See also ==
- 3,7cm KPÚV vz. 34
