= Shaving Stick Grenade =

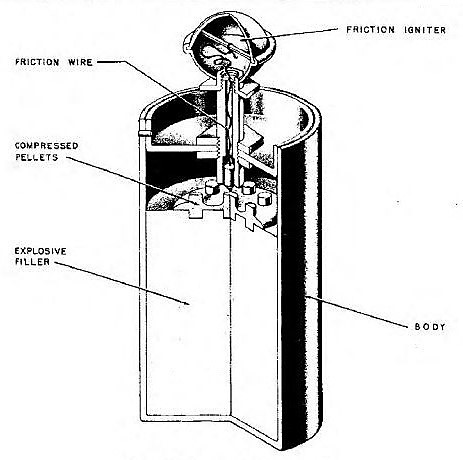
- Type: Offensive grenade
- Place of origin: Germany

Service history
- Used by: Wehrmacht
- Wars: World War II

Specifications
- Length: 76–102 mm (3–4 in)
- Diameter: 51 mm (2 in)
- Detonation mechanism: B.Z.E friction igniter 4-5 second delay

The Shaving Stick Grenade was an offensive grenade that was developed by Germany and used by the Wehrmacht during World War II.

== Design ==
The German designation for this grenade is unknown. It consists of a 3 5/8-inch or 4-inch aluminum body which is painted yellow and filled with explosives. It is intended for use as an offensive grenade so fragmentation is minimal relying instead on the blast effect. In this role, it was fitted with a B.Z.E friction igniter like most other German hand grenades. To use the cap at the end of the grenade was unscrewed and a cord inside the cap fell out. When the cap was pulled a delay was ignited which detonated the grenade after 4-5 seconds. The grenade could also be used as a booby trap with a D.Z. 35 pressure igniter.

== Gallery ==
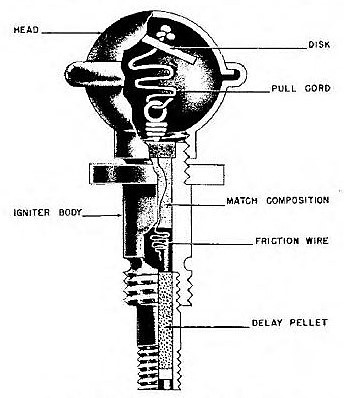
B.Z.E friction igniter.

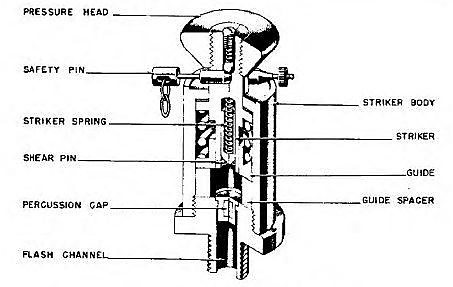
D.Z. 35 pressure igniter.
