= Danish 1865/97 revolver =

- Type: Revolver
- Place of origin: Denmark

Service history
- Wars: World War II

Production history
- Produced: 1897-1899
- No. built: 952

The Danish 1865/97 revolver was a revolver used in the Danish armed forces from 1897 to 1946 as a reserve sidearm not distributed to frontline infantry and instead given to other military units like the artillery who otherwise would not have firearms for self defence.

== Origins ==
The 1865/97 Danish revolver was the 1865 Danish pinfire revolver converted to Centrefire. The original 1865 Danish revolver was the first revolver of the Danish military and so its first repeating side arm. The revolver itself was designed by the gunsmith Georg Christensen stepson of another gunsmith Löbenitz. Georg Christensen ran the gun shop at St. Kongensgade 33 that he inherited from his stepfather. The gun shop was only small being a shop so the model 1865 revolver he designed was mass manufactured at the Kronberg Gevaerfabrik where his stepfather used to work. Approximately 1,000 model 1865 revolvers were manufactured. The revolver was in a 12mm calibre and used pinfire ammo. In the 1880s new revolvers entered service with the Danish army that made the model 1865 obsolete and the revolvers were held in reserve at Kjøbenhavns Tøjhus.

== Conversion ==
The reserve 1865 revolvers were still used by parts of the Danish military that could not get guns otherwise like artillerymen. This led to them being updated in 1897 at where they were held at Kjøbenhavns Tøjhus by converting the model 1865 pinfire revolver to centrefire creating the model 1865/97 centrefire revolver. The new centrefire bullets used in the new 1865/97 revolver had a uniquely Danish design with a wooden core and nickel casing and was in .45 calibre (roughly around 11.5 mm). During the conversion a trigger guard was added and the folding trigger on the gun locked in place. Out of the 1000 model 1865 revolvers available to the Danish military 850 were converted to 1865/97 models in 1897. In 1899 52 more revolvers were converted to 1865/97 models except the folding trigger remained unchanged. These were shipped to the West Indies (most probably to the Danish colony there). Leading to a total of 952 1865 model revolvers being converted to 1865/97 model out of the 1000 originally available to the Danish military.

== Service ==
A number of sources said that these revolvers served with Danish artillery units in their time of service(1897-1946).

== See also ==
- Forgotten Weapons video on the gun
- Lefaucheux M1858 pinfire revolver
