= Lanciafiamme Modello 35 =

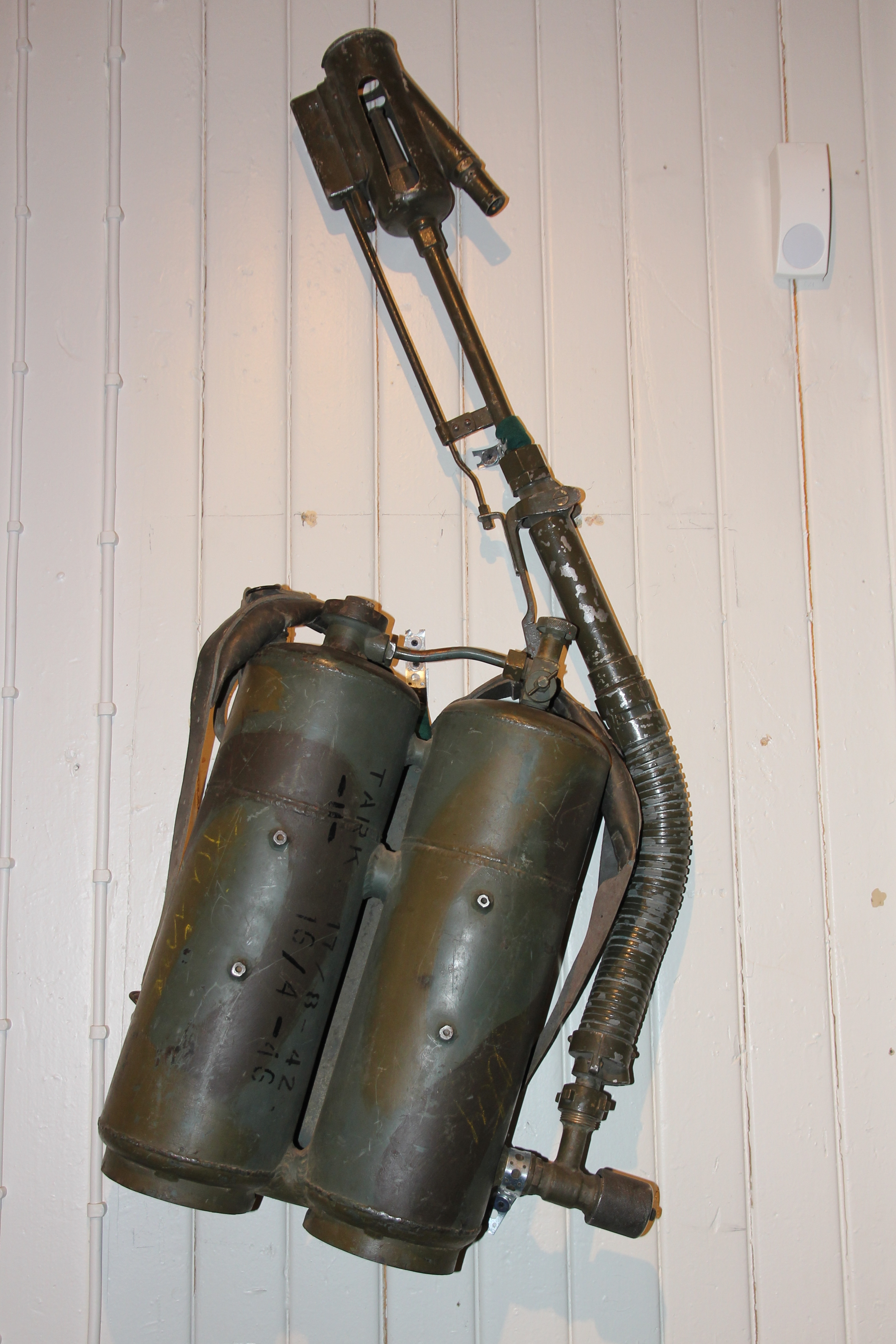
- Type: Flamethrower
- Place of origin: Italy

Service history
- In service: 1935-1945
- Used by: Royal Italian Army; Finland
- Wars: Second Italo-Ethiopian War; Spanish Civil War; Winter War; World War II

Production history
- Designed: 1935
- Manufacturer: Servizio Chimico Militare
- No. built: 1,500

Specifications
- Mass: 27 kg (60 lb) full, 10 kg (22 lb) empty
- Effective firing range: 20 m (66 ft)

The Lanciafiamme Spalleggiato Modello 35, also known as the Model 35, was a flamethrower issued to the Royal Italian Army in the Second Italo-Ethiopian War. In 1940 it was replaced by the Lanciafiamme Spalleggiato Modello 40, (Note: Official denomination taken from Istruzione per l'addestramento e l'impiego di unità lanciafiamme, Direzione del Servizio Chimico Militare, Ministero della Guerra, 1943.) which used a different ignition system.

== History ==
The Model 35 was adopted by the Italian Army in 1935. Units were assigned to a "Flamethrower platoon". Each of three squads, which consisted of six sections, were assigned two weapons. In 1939, 176 copies of this model were sold to the Finnish Army, who used the renamed Lanciafiamme M/40 against the Red Army during the Winter War. During the Second World War, the Model 35 was issued to a division on the Greek-Albanian front. The newer Model 40, which replaced the Model 35 as the Italian Army's principal flamethrower in 1940, was issued mostly to the Italian corps. The Model 40 was employed largely in the North African campaign against the British and with Italian units in Russia.

The Model 35 was heavier than its contemporaries and had inferior performance to those weapons, having a shorter range than the equivalent German weapon.

== Model 35 ==
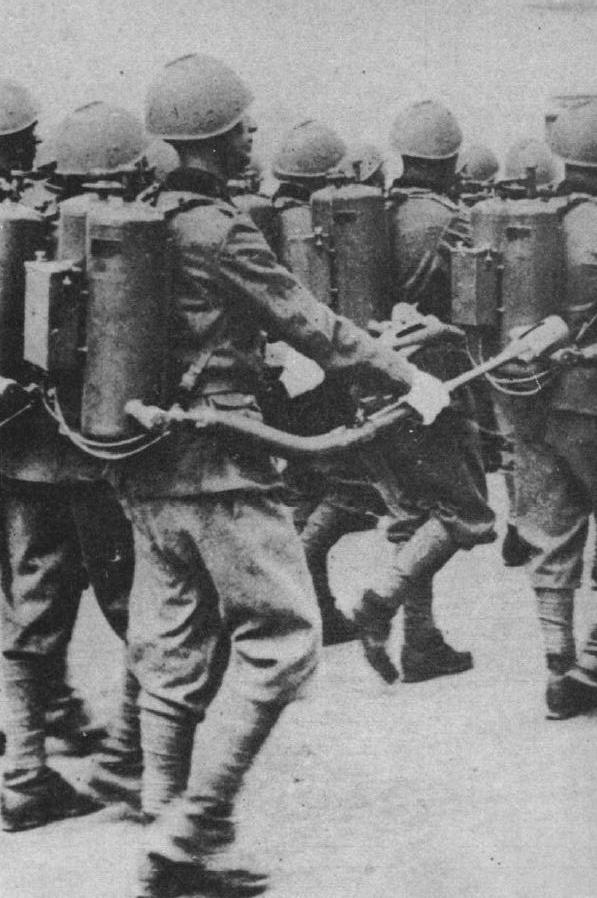
Italian soldiers armed with the Flamethrower Model 35 on parade. The quadrangular box structure contains the batteries of the ignition system.

The Model 35 had three major elements: the tank, the lance and the ignition system.

The tank was carried via two transport belts and padded back. It was composed of two cylinders. Each was divided internally into two parts by a metal diaphragm. The two upper sections were linked together and could hold 6 litres of nitrogen at a pressure of 20 atmospheres, which acted as a propellant. The lower halves were also connected and contained 12 litres of fuel, a mixture composed of 9 parts diesel oil and 1 part gasoline. Both substances were loaded from special openings on the upper end of the cylinders, where a manual valve conveyed the liquid nitrogen in the tank to pressurize them at the moment of use. The filler pipe coupling of the lance was located in the lower part of the tank, beside the right cylinder.

The lance has a control lever (of lightweight alloy) that connects to the tank through a hose. At the muzzle of the lance, a large flange ("cartoccia") has a double ignition system. The main system was initially made of two sharpening sheets of steel, with flint and rollers to create sparks from friction, actuated by the control lever. It was later replaced by an electrical system: a square box, placed behind the cylinders housed an 18 volt battery with a dynamo for manual recharging. Two electric cables run up the lance to the flange, each serving as a spark plug similar to that of a car. The spark ignited the jet of gas that poured from the lance. A secondary system consists of the "bengalotto," a slow-burning pyrotechnic device that is manually ignited and mounted on the weapons sight, burning for 2 minutes. On the passage of the flammable liquid, operated by the lever on the lance, it launched a dart of up to 20 meters range, which produced a heat zone 35 meters wide and 15 deep. The "bengalotto," however, though simple and reliable, was prone to revealing the user's position to enemy forces.

The weapon was carried by two soldiers, flammieri, protected by fireproof vests. The system, due to its weight and the overall dimensions of the fireproof suit, could be carried only for short distances. It was normally transported on trucks or on special donkey saddle. The flammable liquid reserves allowed about 20 discharges. Recharging the weapon could take 20 minutes or more.

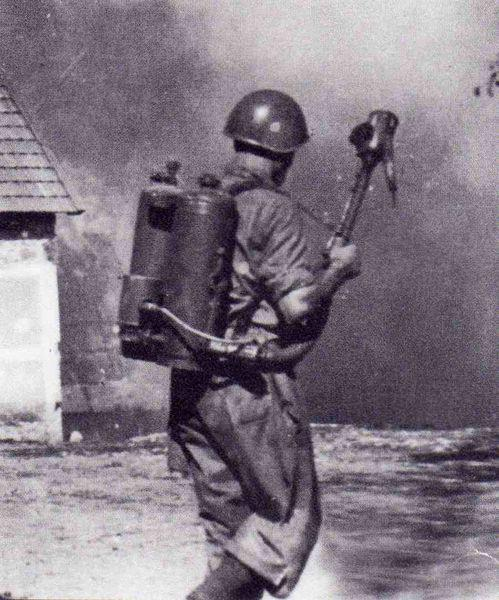
A Model 40, distinguishable from its predecessor by the cylindrical turbine container

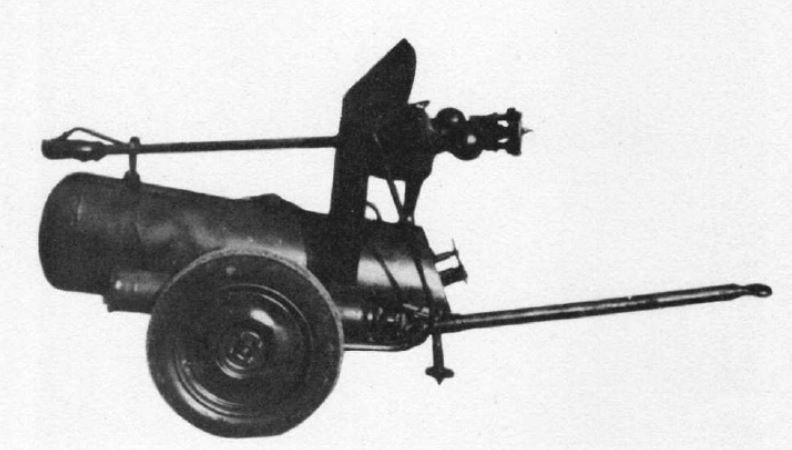
Model42 carrellato

== Model 40 ==
The Model 40 carried an improved electrical ignition system, based on a high-voltage magneto. This was activated by a turbine flow, set in motion by the pressurized flow of the liquid fuel at the time of launch. The electrical connection fed the spark plug and ignited the jet. The flange still retained the bengalotto tube as a secondary ignition system. Otherwise, major components of the weapon and its performance remained unchanged.

== Further development ==
The excessive weight of the system on the battlefield led to the development of the Lanciafiamme Mod. 41, which was lighter, with a slightly modified electrical system. For shock troops and paratroopers, a lighter version that could be held as a rifle was developed, called the Lanciafiamme Mod. 41 d'assalto. The Italian armed forces also used the Lanciafiamme Carrellato Model 42, a heavy model intended for engineers rather than assault troops.

== See also ==
- Flamethrower, Portable, No 2
- Flammenwerfer 35

== Bibliography ==
- Le armi della fanteria italiana nella seconda guerra mondiale, Nicola Pignato, Albertelli Ed., 1978.
- "Italian Portable Flame Thrower, Model 41", Tactical and Technical Trends, no. 34, United States Department of War, September 1943 – via Lonesentry
