= Type 93 150 mm infantry mortar =

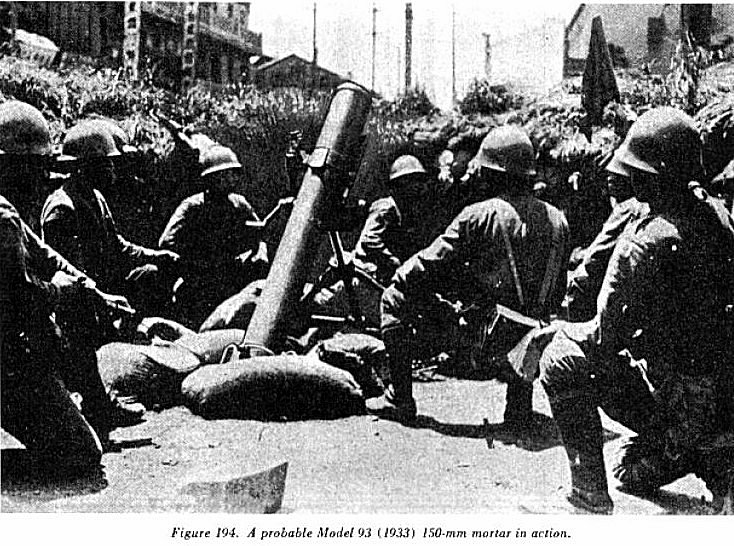
- A probable picture a Type 93 150 mm infantry mortar.
- Place of origin: Empire of Japan

Service history
- Used by: Imperial Japanese Army
- Wars: World War II

Specifications
- Mass: Barrel:110 kg (242 lb)
- Length: 1.63 m (5 ft 4 in)
- Caliber: 150 mm (5.9 in)
- Elevation: +43° to +80°
- Traverse: 7°
- Effective firing range: 2.1 km (1.3 mi)

The Type 93 150 mm infantry mortar was a medium infantry mortar used by the Imperial Japanese Army during World War II. The Type 93 designation was given to this mortar as it was accepted in the year 2593 of the Japanese calendar (1933).

== Design ==
Relatively little is known about this mortar other than it being a muzzle-loading smoothbore mortar which was fired by a lanyard instead of being drop fired. The Type 93 may have been a transitional model and only produced in small numbers. It is described as being meant for motor transport due to its weight but it lacked a wheeled carriage for towing and was difficult to move.

== Ammunition ==
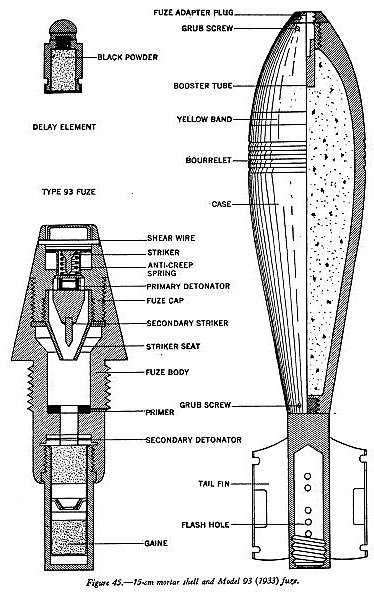
Type 93 15 cm projectile.

A Type 93 projectile analyzed during the war and was essentially a scaled up version of the Type 97 81 mm infantry mortar round. The body was made of machined cast steel and was threaded at the front for a nose fuze and at the rear for a finned tail. Five bourrelets were machined around the middle of the projectile that acted as a gas seal.

Type	Length	Weight	Explosive weight	Explosive type
High explosive	2 ft 5 in (74 cm)	25 kg (56 lb)	6.4 kg (14 lb)	TNT
