= M48 =

M48 or M-48 may refer to:

- Messier 48, an open star cluster in the constellation Hydra
- 48th known Mersenne prime
- M48 Patton, an American tank
- MIM-72A/M48 Chaparral, an American self-propelled surface-to-air missile system
- M-48 (Michigan highway), a state highway in Michigan
- M48 motorway, a motorway in Great Britain between England and Wales
- M48 (Cape Town), a Metropolitan Route in Cape Town, South Africa
- M48 (Johannesburg), a Metropolitan Route in Johannesburg, South Africa
- M48 Mauser, a Yugoslavian version of the Mauser K98 rifle
- 76 mm mountain gun M48, a Yugoslavian mountain gun
- Zastava M48, a post World War II Yugoslavian version of the German Karabiner 98k
