= Zastava M 98/48 =

Zastava M98/48
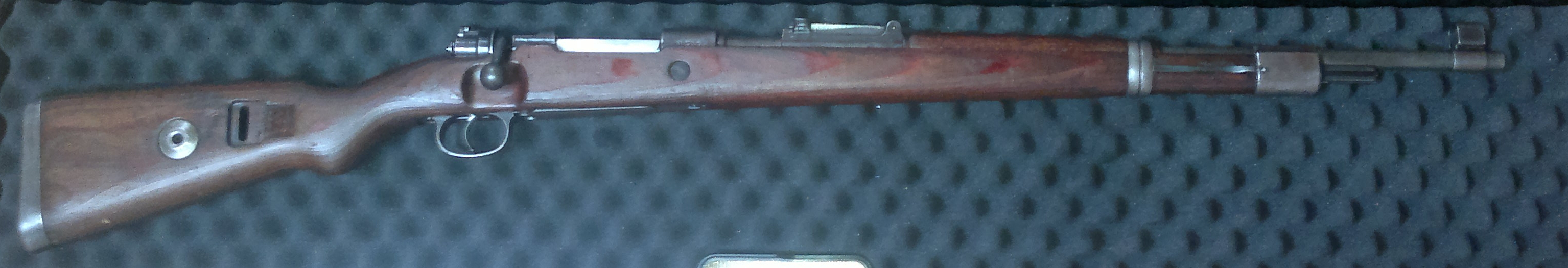
- Type: Bolt-action rifle
- Place of origin: Yugoslavia

Service history
- In service: 1946–present
- Used by: Yugoslavia; Croatia; Bosnia
- Wars: Yugoslav Wars

Production history
- Designed: 1935
- Manufacturer: Mauser, Zastava Arms
- Produced: 1946-early 1950s
- No. built: Unknown
- Variants: Mod.98/48

Specifications
- Mass: 3.7 kg (8.2 lb) – 4.1 kg (9.0 lb)
- Length: 1,110 mm (43.70 in)
- Barrel length: 610 mm (24.02 in)
- Cartridge: 8×57mm IS
- Action: Bolt action
- Muzzle velocity: 860 m/s (2,822 ft/s)
- Effective firing range: 500 m (550 yd) with iron sights 1000^{+} m (1093.6^{+} yd) with telescopic sight
- Feed system: 5-round stripper clip, internal magazine
- Sights: Iron sights or telescopic sight.

The Zastava M98/48 (often called Mod.98/48, Model. 98/48, Yugo K98k) is a bolt-action rifle chambered for 7.92×57mm, it was temporarily adopted in the years after World War II by the Yugoslav People's Army. This design was a refurbished Mauser Kar98k rifle that had been left-over by Germans or captured by partisans during World War II.

== History ==
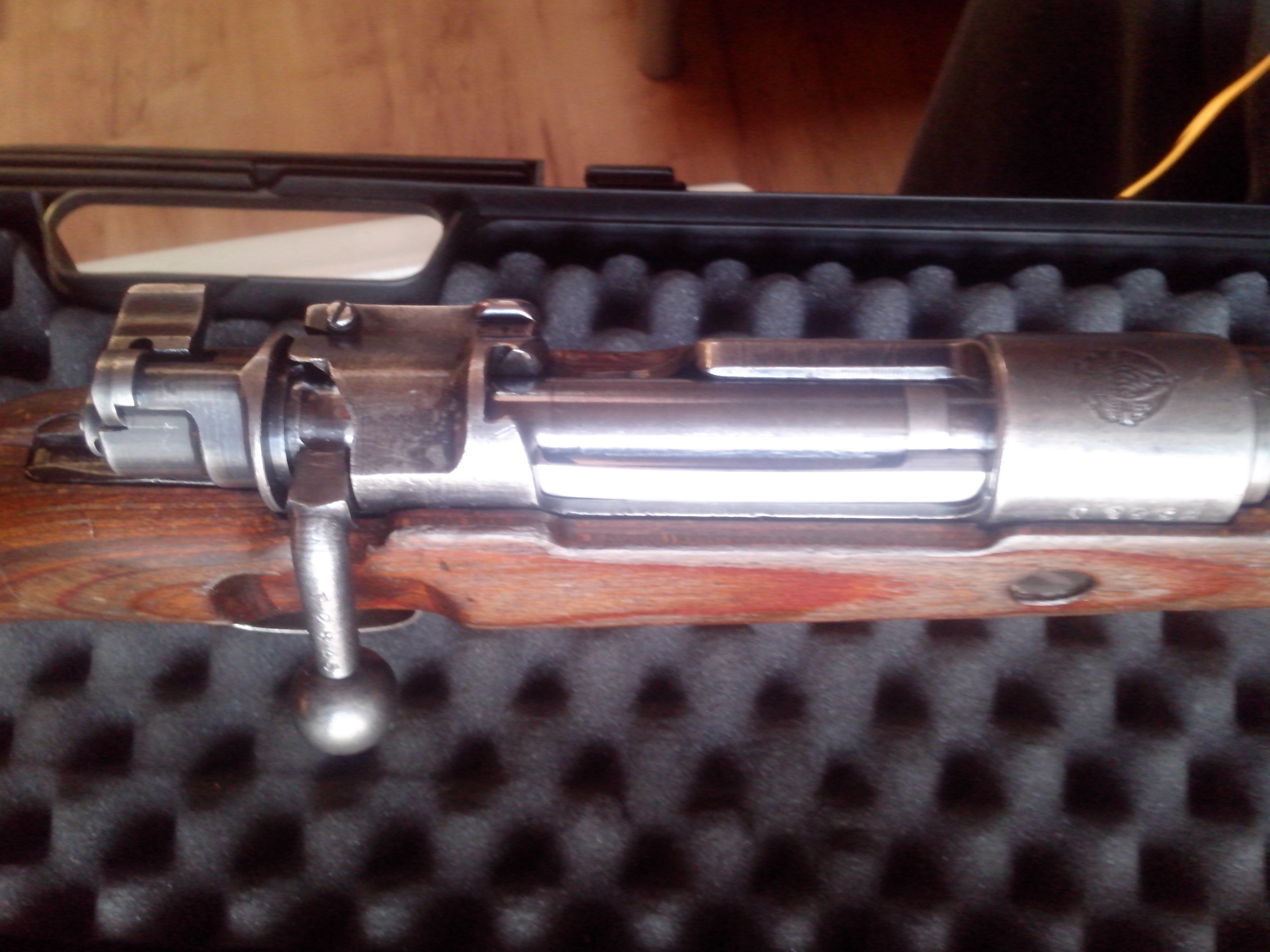
The picture shows the Mauser K98k action on the M98/48

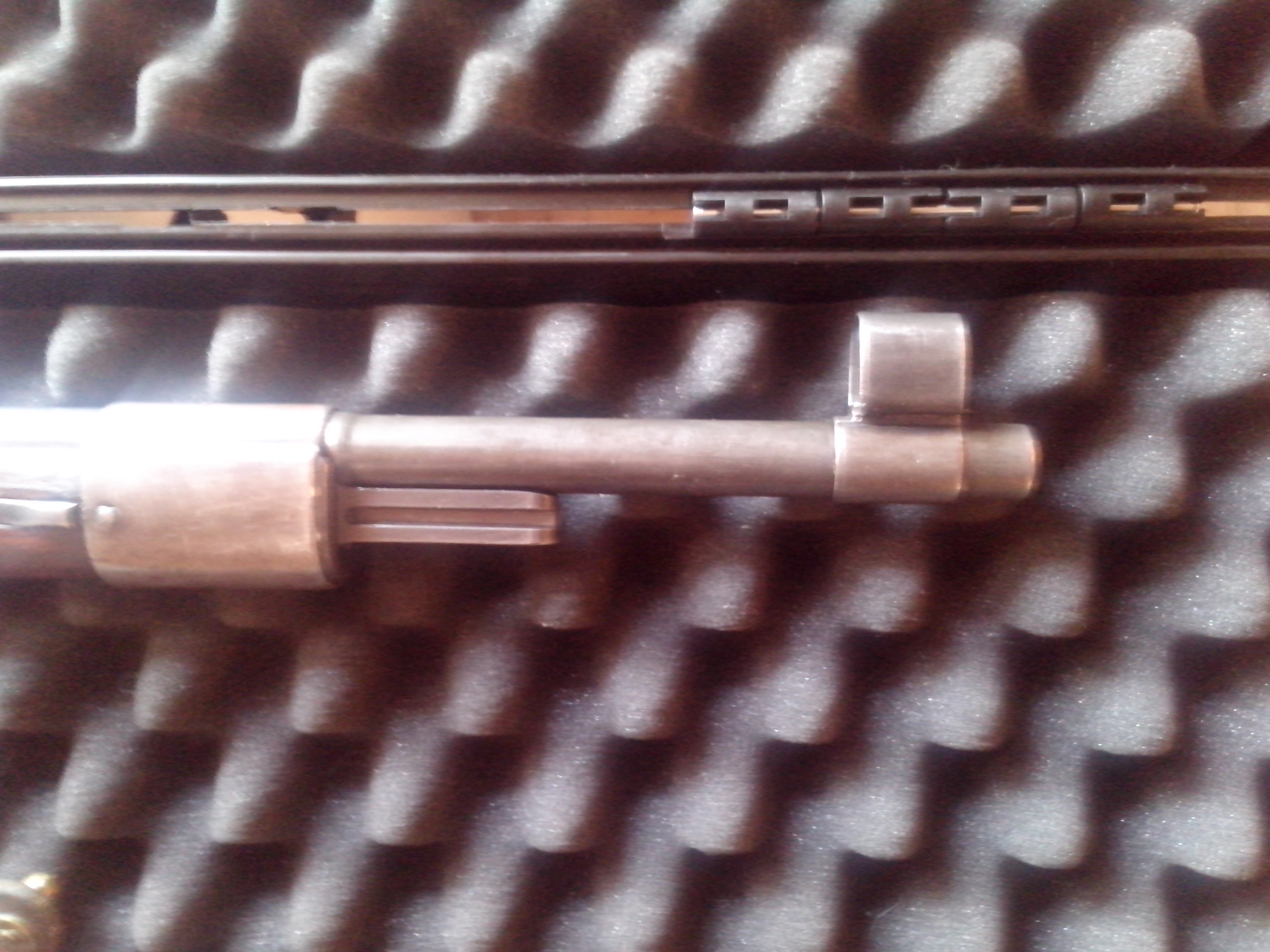
The picture shows the front sight ring, a feature that was mainly absent on the original Mauser K98k rifles.

Soon after World War II, the newly formed Socialist Federal Republic of Yugoslavia was trying to re-arm its military forces. The main problem that the Yugoslav government had to face was the lack of funds and the fear of an imminent conflict with the Soviet Union. The new post-war socialist government agreed to put aside some of the claims for German damages, instead receiving from the Western Allies captured parts, incomplete rifles, captured rifles and machinery still intact for production of Mauser arms. A temporary solution was found in refurbishing the rifles that were either captured by the Partisans or arrived from Western Europe. The project only took a few years, and by 1947 most of the war rifles had been inspected, repaired and turned over to the JNA. The Yugoslav factory was known to put out higher quality shooters versus then Soviets. Yugoslavia being a country that originally was a producer of Mauser rifles prior to WWI and WWII, skilled workers existed already. Yugo Mausers (captured) were noted for their reliability, great accuracy, effective range and would not require a new mass production plant - thanks to the fact that all the components of the rifles were already available. These rifles were never used extensively until they were warehoused, in 1948, as the newer Yugoslav-made Zastava M48 came into being. Some of these rifles were used in a sniper rifle role during the Yugoslav Wars of 1990s. The rifles have been adapted, through machining, to accept new locally made telescopic sights-the ZRAK series.

== Design details ==
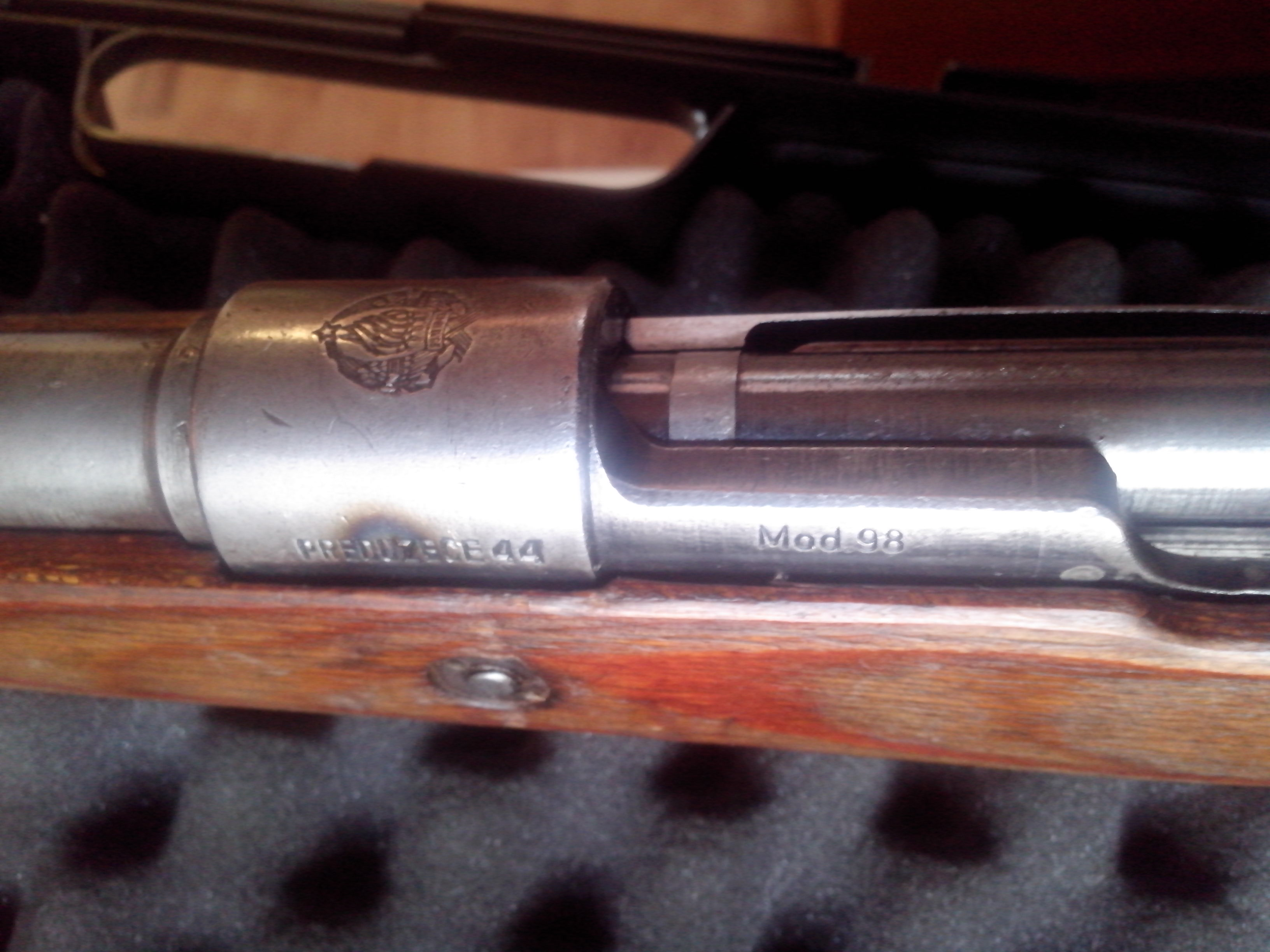
The picture shows Yugo markings on a refurbished k98k rifle.

These rifles are actually Karabiner 98k rifles that were left over by Germany or captured by Marshal Tito's partisan army, or Liberation Army. Despite the name of the rifles (which may lead to misunderstandings), the only difference between a German K98k and a Zastava M98/48 consists of the markings and the front barrel band. They are virtually identical to each other, since they are still the same rifles at their core.

== Markings ==
The original German markings were scrubbed and replaced by the Yugoslav ones. The most noticeable markings are the Yugoslav Crest and the "Preduzece 44"(It refers to the site where it was refurbished; for example "Preduzece 44" stands for "Institute 44"-Kragujevac, Serbia-the current location of Zastava Arms) present on the receiver's ring. Another noticeable marking is the one present on the left side of the receiver, the "Mod. 98/48". The "/48" is absent on all the rifles that have been refurbished before 1950. Many examples of M98/48s still have several visible (Often small) German waffen proof stamps on them.

== Users ==
=== Former users ===
- Bosnia and Herzegovina
- Croatia
- Iraq
- Yugoslavia: Passed on to successor states.
