= Seitengewehr 42 =

WWII German knife and bayonet

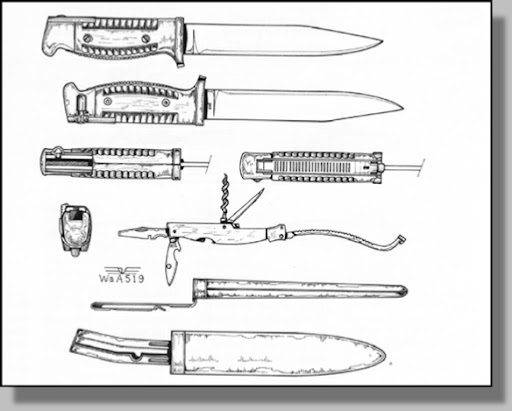

The Seitengewehr 42 (bayonet model 1942), also called the Infanteriemesser 42 or Kampfmesser 42, was a bayonet and multi-purpose knife used by the Wehrmacht.

== History ==
The Seitengewehr 42 was developed in 1942 by Wilhelm Gustloff Werke and manufactured by Carl Eickhorn in Solingen. According to its description, the Gustloff Company and its chief designer, Carl Barnitzke, got a German patent 766198 in October 1942 for an Armeemesser (Army knife) according to its description. The SG 42 was intended to supplement and later replace the original S84/98 III bayonet of the Karabiner 98k service rifle. The Seitengewehr 42 was designed as a multi-tool combat knife, but could also be mounted as a bayonet on the Karabiner 98k. The S84/98 III bayonet itself was a proven design, but there was a shortage of utility knives in the German military, which were usually procured privately.

After the consistently positive reception of several hundred pieces in the 1943 troops trials, the production was approved by Adolf Hitler, but this should take place because of the cost of a conversion of production until after the war. In 1944, an order for 10,000 pieces was issued by the Heereswaffenamt (Army Weapons Office). Factory production was started, but due to the end of the war, factories delivered only a small number. SG 42s were manufactured by Waffenfabrik Carl Eickhorn in Solingen and toolkits by Robert Klaas of Solingen.

== Technical specifications ==
Production largely made the SG 42 from stamped sheet metal parts. The handle scales and sheath are inexpensive and quickly produced, molded phenolic resin parts. The blade length was 179.5 mm (7.07 in), the total length was 304 mm (12.0 in) (317 mm (12.5 in) with sheath). The blade had a fuller. The knife contained a detachable toolkit in the handle that individuals could use for rifle maintenance and other tasks. The toolkit included a screwdriver, small knife, awl, and a corkscrew. The protective bracket of the handle served as a cartridge case extractor.

Analogous to the development of this knife bayonet after WWII, a worldwide development of the bayonet as a mere cutting and stabbing weapon to the plantable utility knife (saw, wire cutter) started. The Sudanese bayonet for the post-war ArmaLite AR-10 battle rifle was an adaptation of the SG 42 with only slight alterations.
