= Seitengewehr 98 =

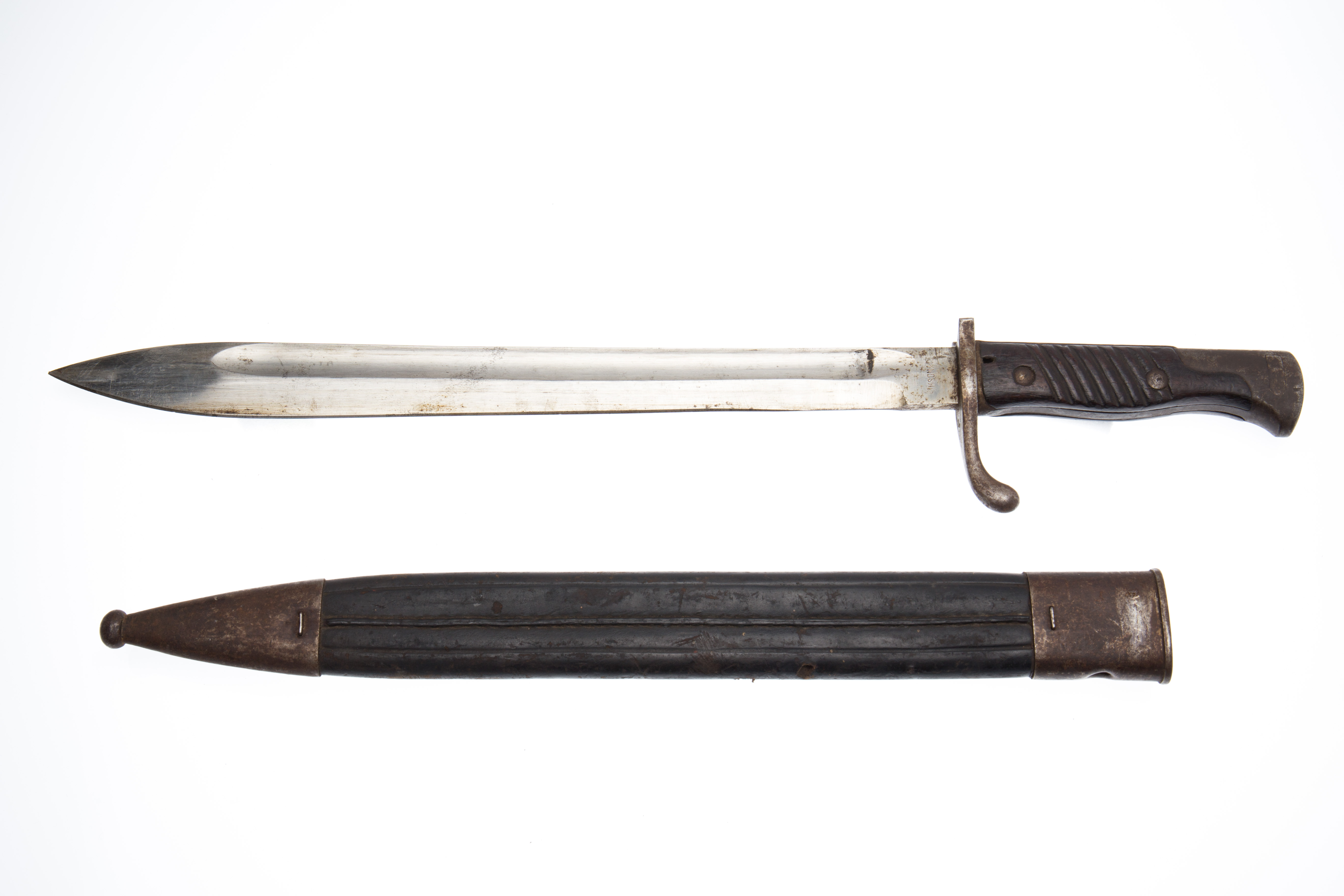
- Seitengewehr 98/05
- Type: Bayonet
- Place of origin: German Empire

Specifications
- Length: 650 mm (25.6 in)
- Blade length: 530 mm (20.9 in)

The Seitengewehr 98 (lit. 'sidearm') is a bayonet used with the Gewehr 98 rifle by Germany.

== History ==
The Seitengewehr 98 was designed in response to the French Épée-Baïonnette Modèle 1886.

== Description ==
The Seitengewehr 98 is a bayonet that accompanies the Gewehr 98, a German bolt-action rifle made by Mauser.

It was superseded by the short-lived Seitengewehr 98/02, with a shorter and sturdier 44 cm (17 in) blade.

Seitengewehr 98/05 followed shortly, with a still-substantial 37 cm (15 in) blade.

== Design ==
All Mauser bayonets attached via a T-shaped bar fitted under the barrel. Although many bayonets of the time used a muzzle ring, Mauser avoided one since these altered the vibration harmonics of the barrel when fired, affecting accuracy.

All the bayonets featured quillons that curved back towards the hilt. These were much less effective at catching the opposing blade than the forward-swept quillons used by some other nations.

A small number of pioneers and certain non-commissioned officers of the German Army were issued a bayonet with a sawback edge, known as the S or m.S. (German: mit Sag, lit. 'with saw'). Many such bayonets had their teeth ground down in response to negative Allied propaganda.

Some WW1 German bayonets had markings on the spine, on top a crown with a "W" under it and under that the last 2 digits of the year it was made in. It is balanced right in front of the guard.

The first model had a grip made of one single piece of wood, which was wrapped around the tang. This is called a.A. which means "old type" (German: alte Art). At the turn of the century the Germans simplified and strengthened their bayonet grips. The new type is called n.A. (German: neue Art) and the grip was made of two halves from wood. The two-piece grips were introduced in 1902.

== Users ==
- German Empire
- Weimar Republic
- Nazi Germany

== See also ==
- S84/98 III bayonet
