= Karabiner 98k =

German bolt-action rifle

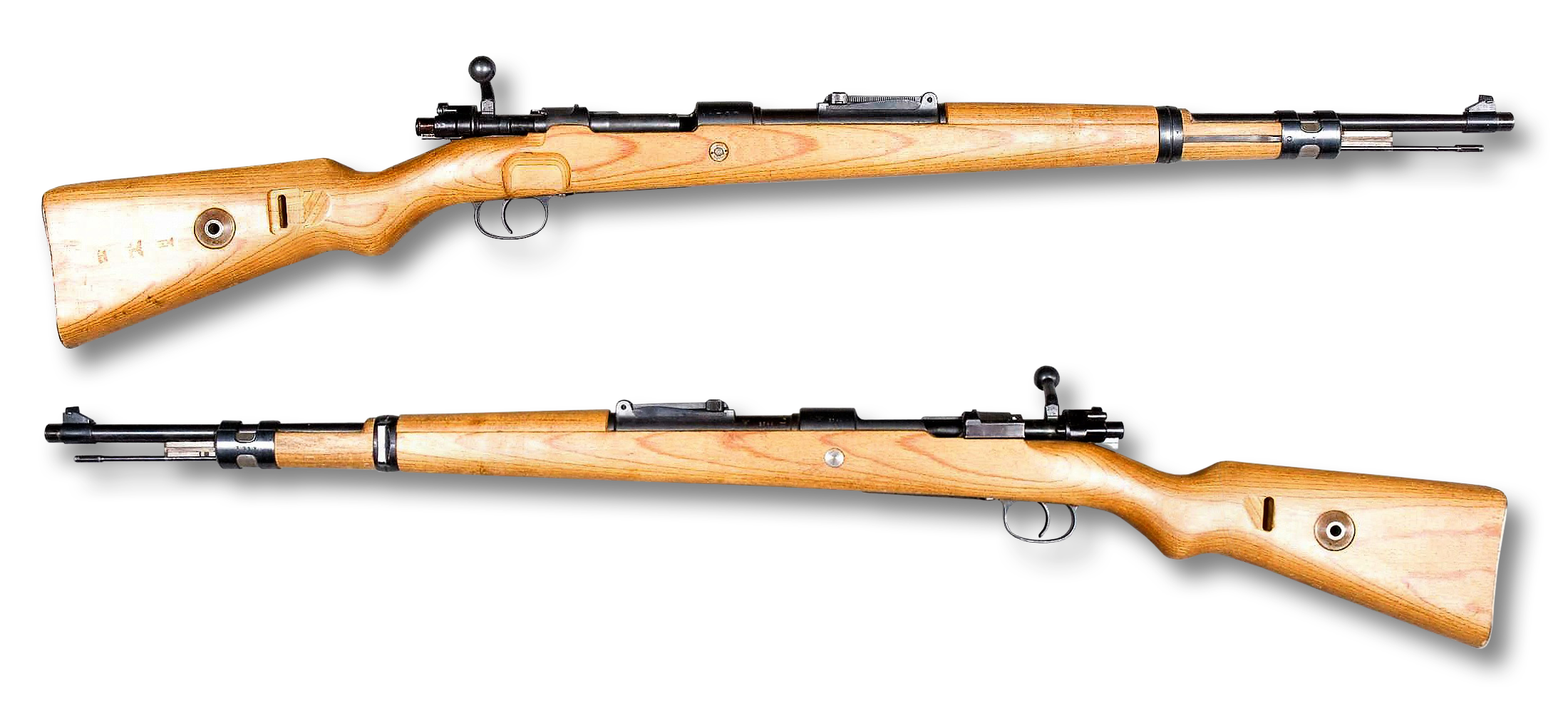
- Karabiner 98k made in 1940 from the collections of the Swedish Army Museum
- Type: Bolt-action rifle
- Place of origin: Nazi Germany

Service history
- In service: 1934–present
- Used by: See Users
- Wars: See List of conflicts and wars

Production history
- Designed: 1934
- Manufacturer: Mauser (augmented by several other makers)
- Unit cost: 55 ℛ︁ℳ︁ (1935); 250 EUR current equivalent
- Produced: 1934–1945
- No. built: 14,600,000^{+}
- Variants: See Variants

Specifications
- Mass: 3.7–4.1 kg (8.2–9.0 lb)
- Length: 1,110 mm (43.70 in)
- Barrel length: 600 mm (23.62 in)
- Cartridge: 7.92×57mm Mauser
- Action: Bolt-action
- Muzzle velocity: 760 m/s (2,493 ft/s)
- Effective firing range: 500 m (550 yd) with iron sights 800 or 1,000 m (870 or 1,090 yd) with telescopic sight
- Maximum firing range: 4,700 m (5,100 yd) with s.S. Patrone
- Feed system: 5-round stripper clip, internal magazine
- Sights: Iron sights or telescopic sight.

The Karabiner 98 kurz ('carbine 98 short'), often abbreviated Karabiner 98k, Kar98k, or K98k (sometimes incorrectly referred to as K98, a Polish copy of the Kar98a), is a bolt-action rifle chambered for the 7.92×57mm Mauser cartridge. It was adopted on 21 June 1935 as the standard service rifle by the German Wehrmacht. It was one of the final developments in the long line of Mauser military rifles.

Although supplemented by semi-automatic and fully automatic rifles during World War II, the Karabiner 98k remained the primary German service rifle until the end of the war in 1945. Millions were captured by the Soviets at the conclusion of World War II and were widely distributed as military aid. The Karabiner 98k therefore continues to appear in conflicts across the world as they are taken out of storage during times of strife.

== History ==
In February 1934, the Heereswaffenamt (Army Weapons Agency) ordered the adoption of a new military rifle. The Karabiner 98k was derived from earlier rifles, namely the Mauser Standardmodell of 1924 and the Karabiner 98b, which in turn had both been developed from the Gewehr 98. Since the Karabiner 98k rifle was shorter than the earlier Karabiner 98b (the 98b was a carbine in name only, as it was in reality a version of the Gewehr 98 long rifle designated a carbine to adhere to the Treaty of Versailles; the 98b was additionally fitted with a tangent rear sight rather than the more claustrophobic "Lange" ramp sight), the new rifle was given the designation Karabiner 98 kurz, meaning "Carbine 98 Short". Just like its predecessor, the rifle was noted for its reliability, safety and an effective range of up to 500 metres (550 yd) with iron sights and 1,000 metres (1,090 yd) with an 8× telescopic sight.

The desire for adopting new shorter barreled rifles and the introduction of the Karabiner 98k, featuring a 600 mm (23.62 in) long barrel, were reasons for changing the standard German service ball rifle cartridge. The 1903 pattern 7.92×57mm Mauser S Patrone produced excessive muzzle flash when fired from arms that did not have a long barrel like the Gewehr 98. It was found that the s.S. Patrone, originally designed for long range machine gun use, produced less muzzle flash out of rifles that had a shorter barrel and also provided better accuracy. Because of this, the S Patrone was phased out in 1933 and the s.S. Patrone became the standard German service ball cartridge in the 1930s.

== Design details ==
=== Features ===
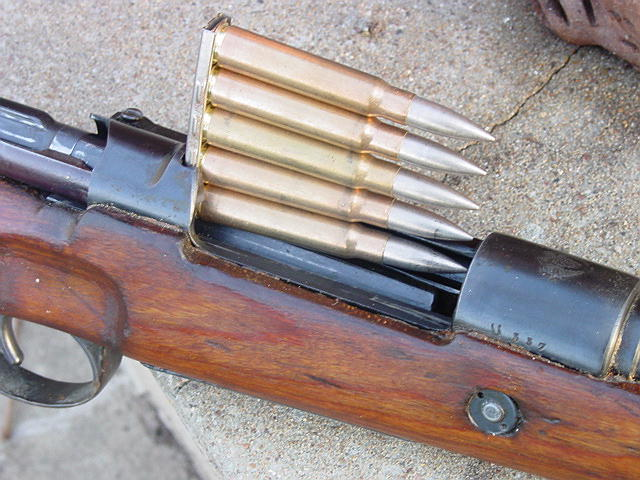
Karabiner 98k stripper clip with five 7.92×57mm Mauser cartridges

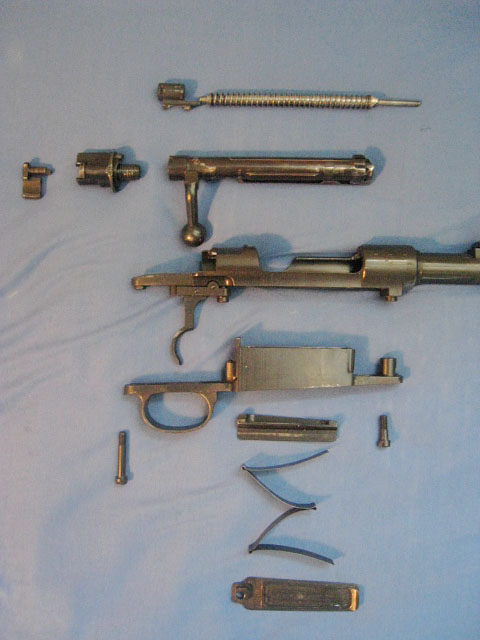
A disassembled Karabiner 98k action

The Karabiner 98k is a controlled-feed bolt-action rifle based on the Mauser M98 system. Its internal magazine can be loaded with five 7.92×57mm Mauser cartridges from a stripper clip or one-by-one. After loading, the empty clip is ejected when the bolt is closed. The straight bolt handle found on the Gewehr 98 bolt was replaced by a turned-down bolt handle on the Karabiner 98k. This change made it easier to rapidly operate the bolt, reduced the amount the handle projected beyond the receiver, and enabled mounting of aiming optics directly above the receiver. Each rifle was furnished with a short length of cleaning rod, fitted through the bayonet stud. The joined rods from 3 rifles provided one full-length cleaning rod.

The metal parts of the rifle were blued, a process in which steel is partially protected against rust by a layer of magnetite (Fe_{3}O_{4}). Such a thin black oxide layer provides only minimal protection against rust or corrosion, unless also treated with a water-displacing oil to reduce wetting and galvanic corrosion. From 1944 onwards phosphating/Parkerizing was introduced as a more effective metal surface treatment.

=== Sights ===
The impractical Langevisier or "rollercoaster" rear sight of the Mauser Gewehr 1898 was replaced with a conventional tangent leaf sight. The Karabiner 98k rear tangent sight was comparatively flatter and did not obstruct the view to the sides during aiming as the Langevisier. Originally, the Karabiner 98k iron sight line had an open-pointed-post-type (barleycorn) front sight, and a tangent-type rear sight with a V-shaped rear notch. From 1939 onwards the post front sight was hooded to reduce glare under unfavourable light conditions and add protection for the post. These standard sight lines consisted of somewhat coarse aiming elements, making it suitable for rough field handling, aiming at distant area fire targets and low-light usage, but less suitable for precise aiming at distant or small point targets. It is graduated for 7.92×57mm Mauser s.S. Patrone cartridges loaded with 12.8 g (197 gr) s.S. (schweres Spitzgeschoß – "heavy pointed bullet") ball bullets from 100 to 2,000 m (109 to 2,187 yd) in 100 m (109 yd) increments. The sight line of early productions rifles have the ranging scale copied at the bottom of the tangent aiming element for setting the range whilst lying down. The Karabiner 98k has a 500 mm (19.7 in) sight radius. The sight lines were factory zeroed (Anschießen) as part of the acceptance process before issue. The non user adjustable windage was factory set by horizontally drifting the front sight in a dovetail. It was discouraged to (re)zero the iron sight line by non-armorers.

During World War II, s.S. Patrone ball ammunition was gradually replaced by S.m.E. - Spitzgeschoß mit Eisenkern ("spitzer with iron core") mild steel cored projectile ammunition and later by S.m.E. lg - Spitzgeschoß mit Eisenkern lang ("spitzer with iron core long") ammunition to save on lead and other metals that became scarce in Germany during the war. Within the Karabiner 98k effective range the external ballistic behavior of these rounds were practically identical to s.S. ammunition, so the iron sight line range graduation could be retained.

=== Stock ===
Early Karabiner 98k rifles had solid one-piece stocks. From 1937 onwards, the rifles had laminated stocks, the result of trials that had stretched through the 1930s. Plywood laminates are stronger and resisted warping better than the conventional one-piece patterns, did not require lengthy maturing, and were cheaper. The laminated stocks were, due to their dense composite structure, somewhat heavier compared to one-piece stocks. In addition to the use of walnut and beech laminate, elm was used in small quantities. The butts of the semi-pistol grip Karabiner 98k stocks were not uniform. Until early 1940 the stocks had a flat buttplate. After 1940, some stocks had a cupped buttplate to prevent the separation of the butt stock. All stocks had a steel buttplate.

=== Accessories ===
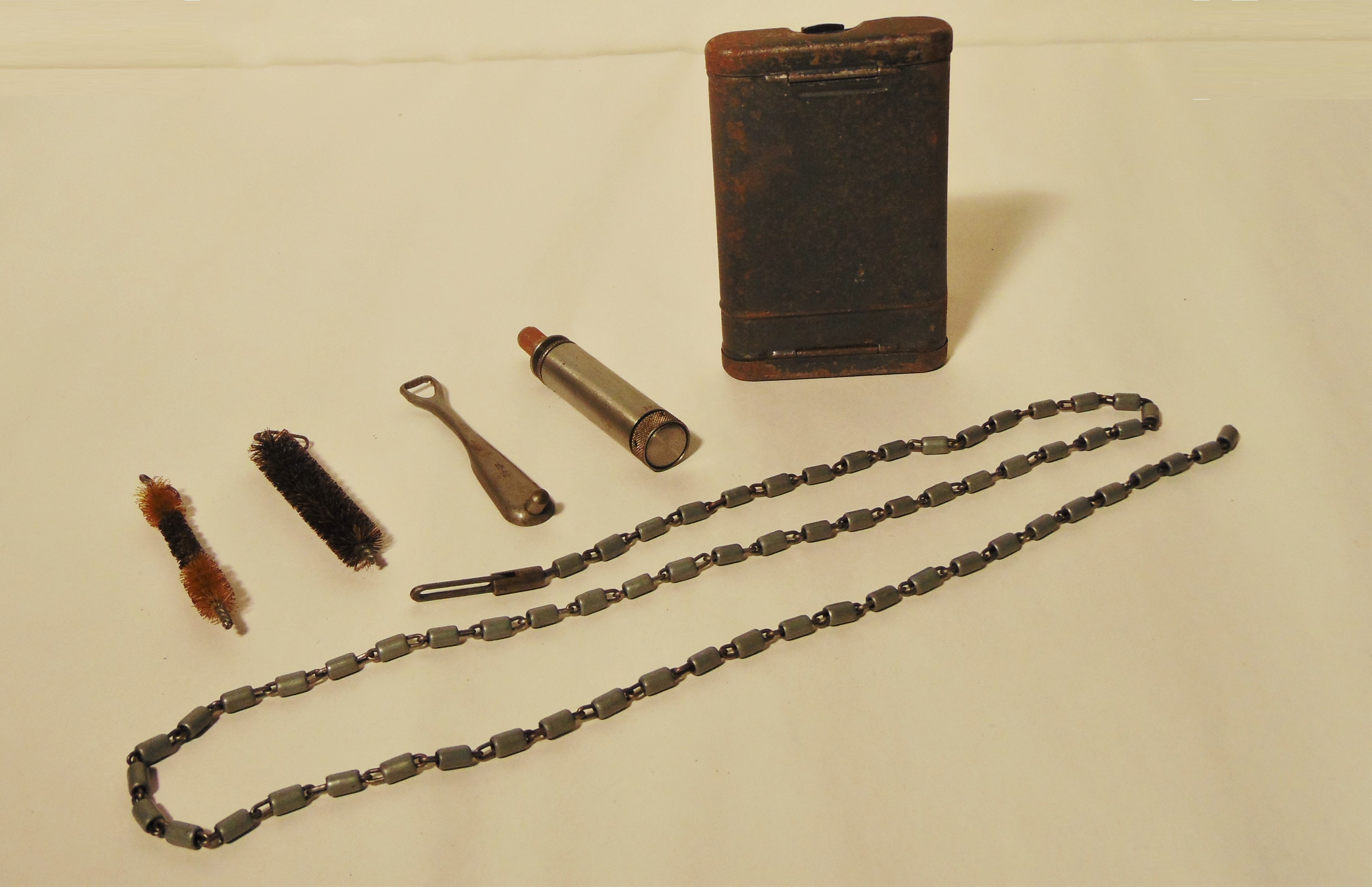
Reinigungsgerät 34 ("Cleaning Kit 34") for field maintenance

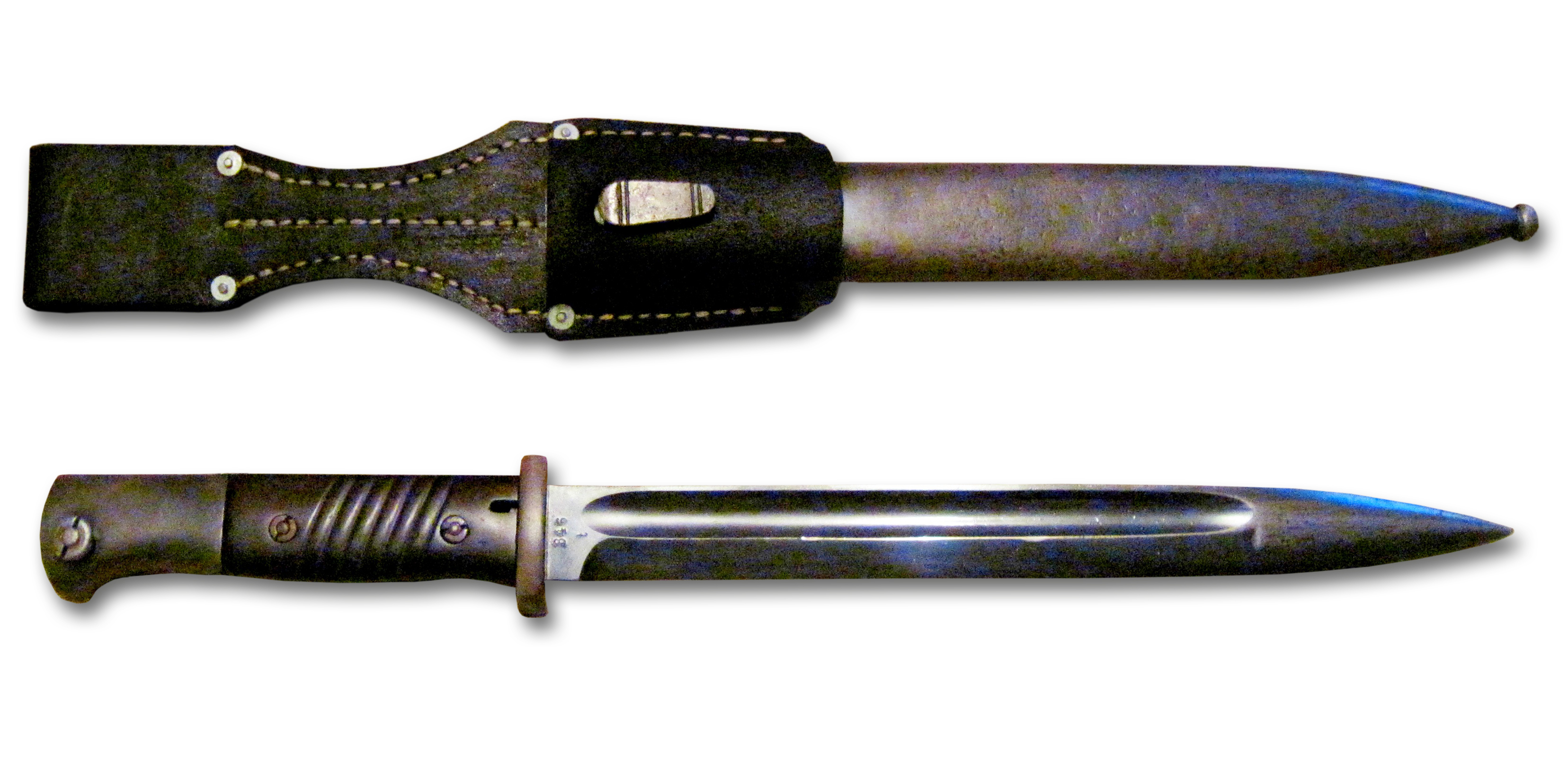
S84/98 III bayonet and scabbard

When issued, the Karabiner 98k came accompanied with assorted accessory items including a sling, a protective muzzle cover, and for field maintenance a Reinigungsgerät 34 ("Cleaning Kit 34") or RG34 kit. Introduced in 1934, the Reinigungsgerät 34 consisted of a flat 85 mm (3.3 in) wide by 135 mm (5.3 in) long sheet metal container with two hinged lids carried on the person, which held an oiler, a take down tool for removing the floorplate and cleaning the receiver of the rifle, an aluminum barrel pull-through chain, a cleaning and an oiling brush, and short lengths of tow used as cleaning patches. From 1905 until 1945, the German military used Ballistol intended for cleaning, lubricating, and protecting metallic, wooden and leather firearms parts.

The Karabiner 98k rifle was designed to be used with an S84/98 III bayonet. The S84/98 III had a blade length of 252 mm (9.9 in) and an overall length of 385 mm (15.2 in) and was accompanied by a bayonet frog. The Seitengewehr 42 or SG 42 was a shorter multi tool combat knife that could also be mounted as a bayonet on the Karabiner 98k rifle. The SG 42 was issued in small numbers.

==== Rifle grenade launcher ====
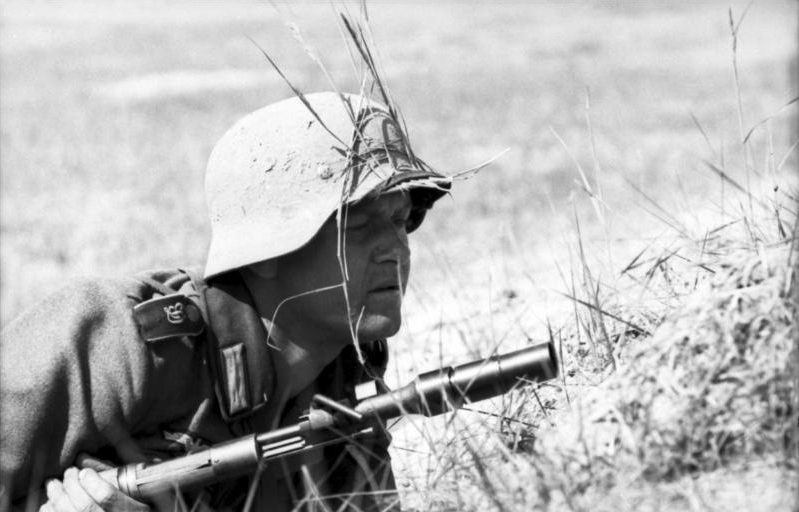
Private of the Panzer-Grenadier-Division Großdeutschland with Karabiner 98k and mounted Schießbecher

In 1942, an attachable rifle grenade launcher called the Gewehrgranatengerät or Schiessbecher ("shooting cup") was introduced that was developed based on rifle grenade launcher models designed during World War I. The 30 mm Schiessbecher cup-type rifle grenade launcher could be mounted on any Karabiner 98k and was intended to replace all previous rifle grenade launcher models. The rifle grenade launcher could be used against infantry, fortifications and light armored vehicles up to a range of 280 m (306 yd). For these differing tasks, several specialized grenades with accompanying special propelling cartridges were developed for the 1,450,113 produced Schiessbecher rifle grenade launchers. The rifle grenade-propelling cartridges fired a wooden projectile through the barrel to the rifle grenade that, upon impact, automatically primed the rifle grenade. The Schiessbecher could be mounted on the Karabiner 98a, G98/40, StG 44 and FG 42.

==== ZF41 long eye relief optical sight ====
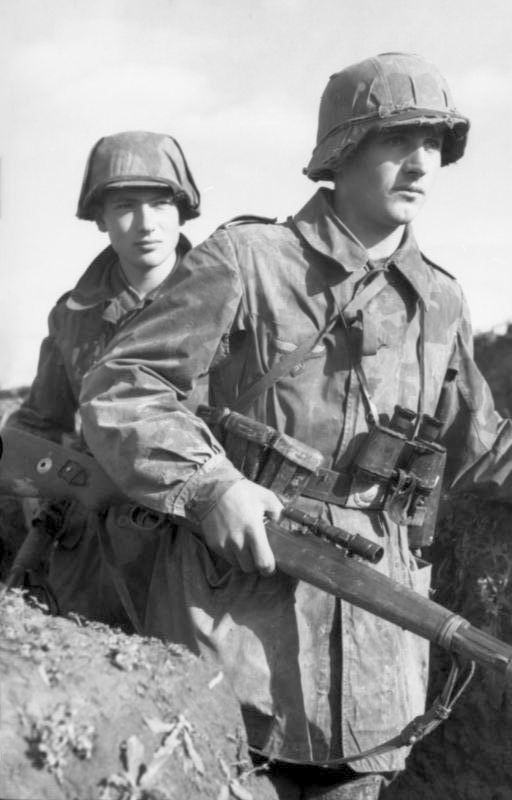
Luftwaffe Field Divisions soldier with Karabiner 98K and mounted ZF41 in Russia, 1942

Starting from 1941, the short 1.5× Zielfernrohr 41 (ZF41) long eye relief telescopic sight was fitted over the rear iron sight element to some Karabiner 98k rifles for designated marksman use. Adding the ZF41 to the rifle turned the Karabiner 98k essentially into an early somewhat big and heavy scout rifle, though that concept did not exist at that time. The ZF41 was in fact the first attempt to provide the ordinary infantryman with a rifle capable of being used for sharpshooting. Early production ZF41 were matched, zeroed and fitted on Karabiner 98k rifles selected for being exceptionally accurate at the factory before issue. After the development of a field replaceable mount the ZF41 sights were issued to be mounted on random Karabiner 98k rifles by field armorers. This led to an inevitable reduction in accuracy in lots of these field fitted rifles. By the end of the war in 1945, more than 100,000 ZF41 sights had been produced, the largest production of German optical sights during the war.

==== Suppressor ====
A removable, muzzle-mounted HUB-23 suppressor, visually resembling the Schießbecher, was manufactured for the Karabiner 98k. After several suppressor proposals from the firearms industry and the SS-Waffenakademie (SS Weapons Academy), the HUB-23 was produced based on a design proposal by Unteroffizier Schätzle. The HUB-23 weighs 0.5 kg (1.1 lb) and is 180 mm (7.1 in) long. The maximum effective range of a Karbiner 98k with a HUB-23 mounted and firing special subsonic Nahpatrone ("near cartridge") reduced load ammunition with a muzzle velocity of 220 m/s (722 ft/s) was 300 m (330 yd). The use of the HUB-23 suppressor and subsonic ammunition resulted in a sound signature reduction by 75%. The HUB-23 suppressor and the special subsonic ammunition were mainly used by special forces units such as the Brandenburgers and snipers.

== Variants ==
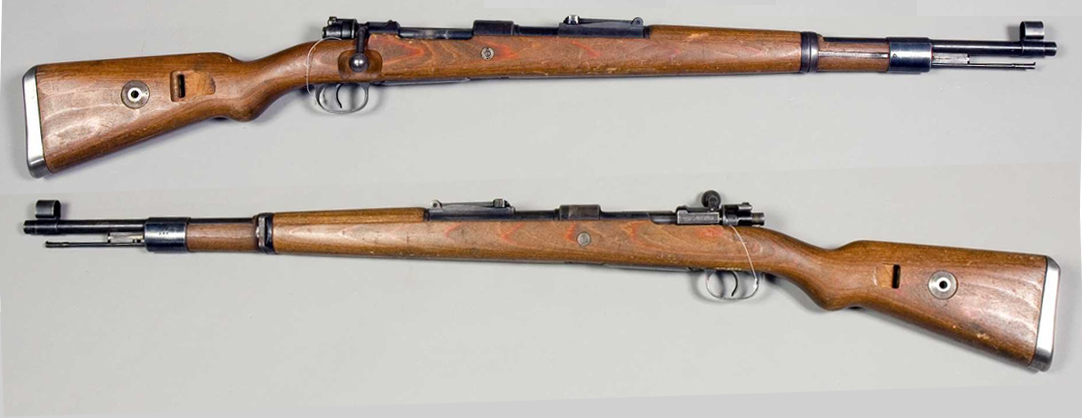
Karabiner 98k featuring simplified non-critical parts from the collections of the Swedish Army Museum

=== Kriegsmodell ===
Starting in late 1944, Karabiner 98k production began transition to the Kriegsmodell ("war model") variant. This version was simplified to increase the rate of production, removing the bayonet lug, cleaning rod, stock disc (which functions as a bolt disassembly tool), and other features deemed unnecessary. Non-critical parts like the stock were finished to lower standards and metal parts like the nose cap, barrel band, floor plate and trigger guard (lacking the small locking screw provision) were simplified stamped parts and less elaborately mounted to the rifle. The M98 bolt was also simplified by no longer milling the two oval-shaped emergency gas relief holes in the bottom of the bolt. Instead, two emergency gas relief holes were drilled and the bolt guide was omitted from the bolt body. It had fewer serial numbered parts, a phosphate metal surface finish, and a hole at the bottom end of the butt plate that replaced the stock disk. At least two transitional variants existed, which incorporated only some Kriegsmodell features, and some factories never switched to Kriegsmodell production at all.

=== Sniper variants ===
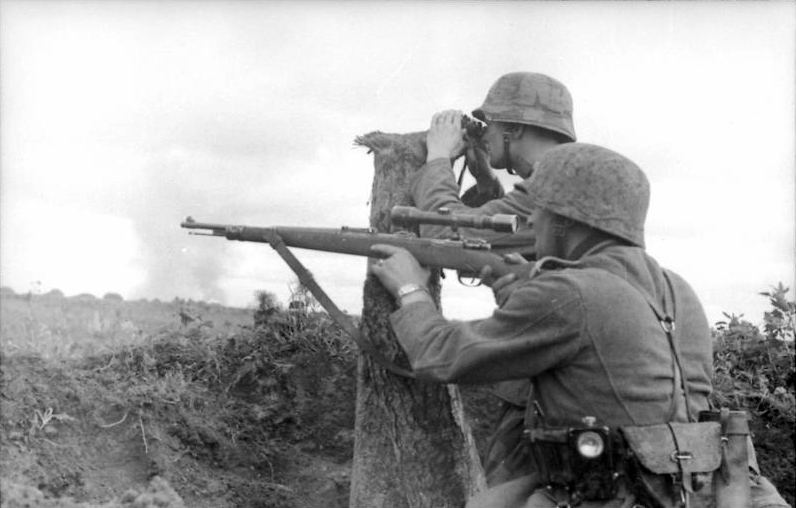
German sniper aiming his Karabiner 98k with Zeiss ZF39 4×36 telescopic sight during the Battle of Voronezh in 1942

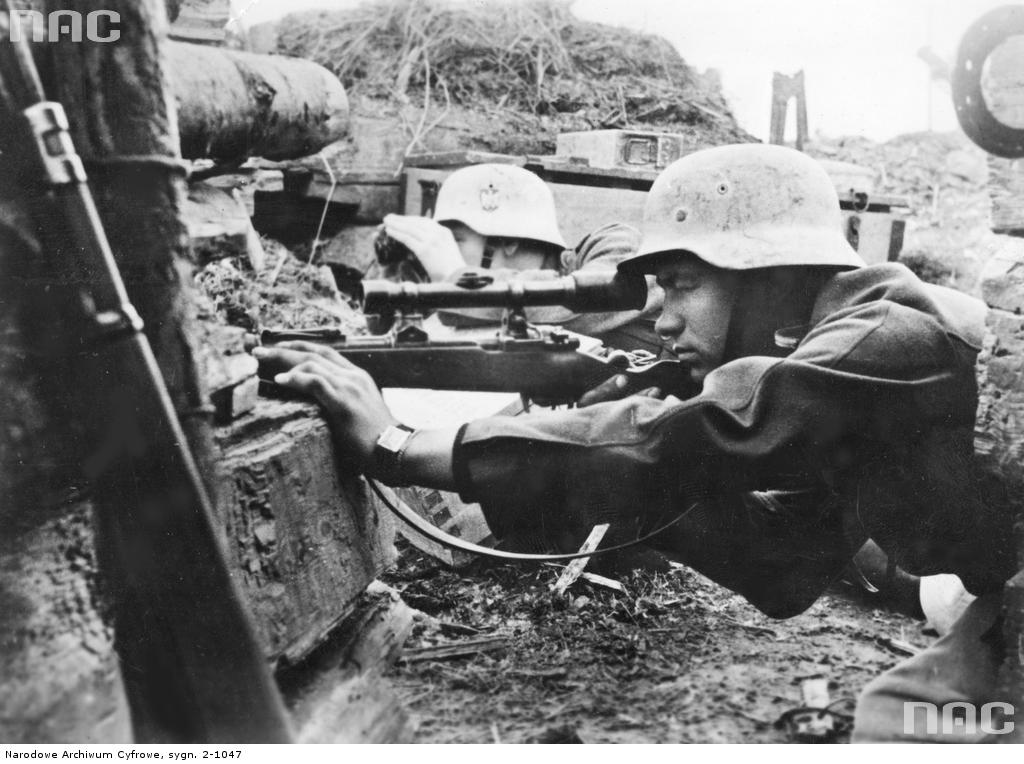
German sniper team with Mauser Karabiner 98k rifle fitted with a Dialytan RH36 4×32 telescopic sight in position among the rubble on the Eastern Front

Despite the experiences of World War I, prior to the outbreak of World War II the German military command believed sniper rifles with telescopic sights were not necessary due to military technology advances in connection with new resulting tactics. Partly for that reason, the Karabiner 98k was not designed for use with aiming optics and the German military did not standardize a particular telescopic sight or mounting system and fielded many variants of sniper rifles. Already in the Poland campaign, and especially in the Russian campaign, it became apparent that specialist snipers were urgently needed as substantial losses were suffered caused by enemy snipers. For snipers, Karabiner 98k rifles selected for being exceptionally accurate during factory tests were fitted with a telescopic sight and issued as sniper rifles. The sniper rifles with Zeiss Zielvier 4× (ZF39) telescopic sights were expected to be capable of head or chest shots up to 400 m (437 yd) and to hit a standing man at 600 m (656 yd) when used by a skilled sniper. Regarding effective support/harassment fire ranges of up to 1,000 m (1,094 yd) were achievable. The German Zeiss Zielvier 4× (ZF39) telescopic sight had bullet drop compensation in 50 m (55 yd) increments for ranges from 100 to 800 m (109 to 875 yd) or in some variations from 100 to 1,000 m (109 to 1,094 yd). It was not windage adjustable. There were also Zeiss Zielsechs 6× and Zielacht 8× telescopic sights and sights by various other manufacturers like the Ajack 4× and 6×, Hensoldt Dialytan 4×, Kahles Heliavier 4× and Opticotechna Dialytan 4× with similar features employed on Karabiner 98k sniper rifles. Several different mountings produced by various manufacturers were used. Attaching telescopic sights to a Karabiner 98k required machining by a skilled armourer. A telescopic sight mounted low above the center axis of the receiver will not leave enough space between the rifle and the telescopic sight body for unimpaired operation of the bolt handle or the three-position safety catch lever. This ergonomic problem was solved by mounting the telescopic sight relatively high above the receiver and sometimes modifying or replacing the safety operating lever or using an offset mounting to position the telescopic sight axis to the left side in relation to the receiver center axis. A common minor modification was replacing the stock buttplate with a waffled anti-slip "sniper" buttplate. Approximately 132,000 Karabiner 98k sniper rifles were produced by Germany.

=== Paratrooper variants ===
Experimental versions of the Karabiner 98k intended for the German paratroopers that could be transported in shortened modes were produced. The standard Karabiner 98k was too long to be carried in a parachute drop. However, the German paratroopers made only limited combat drops after the 1941 Battle of Crete; there was therefore little need for these rifles. Specimens with folding stocks (Klappschaft) and with detachable barrels (Abnehmbarer Lauf) are known to have been produced at Mauser Oberndorf.

=== G40k ===
The G40k with a total length of 1,000 mm (39.37 in) and a barrel length of 490 mm (19.29 in) and 3.2 kg (7.1 lb) weight was a shortened experimental version of the Karabiner 98k. The rear tangent sight of the G40k was graduated for s.S. Patrone cartridges from 100 m to 1000 m in 100 m increments. A batch of 82 G40k rifles was produced in 1941 at Mauser Oberndorf.

=== Mauser KKW cadet rifle ===
The Mauser KKW (Klein Kaliber Wehrsportgewehr) cadet rifle is a single shot, .22 caliber rifle that was introduced in 1938. Its operation is virtually identical to the Karabiner 98k. These cadet rifles were used by all German military, paramilitary and police organizations, especially the Hitler Youth for basic firearms and marksmanship training.

== Receiver codes ==
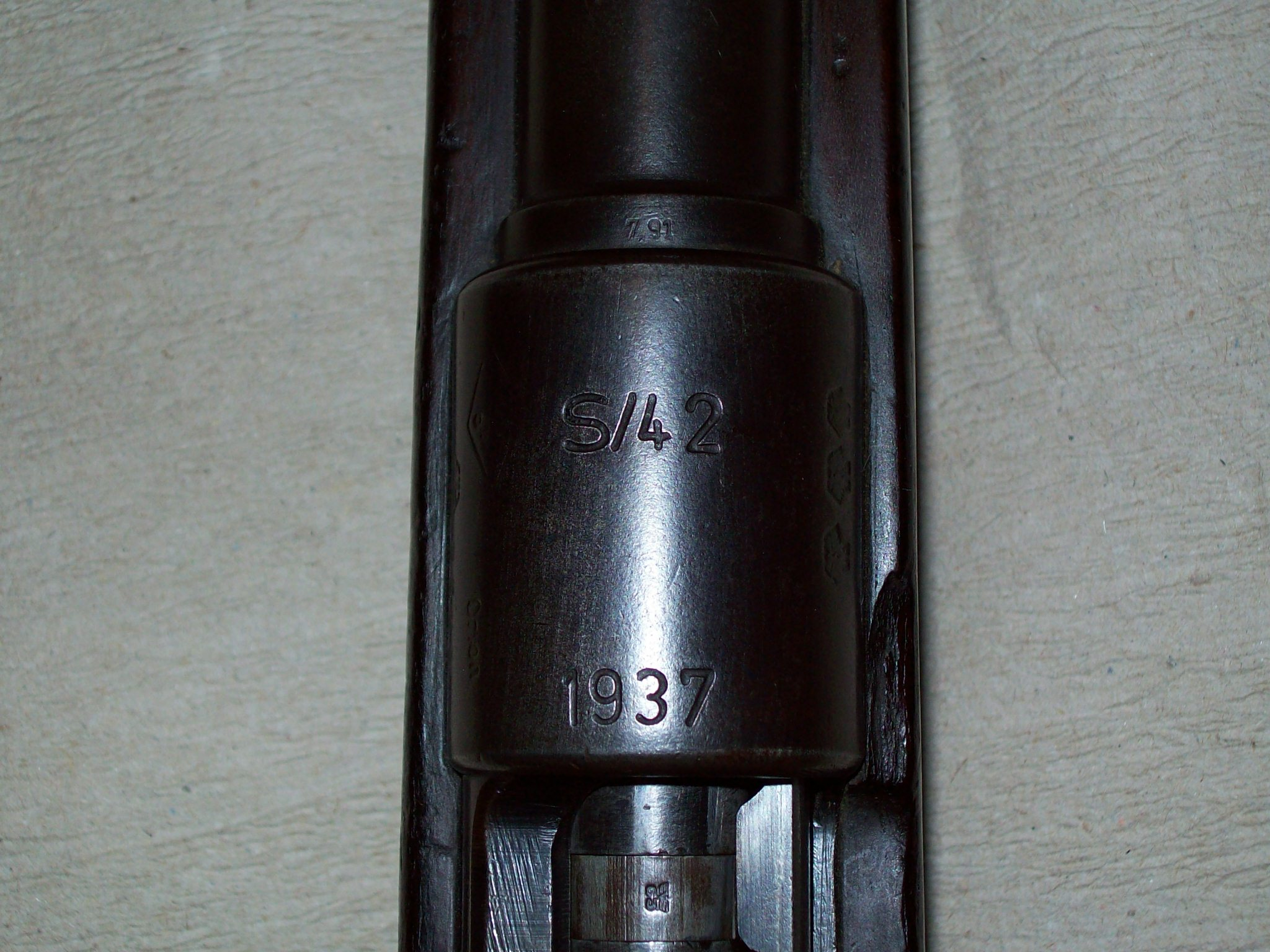
Karabiner 98k with code S/42 1937 stamped on the receiver denoting it was made in 1937 by Mauser in Oberndorf am Neckar

Karabiner 98k receivers were stamped with a factory code indicating date and location of manufacture. These codes were originally prefixed with "S/" and suffixed with "K" for 1934 or "G" for 1935. The intervening numeric code indicated location. The two- or four-digit year of manufacture was stamped on the receiver ring instead of a letter suffix after 1935. The numeric codes were:

- 27 for Erfurter Maschinen- und Werkzeugfabrik (ERMA) in Erfurt
- 42 for Mauser in Oberndorf am Neckar
- 147 for Sauer & Sohn in Suhl
- 237 for Berlin-Lübecker Maschinenfabrik in Lübeck
- 243 for Mauser in Borsigwalde
- 337 for Gustloff Werke in Weimar
- 660 for Steyr-Daimler-Puch in Steyr
- 945 for Waffenwerke Brünn in Brno

The "S/" prefix was dropped and letters were used for location codes beginning in 1937, although some manufacturers retained the numeric codes past that date. The letter codes were:

- ar for Mauser in Borsigwalde
- ax for Erma Werke
- bcd for Gustloff Werke
- bnz for Steyr-Daimler-Puch
- BSW for Berlin-Suhler Waffen und Fahrzeugwerke (BSW is abbreviation not letter code
- byf for Mauser in Oberndorf am Neckar
- ce for Sauer & Sohn
- dot for Waffenwerke Brünn in Brno
- dou for Waffenwerke Brünn in Bystrica
- duv for Berlin-Lübecker Maschinenfabrik
- svw45 for Mauser 1945 production in Oberndorf am Neckar
- swp45 for Waffenwerke Brünn 1945 production in Brno

Combined production by multiple manufacturers are indicated by two codes separated by a slash.

== Usage history ==
=== Pre–World War II export ===
Though most Karabiner 98k rifles went to the German armed forces, the weapon was sold abroad in the years prior to World War II. In Portugal, a large quantity of Karabiner 98k rifles made by Mauser Werke were adopted as the Espingarda 7,92 mm m/937 Mauser infantry rifle. They were later used during the Portuguese Colonial War. Other pre-war exports of Karabiner 98ks were to China (an unknown number of rifles 1935 - 38), and 20,000 in 1937 to Japan. Exports of Karabiner 98ks decreased as war drew closer, as all available production capacity was needed to equip the German Armed Forces.

=== World War II use ===
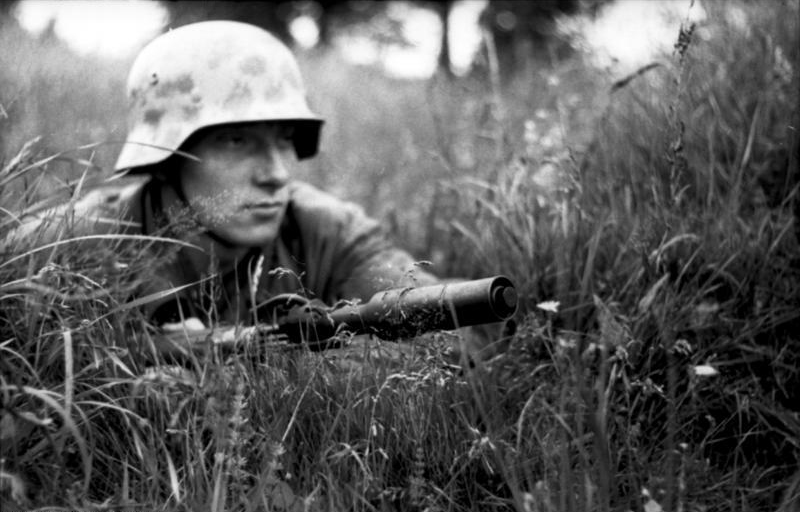
A concealed German soldier in northern France, 1944. His Karabiner 98k is equipped with a Gewehrgranatgerät cup-type grenade launcher attachment.

The Mauser Karabiner 98k rifle was widely used by all branches of the armed forces of Germany during World War II. It saw action in every theatre of war involving German forces, including occupied Europe, North Africa, the Soviet Union, Finland, and Norway. Although comparable to the weapons fielded by Germany's enemies at the beginning of the War, its disadvantages in rate of fire became more apparent as American and Soviet armies began to field more semi-automatic rifles and submachine guns for their troops. Still, it continued to be the main infantry rifle of the Wehrmacht until the end of the war, and about between 900 thousand and 2 million of them were produced annually. Resistance forces in German-occupied Europe made frequent use of captured German Karabiner 98k rifles. The Soviet Union also made extensive use of captured Karabiner 98k rifles and other German infantry weapons due to the Red Army experiencing a critical shortage of small arms during the early years of World War II. Many German soldiers used the verbal expression "Kars" as the slang name for the rifle.

Sweden ordered 5,000 Karabiner 98ks that were provided from the regular production run in 1939 for use as light anti-tank rifles under the designation gevär m/39 (rifle m/39) but it was soon evident that the penetration offered by the 7.92×57mm Mauser was inadequate and thus the gevär m/39 were rechambered to the 8×63mm patron m/32, which was a more powerful 8 mm cartridge specifically designed for long-range machinegun fire. Accordingly, the Karabiner 98ks were rechambered in Sweden for the 8×63mm patron m/32 and the internal box magazine of the M 98 system was adapted to match the dimensionally larger 8×63mm patron m/32 cartridge, reducing the capacity to 4 rounds and accepted into service as pansarvärnsgevär m/40. A muzzle brake was installed to reduce the excessive free recoil, and the resulting weapon was designated gevär m/40 in Swedish service. They were however also found to be unsatisfactory and were soon withdrawn from service, and sold off after WW II.

=== Post–World War II use ===
==== Soviet capture ====
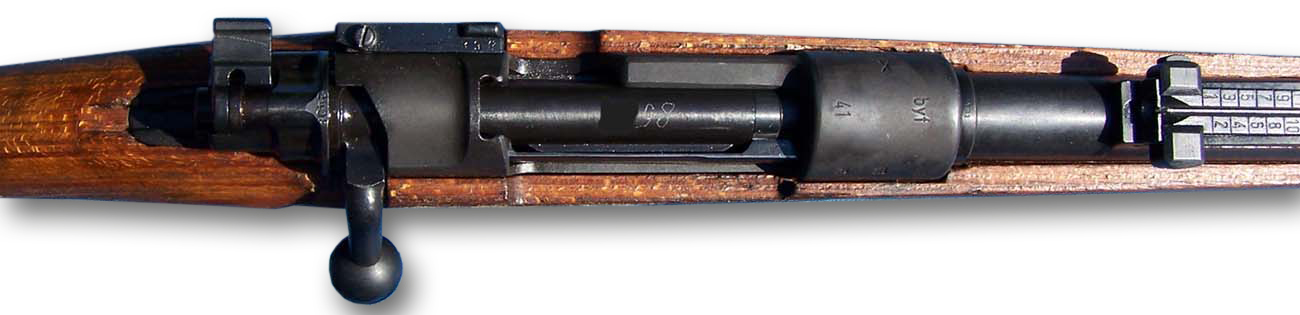
A close up of the action of a Karabiner 98k. The electro-penciled bolt and the X on the left side of the receiver are indicators of a Russian-captured weapon.

During World War II, the Soviet Union captured millions of Mauser Karabiner 98k rifles and refurbished them in various arms factories in the late 1940s and early 1950s. These rifles, referred to by collectors as RC ("Russian Capture") Mausers, can be identified by an "X" stamp on the left side of the receiver. The Soviet arsenals made no effort to match the rifle's original parts by serial number when reassembling them, and some metal parts (the cleaning rod, sight hood, and locking screws) were omitted after rebuilding, and instead were melted down and recycled, presumably with the other parts that were not suitable for re-use.

Many of these rifles (along with the Mosin–Nagant rifle) served in conflicts after World War II. One example of Soviet-captured Mauser Kar98k rifles being used in post-WWII conflicts is the Korean War, where a number of these rifles were provided by the Soviet Union (along with Soviet-made small arms) to Chinese Communist forces to supplement their supply of Type Zhongzheng rifles. Both the Soviet-capture Kar98k rifle and the Chinese Type Zhongzheng rifle were used extensively by the People's Volunteer Army throughout the course of the Korean War.

The Korean War would not be the only conflict where Soviet-capture Kar98k rifles and WWII German small arms were provided to the allies of the Soviet Union. The Vietnam War would become another example with Soviet-capture Mauser Karabiner 98k rifles being provided to North Vietnam by the USSR as military aid. Many Soviet-capture Karabiner 98k rifles (as well as some Karabiner 98k rifles that were left behind by the French after the First Indochina War and Type Zhongzheng rifles provided by the People's Republic of China) were found in the hands of Viet Cong guerrillas and People's Army of Vietnam (NVA) soldiers by US, South Vietnamese, South Korean, Australian and New Zealand forces alongside Soviet-bloc rifles like the Mosin–Nagant, the SKS, and the AK-47.

==== Post-occupation service ====
In the years after World War II, several European nations on both sides of the Iron Curtain that were invaded and occupied by Nazi Germany used the Mauser Karabiner 98k rifle as their standard-issue infantry rifle, due to the large number of German weapons that were left behind by the Germans at the end of World War II.

Nations like France and Norway used the Mauser Karabiner 98k rifle and other German weapons in the years after World War II. France produced a slightly modified version of the Kar 98k in the French occupation zone of Germany in the immediate post-war period. The new manufacture Kar 98ks equipped some French units that used them in Indochina for a limited time. Some of these rifles were also used by pro-French second-line units and Algerian independentists during Algerian War. French Police forces, the Paris Police Prefecture and the Compagnies Républicaines de Sécurité, used 98ks from 1945 to 1992, to fire lachrymator and smoke grenades. These rifles were also used by West German border guards.

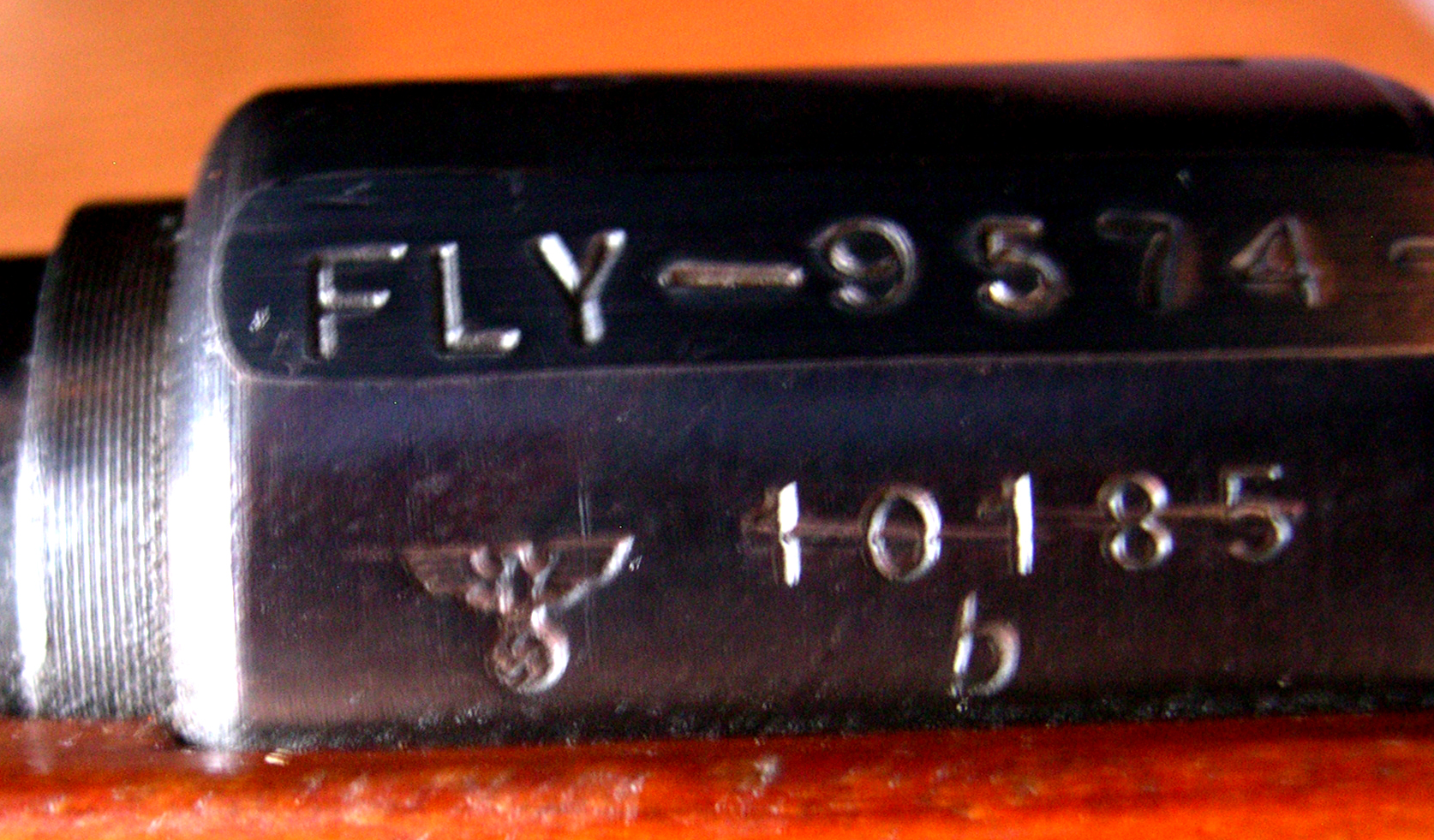
The emblem of Nazi Germany, eagle with swastika, is still visible on many of the rifles that were used by the Norwegian military. The "FLY" prefix to the serial number denotes that this rifle was issued to Flyvåpenet (Air Force).

Norway's captured Karabiner 98k rifles were soon superseded as a standard-issue weapon by the US M1 Garand, but remained in service as Norwegian Home Guard weapons until the 1990s, in which role they were rebarreled for the .30-06 Springfield round used by the M1, with a small cutout in the receiver so that the slightly longer US round could still be loaded with stripper clips. These Norwegian conversions had a section of the receiver flattened on the upper left side, where a new serial number (with a prefix denoting the branch of service) was stamped. Some of these rifles conversions were rechambered again to 7.62×51mm NATO, but this program was canceled with only a few thousand converted when Norway adopted the AG-3 (H&K G3) as a replacement for both the M1 and the K98k. Some actions from Mauser Karabiner 98k left by German armed forces in 1945 were used by Kongsberg Våpenfabrikk (currently Kongsberg Small Arms) for building both military and civilian sniper/target rifles under the Kongsberg Våpenfabrikk Skarpskyttergevær M59 - Mauser M59 and Kongsberg Våpenfabrikk Skarpskyttergevær M67 - Mauser M67 designations. These rifles were used by the Norwegian armed forces up to the 2000s. Karabiner 98k rifles rechambered to .30-06 Springfield are still used by the Svalbard Global Seed Vault security guards mainly as a last resort against polar bear attack.

In West Germany, the Karabiner 98k were issued to the Bundesgrenzschutz (BGS; English: Federal Border Guard), which was originally organized along paramilitary lines and armed as light infantry; in the 1950s.

Former German Karabiner 98k rifles were widely distributed throughout the Eastern Bloc, some being refurbished two or three times by different factories. They were used by military and para-military forces (such as the East German Combat Groups of the Working Class), and were replaced by Soviet weapons in the 1960s.

During the Greek Civil War, the Greek pro-communist factions were equipped with large numbers of Kar 98k rifles, captured from the Germans or supplied by Yugoslavia. Later, during the Cyprus Emergency, the Cypriot EOKA smuggled several dozens of these rifles from Greece.

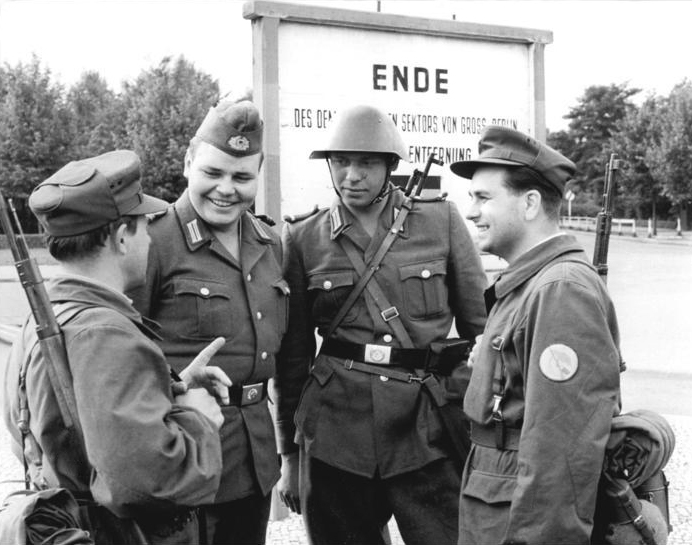
East German members of the Combat Groups of the Working Class, Border Troops and the Volkspolizei at the border of the Berlin sector in 1961. The Combat Group members are equipped with Karabiner 98k rifles.

East German refurbished Karabiner 98ks featured Russian-style thicker blue finish, a 'sunburst' proof mark and sometimes had the factory designation '1001' applied, which was the factory where the refurbishment was carried out. Numbers were re-stamped to match the receiver and old numbers barred out. Numbers of East German and Czech refurbished Karabiner 98ks were exported to the West in the late 1980s and early 1990s and are now in the hands of collectors. Russian Capture Karabiner 98ks were exported to the West in large numbers in the early and mid-2000s.

==== Yugoslavian postwar refurbishment ====
Because of the lack of weapons after World War II, the Yugoslavian arms producer Crvena Zastava (Nowadays Zastava Arms) refurbished German Karabiner 98k rifles that were left over or captured during the war. These rifles are readily identifiable as the German factory code markings have been scrubbed from the receiver and replaced with the Yugoslavian communist crest and the marking "Preduzeće 44" on the receiver's ring. In addition to this, if the refurbishment took place after 1950, the marking "/48" was added to the "Mod. 98" originally present on the left side of the receiver, becoming "Mod. 98/48". The refurbished rifles were known also as Zastava M 98/48. The refurbished Prеduzeće 44 Karabiner 98k rifles were still being used in the Yugoslav Wars of the 1990s.

==== Austrian modification and use as SSG 98k sniper rifle ====
By modifying and accurizing surplus Karabiner 98K rifles, the Austrian Army created and adopted the SSG 98k (Scharfschützengewehr 98k, literally Sharpshooter Rifle 98k) in 1958 as their standard sniper rifle. Modifications and updates included rechambering to the at the time recently introduced 7.62×51mm NATO with new 600 mm (23.6 in) free floating barrels, sporterizing the original stock and adding a rubber Pachmayr recoil pad. The rechambering matched the adoption in 1958 of the 7.62×51mm NATO Sturmgewehr 58 by the Austrian military. The SSG 98k was issued with the Kahles ZF 58 4×41 telescopic sight that could be quickly user detached and attached from their mounts, but retained iron sights for back up purposes. The ZF 58 optical sight featured a Bullet Drop Compensating (BDC) elevation turret tuned for the ballistic trajectory of the gun-cartridge combination with a predefined projectile weight/type, muzzle velocity and air density at ranges. The Austrian military ZF 58 sight's BDC was calibrated from 100–1,000 m (109–1,094 yd) in 100 m (109 yd) increments. For storage and transport, the ZF 58 sights were issued with a leather carrying pouch. In Austrian service, the SSG 98k started to be replaced from 1969 when the Steyr SSG 69 sniper rifle was adopted.

== Accuracy potential ==
The following table lists minimum expected accuracy statistics for typical in service Karabiner 98k rifles firing s.S. Patrone ball service ammunition. The statistics were computed under the 1930s German method for determining accuracy, which is more complex than Western methods which usually involve firing a group of shots and then measuring the overall diameter of the group. The German method differs in that after a group of shots are fired into the target, hits on the outer part of the target are disregarded, while only half of the hits on the inner part of the circles are counted (50% or R_{50}). This significantly reduces the overall diameter of the groups. The vertical and horizontal measurements of the reduced groups are then used to measure accuracy. This circular error probable method used by the German and other European militaries cannot be converted and is not comparable to US military methods for determining rifle accuracy. When the R_{50} results are doubled the hit probability increases to 93.7%.

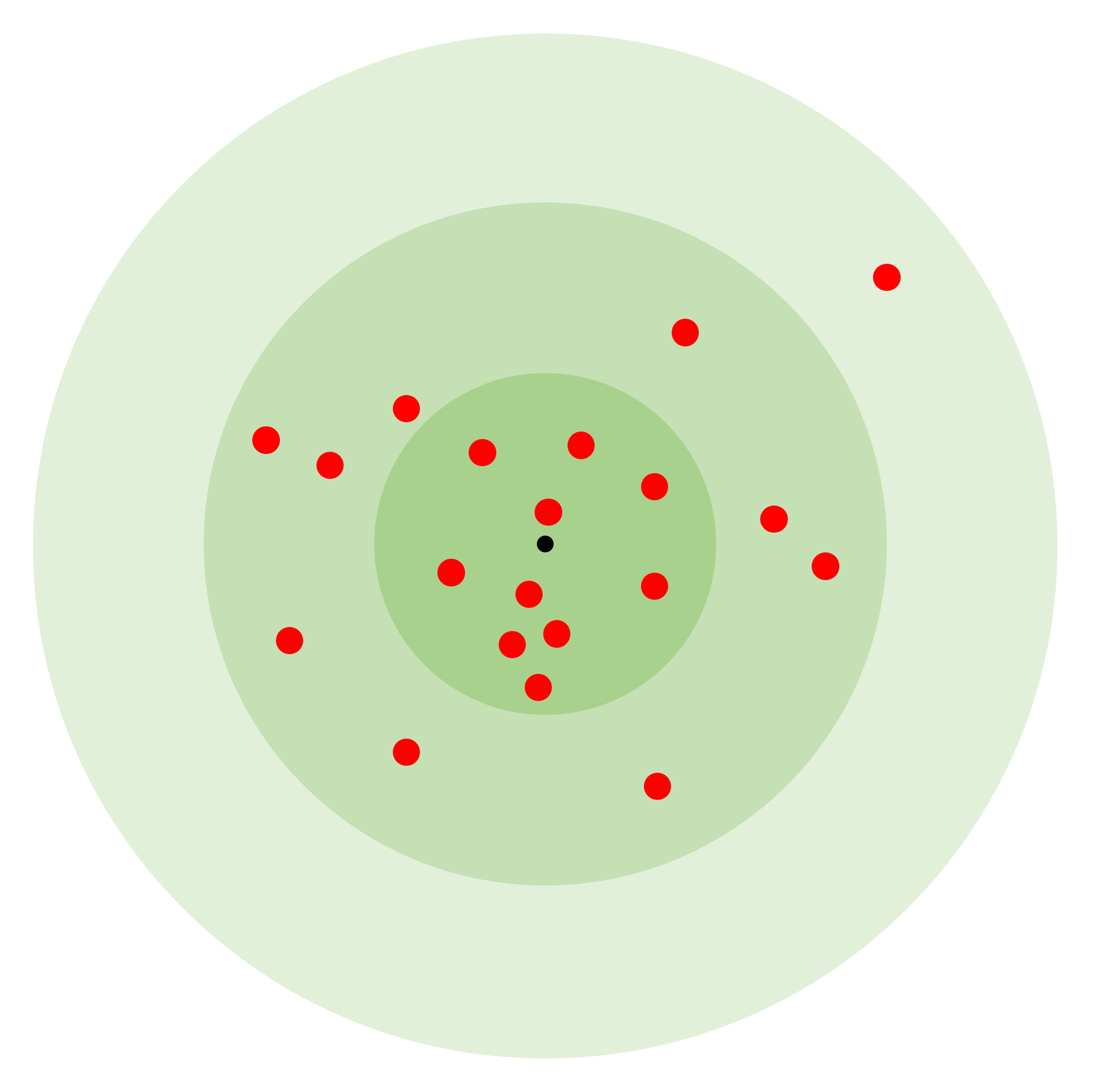
Circular error probable 20 hits distribution example

Karabiner 98k average dispersion with s.S. Patrone 7.92×57mm service ammunition
Range	Vertical accuracy of fire (R_{50})	Horizontal accuracy of fire (R_{50})	Radius (R_{50})	Diameter of group (R_{93.7})
0 m (0 yd)	0 cm (0.0 in)	0 cm (0.0 in)	0 cm (0.0 in)	0 cm (0.0 in)
100 m (109 yd)	4 cm (1.6 in)	3 cm (1.2 in)	3 cm (1.2 in)	12 cm (4.7 in)
200 m (219 yd)	8 cm (3.1 in)	6 cm (2.4 in)	6 cm (2.4 in)	24 cm (9.4 in)
300 m (328 yd)	12 cm (4.7 in)	10 cm (3.9 in)	10 cm (3.9 in)	40 cm (15.7 in)
400 m (437 yd)	16 cm (6.3 in)	14 cm (5.5 in)	14 cm (5.5 in)	56 cm (22.0 in)
500 m (547 yd)	22 cm (8.7 in)	18 cm (7.1 in)	18 cm (7.1 in)	72 cm (28.3 in)
600 m (656 yd)	28 cm (11.0 in)	23 cm (9.1 in)	-	-
700 m (766 yd)	34 cm (13.4 in)	27 cm (10.6 in)	-	-
800 m (875 yd)	40 cm (15.7 in)	32 cm (12.6 in)	-	-
900 m (984 yd)	50 cm (19.7 in)	39 cm (15.4 in)	-	-
1,000 m (1,094 yd)	60 cm (23.6 in)	45 cm (17.7 in)	-	-
1,100 m (1,203 yd)	70 cm (27.6 in)	52 cm (20.5 in)	-	-
1,200 m (1,312 yd)	82 cm (32.3 in)	60 cm (23.6 in)	-	-
1,300 m (1,422 yd)	95 cm (37.4 in)	69 cm (27.2 in)	-	-
1,400 m (1,531 yd)	110 cm (43.3 in)	79 cm (31.1 in)	-	-
1,500 m (1,640 yd)	125 cm (49.2 in)	90 cm (35.4 in)	-	-

- R_{50} means the closest 50 percent of the shot group will all be within a circle of the mentioned diameter.
- R_{93.7} means the closest 93.7 percent of the shot group will all be within a circle of the mentioned diameter.
- The Gewehr 98 and MG 13 in semi-automatic firing mode performed similar to s.S. Patrone 7.92×57mm service ammunition.

=== Acceptance standard ===
The minimum accuracy acceptance standard for the Karabiner 98k was putting three out of five shots inside an 8 cm × 12 cm (3.1 in × 4.7 in) wide and high rectangle at a distance of 100 m (109.4 yd) during the factory zeroing (Anschießen) of the sight line and firing test with no marking or observation between rounds. If a fired round touched the edge of the rectangle it was considered inside. All five shots had to be inside a 12 cm (4.7 in) circle at 100 m (109.4 yd), which translates into 4.1 MOA as the minimum standard. The rifle manufacturer had two attempts to pass the accuracy acceptance standard and was allowed to correct the rifle between the attempts. If a rifle did not pass the first test firing submission, the unsatisfactory target was kept to compare it to the second test firing submission.

== Post–World War II derivatives ==
Many of the liberated European countries continued production of rifles similar to the Karabiner 98k, for example Fabrique Nationale (FN) in Belgium and Česká Zbrojovka (CZ) in Czechoslovakia produced both their proprietary older models and brand new Karabiner 98k rifles, many of which were assembled from leftover German parts or using captured machinery.

As with post-Nazi occupation service post-war production of derivatives was a stop-gap solution until enough numbers of more modern automatic rifles could be developed and produced. The vast majority of the 98k pattern rifles were soon stored as reserve weapons or given for very low prices to various fledgling states or rebel movements throughout the developing world. For instance, between 1950 and 1952, a hybrid of Kar 98k and Vz 24 was produced by Zbrojovka Brno for Bolivia, as Fusil Modelo Boliviano Serie B-50.

Both FN and CZ utilized a modified Kriegsmodell design, with the cleaning rod and stock disk omitted, but the bayonet lug restored. In Czechoslovakia it was known as P-18 or puška vz.98N, the first being the manufacturer's cover designation of the type, the second official army designation - rifle model 98, N for německá - German.

=== Yugoslav M48 ===
From 1948 to 1965, Yugoslav Zastava Arms produced a close copy of the Karabiner 98k imported between the wars from Fabrique Nationale called the Model 1948, which differed from the German rifle in that it had the shorter bolt-action of the Yugoslav M1924 series of rifles (not to be confused with the widely distributed Czech Vz 24, which had a standard length action), a thicker barrel profile (Yugoslavia had low chromium iron ore deposits, so they could not produce steel as hardened as the Krupp or Swedish steel used in other variants, and made up for it in adding extra material), and a rear sight enclosed in the wooden hand guard (the German-style hand guard began in front of the rear sight, unlike e.g. exports to South America that had a handguard and rear sight like the M48).

A hunting variant of the Yugoslavian M48 is still produced by Zastava Arms, it is designated as the Zastava Arms M70 bolt-action rifle now.

=== Spanish M43 ===
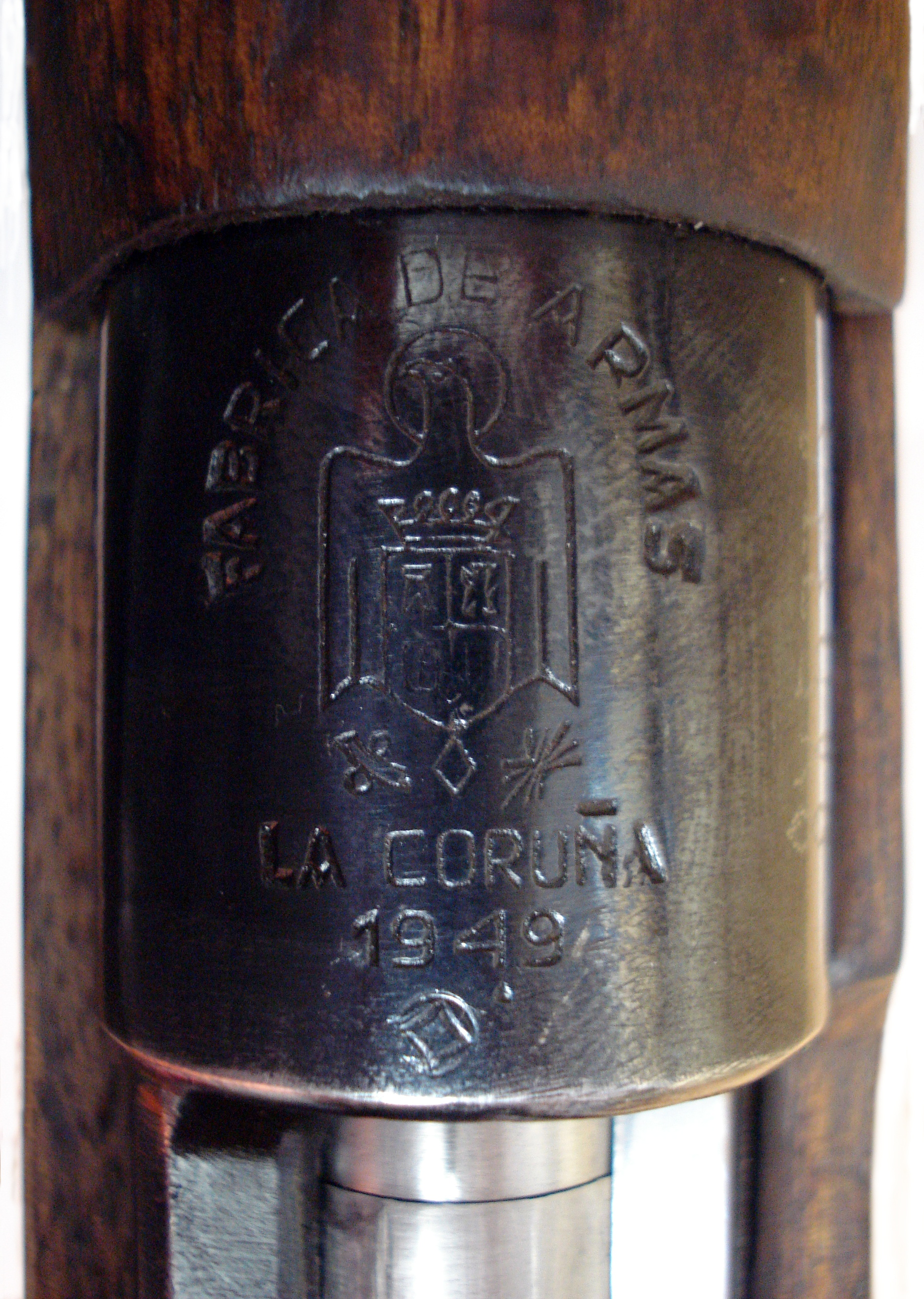
M43 Spanish Mauser - Fábrica de Armas de la Coruña

The Spanish M43, produced in A Coruña from 1944 to 1958, was a variant of the Karabiner 98k with a straight bolt handle, no front sight guard and a handle groove in the front stock much like the earlier Reichspostgewehr. It was chambered in 7.92×57mm Mauser calibre. It was the standard rifle of the Spanish units during the Ifni War. Some were rebuilt from Gewehr 98 or Republican wz. 29 rifles. The Spanish Air Force had a slightly modified version with front sight guards, the M44. When Spain began switching to the CETME automatic rifle, many M43 were converted to FR8 rifles for military training purposes and Guardia Civil service.

=== Israeli Mauser ===
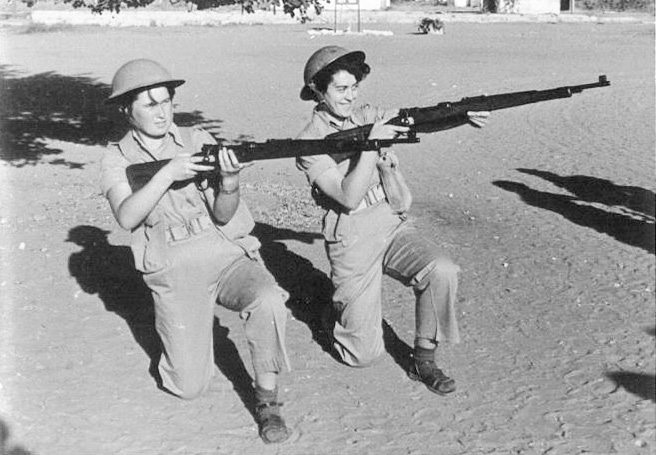
Israeli soldiers training with the Karabiner 98k in 1954

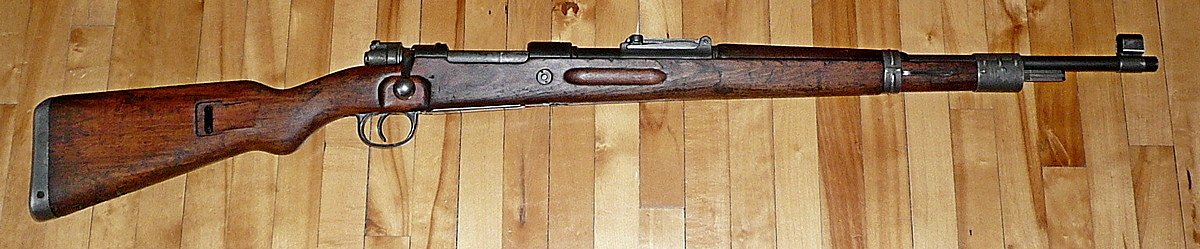
Israeli Mauser Karabiner 98k (7.62×51mm NATO)

A number of non-European nations used the Mauser Karabiner 98k rifle as well as a few guerrilla organizations in conflicts to establish new nation-states. Israel issued Mauser Karabiner 98k rifles from the late 1940s until the 1970s, which are today sought after by collectors. Many were acquired under Operation Balak.

Many Jewish organizations in Mandatory Palestine acquired them from Europe after World War II to both defend themselves and carry out operations against Arabs and British forces in the region.

The Haganah, which later evolved into the modern-day Israel Defense Forces, was one of the Jewish armed groups in Palestine that brought large numbers of Mauser Karabiner 98k rifles and other surplus arms (namely the British Lee–Enfield bolt-action rifle, which was used on a large scale by these groups) and the Mosin–Nagant from Europe after World War II. Many, though not all, Israeli-used German surplus Mauser Karabiner 98k rifles have had their Nazi Waffenamt markings and emblems stamped over with Israel Defense Forces (IDF) and Hebrew arsenal markings.

As the Arab-Israeli conflict approached and the British Mandate set to expire, the Haganah and other Jewish forces in The British Mandate of Palestine tried to get hold of as many weapons as they could in the face of an arms embargo by British colonial authorities. One of the most important purchases was a secret January 14, 1948, $12,280,000 worth contract with Czechoslovak Government including 4,500 P-18 rifles, as well as 50,400,000 rounds of ammunition. Later, the newly established Israel Defense Forces ordered more Mauser Karabiner 98k rifles, produced this time by Fabrique Nationale. These have Israeli and Belgian markings on the rifle as well as the emblem of the IDF on the top of the rifle's receiver. The FN-made Karabiner 98k rifles with the IDF markings and emblem on the rifle were produced and sold to Israel after it established itself as an independent nation in 1948. At some point, Israel converted all other Mauser 98-pattern rifles in their inventory (most commonly Czechoslovak vz. 24 rifles, but small numbers of contract Mausers from sources ranging from Ethiopia to Mexico were also known to have come into Israeli hands) to the now standardized Karabiner 98k configuration. The original receiver markings of these conversions were not altered, making it easy for collectors to identify their origin. The Israeli Karabiner 98k utilized the same bayonet design as in German service, with a barrel ring added. Swedish Gevär m/40 rifles were converted to the 7.92×57mm Mauser round. The Israeli bayonets were a mix of converted German production and domestically produced examples.

During the late 1950s, the IDF converted the calibre of their Mauser Karabiner 98k rifles from the original German 7.92×57mm Mauser round to 7.62×51mm NATO following the adoption of the FN FAL rifle as their primary rifle in 1958. The Israeli Mauser Karabiner 98k rifles that were converted have "7.62" stamped on the rifle receiver. Rifles with original German stocks have "7.62" burned into the heel of the rifle stock for identification and to separate the 7.62×51mm NATO rifles from the original 7.92×57mm Mauser versions of the weapon still in service or held in reserve. Some Karabiner 98k rifles were fitted with new, unnumbered beech stocks of recent manufacture, while others retained their original furniture. All of these converted rifles were proof-fired for service. The IDF employed a 22 mm rifle grenade adapter for the Mauser Karabiner 98k rifle.

The Karabiner 98k rifle was used by the reserve branches of the IDF well into the 1960s and 1970s and saw action in the hands of various support and line-of-communications troops during the 1967 Six-Day War and the 1973 Arab-Israeli War. After the rifle was retired from reserve military service, the Israeli Mauser Karabiner 98k was given to a number of third-world nations as military aid by Israel during the 1970s and 1980s, and sold as ex-military surplus on the open market, with many Israeli Mausers being exported to Australia (the Israeli Mauser is the most predominant variant of the Mauser Kar98k rifle on the Australian surplus firearms market today) and North America during the 1970s and 1980s. The Israeli Mausers provided to third world armies began to be exported for civilian sale, and tend to be in significantly worse condition than those sold directly out of Israeli storage.

== Contemporary use ==
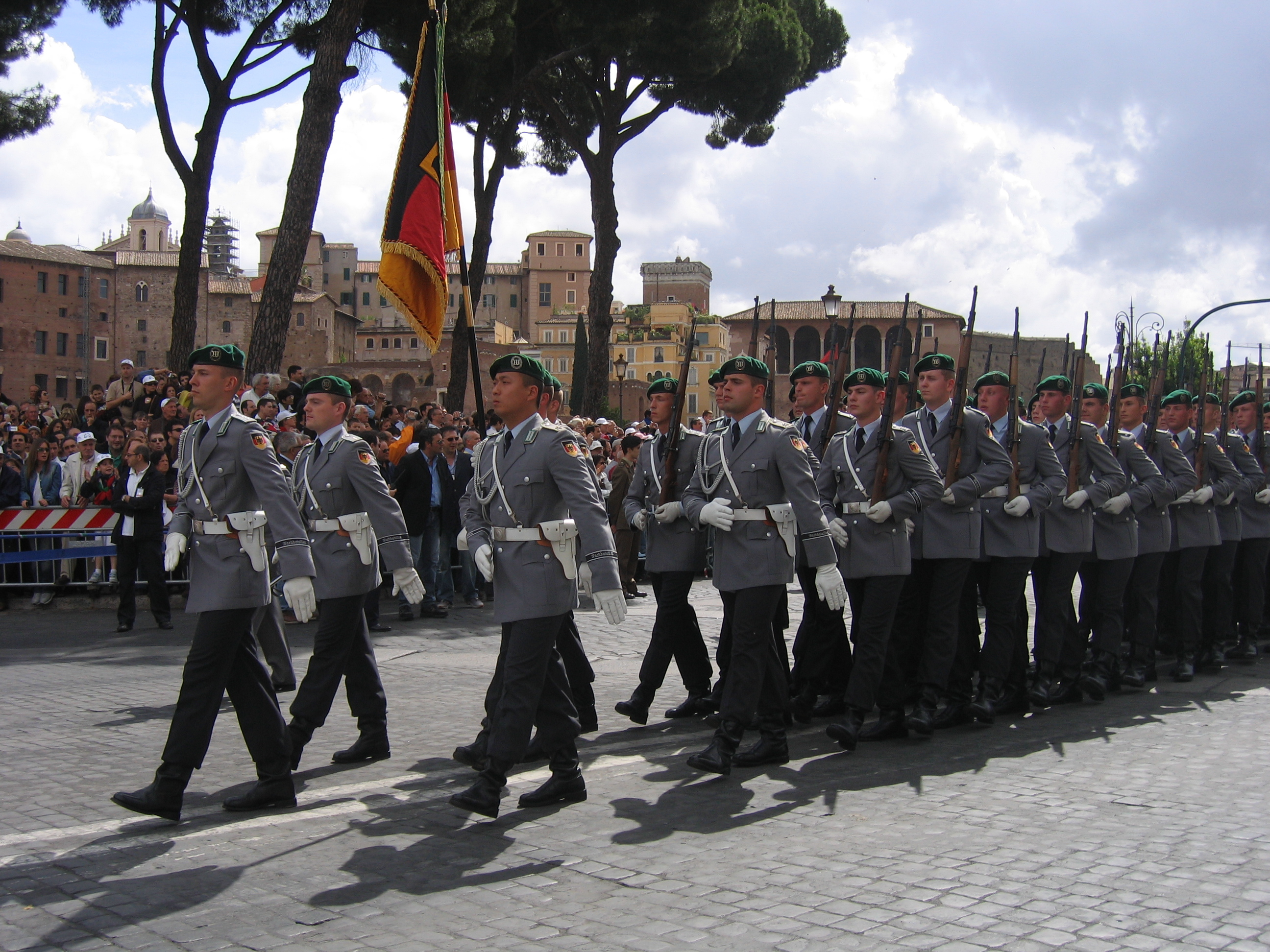
Wachbataillon soldiers marching with Karabiner 98k rifles in 2007

The Bundeswehr still uses the Karabiner 98k in the Wachbataillon for military parades and show acts. In 1995, remaining swastikas and other Nazi-era markings were removed from these rifles, after criticism regarding the presence of such symbols on Wachbataillon kit by the Social Democratic Party.

During the 1990s, the Yugoslav Karabiner 98k rifles and the Yugoslav M48 Mauser and M48A rifles were used alongside modern automatic and semi-automatic rifles by all the warring factions of the Yugoslav Wars. There are a number of photographs taken during the war in Bosnia, showing combatants and snipers using Yugoslavian-made Mauser rifles from high-rise buildings in the Bosnian city of Sarajevo.

After 2003, the German Karabiner 98k rifle (along with the Russian Mosin–Nagant, the British Lee–Enfield and the Yugoslavian M48 Mauser) was encountered in Iraq by US and Coalition forces with Iraqi insurgents making use of the Karabiner 98k and other bolt-action rifles alongside more modern infantry weapons like the AK-47 and SKS rifles. Many Third World nations still have Karabiner 98k rifles in their arsenals as they had been given as military aid by the USSR; for instance, Tuaregs of the People's Movement for the Liberation of Azawad used the rifle during the Tuareg rebellion (1990–1995).

== Civil use ==
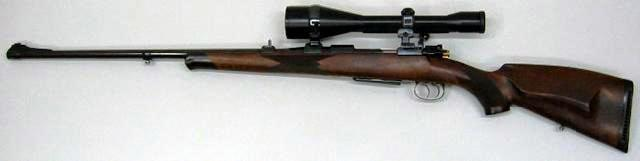
Mauser Karabiner 98k based hunting rifle

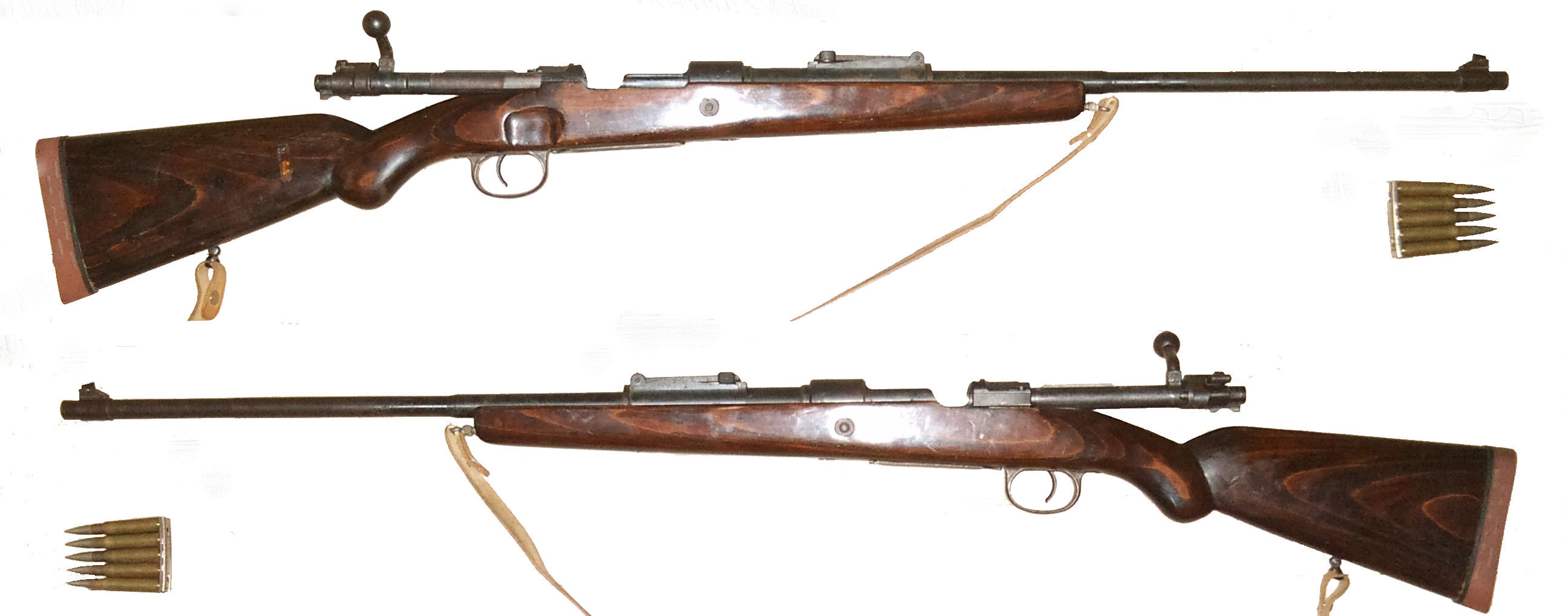
Privately owned Mauser Karabiner 98 kurz modified as hunting rifle, modifications have probably been made shortly after World War II

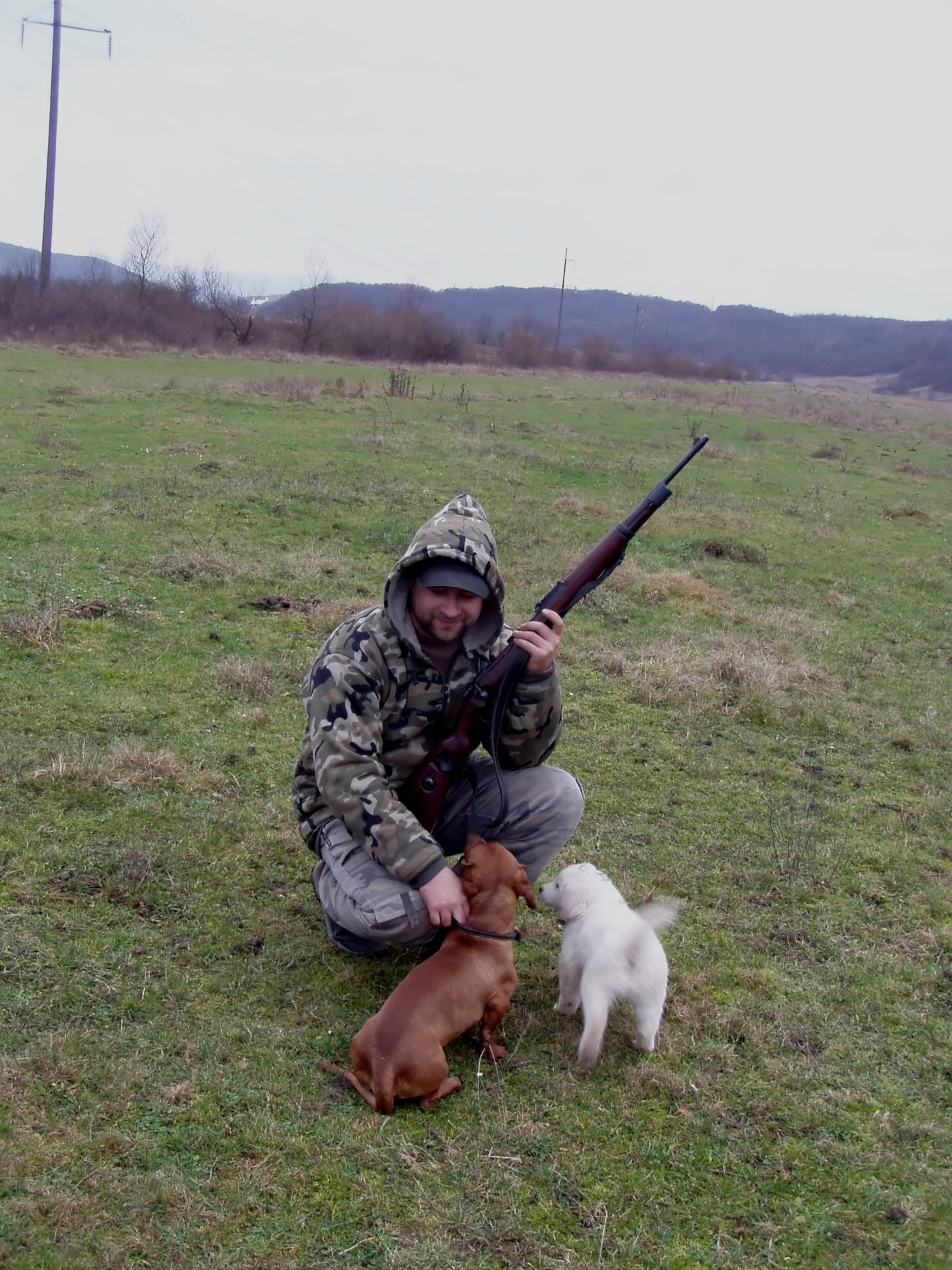
Hunter in Zakarpattia Oblast with a Karabiner 98k in 2010

The Karabiner 98k rifles that were used by Germany during World War II are highly sought after collector's items in many circles. The Mauser Karabiner 98k rifle remains popular among many rifle shooters and military rifle collectors due to the rifle's historical background, as well as the availability of both new and surplus 7.92×57mm IS ammunition. As of 2010, the Mauser Karabiner 98k rifles that were captured by the Soviets during World War II and refurbished during the late 1940s and early 1950s have appeared in large numbers on the military surplus rifle market. These have proven popular with buyers in the United States and Canada, ranging from ex-military rifle collectors to target shooters and survivalists, due to the unique history behind the Soviet capture of Mauser Karabiner 98k rifles.

The widespread availability of surplus Mauser 98k rifles and the fact that these rifles could, with relative ease, be adapted for hunting and other sport purposes made the Mauser 98k popular amongst civilian riflemen. When German hunters after World War II were allowed again to own and hunt with full bore rifles they generally started to "rearm" themselves with the then abundant and cheap former Wehrmacht service rifles. Civilian users changed these service rifles often quite extensively by mounting telescopic sights, aftermarket hunting stocks, aftermarket triggers and other accessories and changing the original military chambering. Gunsmiths rebarreled or rechambered Mauser 98K rifles for European and American sporting chamberings such as the 6.5×55mm Swedish Mauser, 7×57mm Mauser, 7×64mm, .270 Winchester, .308 Winchester, .30-06 Springfield, 8×60mm S, 8×64mm S, etc. The magnum hunting cartridges 6.5×68mm, 8×68mm S and 9.3×64mm Brenneke were even specially developed by German gunsmiths for the standard military Mauser 98 action.

Surplus Mauser 98K actions were used by Schultz & Larsen in Denmark as the basis for target rifles. The actions had the German markings removed, were refinished in gray phosphate, and new serial numbers and proof marks applied. The Schultz & Larsen M52 and M58 Target Rifles used shortened and refurbished Karabiner 98k stocks. Later versions had new target stocks fitted and were available in .30-06, 6.5×55mm and 7.62mm NATO. Some of these rifles are still in competitive use today although with the benefit of new barrels. Besides conversions of original Karabiner 98k rifles, other sporter variants made by a number of manufacturers such as FN Herstal, Zastava, Santa Barbara (Spain), and many others have been available at various times in a wide variety of chamberings, but most are large-bore hunting calibres.

=== Modern civilian offspring ===
The Mauser-type action is widely held to be the pinnacle of bolt-action rifle design, and the vast majority of modern weapons of this type, both military and civilian, are still based on it to this day. The safety offered by its three-lug bolt and the added reliability of controlled feed (especially favored by dangerous game hunters) are considerable refinements not found in other designs.

Throughout the design's history, standard sized and enlarged versions of the Mauser M 98 system have been produced for the civil market.

John Rigby & Co. commissioned Mauser to develop the M 98 magnum action in the early 1900s. It was designed to function with the large sized cartridges normally used to hunt Big Five game and other species. For this specialized type of hunting, where absolute reliability of the rifle under adverse conditions is very important, the controlled-feed M 98 system remains the standard by which other action designs are judged. In 1911, John Rigby & Co. introduced the .416 Rigby cartridge that due to its dimensions could only be used in the M 98 magnum action.

As of 2010, Zastava Arms manufactured the M48/63 sporting rifle, which is a short-barreled variant of the Model 1948 military rifle and the Zastava M07 sniper rifle.

Since 1999, the production of Mauser M 98 and M 98 Magnum rifles has been resumed in Germany by Mauser Jagdwaffen GmbH (Mauser Huntingweapons Ltd.) according to original drawings of 1936 and the respective Mauser patents.

== Users ==
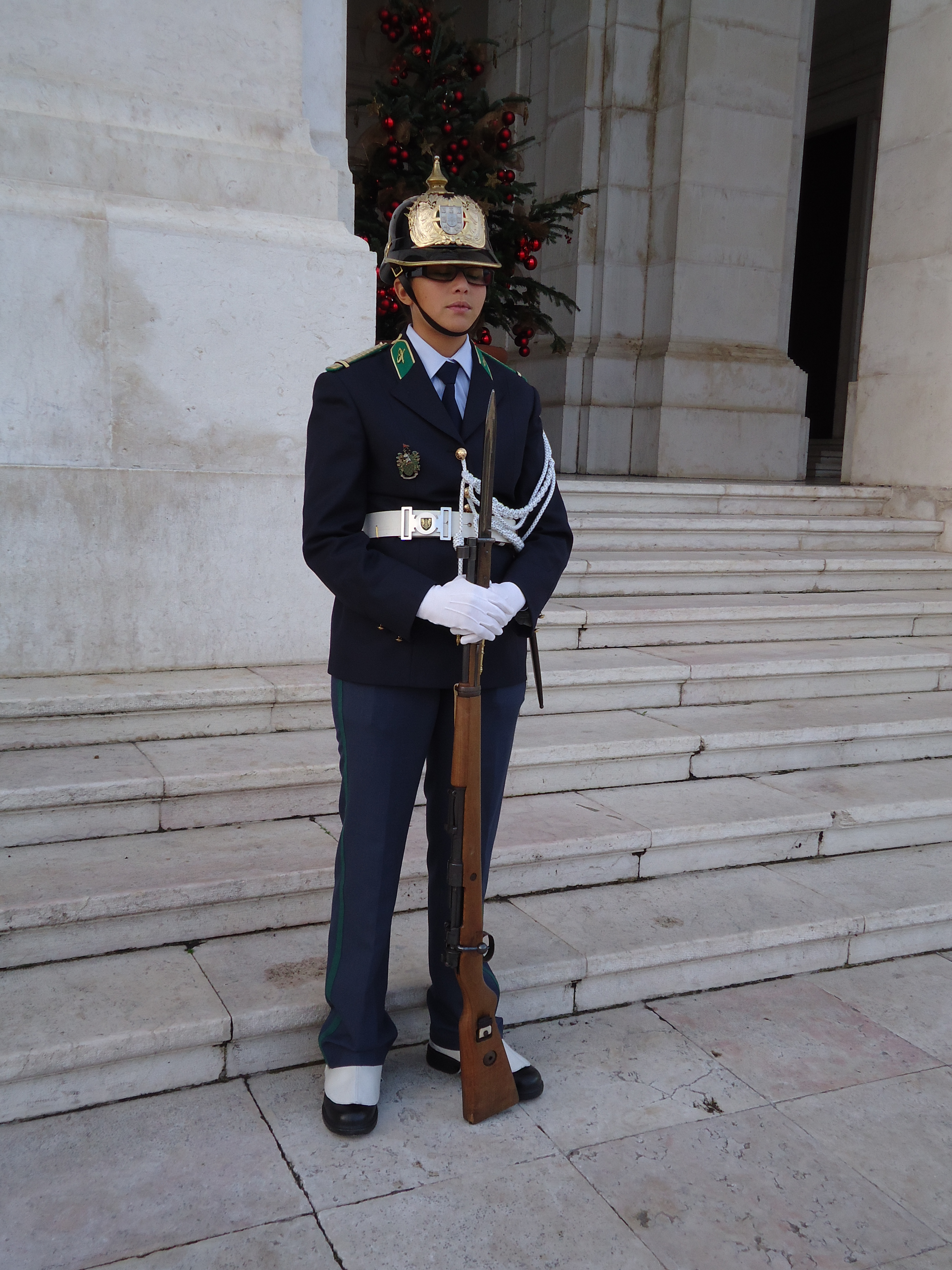
A Portuguese Republican National Guard honor guard with a Kar98k-type Mauser

- Algeria: Used by Armée de Libération Nationale guerrillas
- Austria: Used in both regular karabiner and marksman SSG 98k with a 4x Kahles scope Zf58 variants.
- Bolivia: Czech-made Modelo B-50
- Republic of China: The Chinese Nationalist Government imported Karabiner 98k rifle, as they had with the Mauser Standardmodell before it, also producing a licensed copy of it domestically.
  - Used by National Revolutionary Army, various Chinese Warlords and pro-Japanese Collaborationist Chinese Army
- People's Republic of China: Used by the People's Volunteer Army in the Korean War. Some of the Kar98k rifles the PVA used in Korea were provided as military aid by the USSR.
- Independent State of Croatia: Used in large numbers by both Ustaše Militia and Croatian Home Guard
- Czechoslovakia: Used post-1945
- Denmark
- East Timor: Inherited ex-Portuguese m/937 from the FALINTIL.
- Egypt: obtained from Czechoslovakia
- El Salvador: Kar 98k converted to 7.62×51mm NATO bought before receiving surplus US weapons.
- Ethiopian Empire: Received from Nazi Germany as military aid during the Second Italo-Ethiopian War. Also purchased from the Zbrojovka Brno factory after WWII and marked with special disk in buttstock.
- Finland: Ordered 600 rifles with rifle grenade launchers during World War II as the Finns lacked a domestic rifle grenade launcher for their Mosin–Nagants. Only 100 were used in combat.
- France: Used during and after the war.
- Nazi Germany: Used as the standard-issue rifle for the Wehrmacht.
- West Germany: Used by the Bundeswehr's Wachbataillon
- East Germany: In standard use by the Landstreitkräfte until the 1960s, in occasional use after this. Some also used by the Kampfgruppen der Arbeiterklasse, in addition to some being sent as aid to the Ethiopian Derg Government.
- Guatemala: Bought from Czechoslovakia during Jacobo Arbenz's presidency. During the civil war surplus Israeli rifles were bought and issued to civilian defence patrols
- Iceland
- Indonesia
- Iraq
- Israel
- Italy: some captured by Italian partisans
- Empire of Japan: Used by the Imperial Japanese Navy
- Libya: Used after World War II. Fielded by Libyan Rebels during Libyan Civil War
- Lithuania: Kar98k and other variants of the Mauser 98 were used by Lithuanian anti-soviet partisans (1944-1953). often modified into "obrez" pistols.
- Luxembourg: The Grand Ducal Guard used captured German K98ks in 1945, later replaced by Ross rifles in the same year.
- Mauritania
- Manchukuo: used rifles captured from the Chinese forces
- Netherlands: Post-World War II use.
- Norway Some later converted to K98kF1
- Poland: (captured use)
- Portugal designated m/937
- Kingdom of Romania: 27,000 received from Germany in 1943
- Saudi Arabia: bought 1,000 Kar 98ks in the 1960s, probably to supply proxy forces.
- Serbia
  - Government of National Salvation
- (Slovak Republic (1939–1945)) First Slovak Republic
- Soviet Union: (captured use)
- Sweden: Imported 5,000 Kar 98k rifles in 1939.
- Ba'athist Syria
- Tunisia
- Turkey
- North Vietnam
- Yemen
- Socialist Federal Republic of Yugoslavia

=== Non-state users ===
- Armed Forces for the National Liberation of East Timor (FALINTIL): Used ex-Portuguese m/937s.
- (Ethiopian Empire) Ethiopian insurgents: Used captured K 98ks against the Italians from 1941 onwards.
- (Mozambique) FRELIMO: Delivery of 4,800 Karabiner 98k from the German Democratic Republic in 1967
- (Israel) Haganah (in Mandate Palestine)
- (Indonesia) Indonesian insurgents: Used Kar98ks captured from the Dutch during the Indonesian National Revolution.
- (Iraq) Iraqi insurgents
- ISIL: Used by ISIL insurgents in 2019.
- (Provisional Government of the Republic of Korea) Korean Liberation Army
- (Angola) MPLA: Delivery of 1,600 Karabiner 98k from the German Democratic Republic in 1967
- (People's Socialist Republic of Albania) National Liberation Front
- People's Movement for the Liberation of Azawad
- Pro-Indonesia militias in East Timor
- (Second Syrian Republic) Syrian opposition
- Timorese Democratic Union (UDT): Used ex-Portuguese m/937s.
- Viet Cong: Some were ex-French leftovers from the Indochina War, others were Soviet aid provided during the Vietnam War.
- (North Vietnam) Viet Minh
- Yugoslav Partisans: Some later had the receiver markings removed, and the SFRY crest applied postwar.
- Zimbabwe African People's Union: Delivery of 3,200 Karabiner 98k from the German Democratic Republic in 1967

== See also ==
- Chiang Kai-shek rifle
- Karabinek wz. 1929
- M24 series
- vz. 24
