= S84/98 III bayonet =

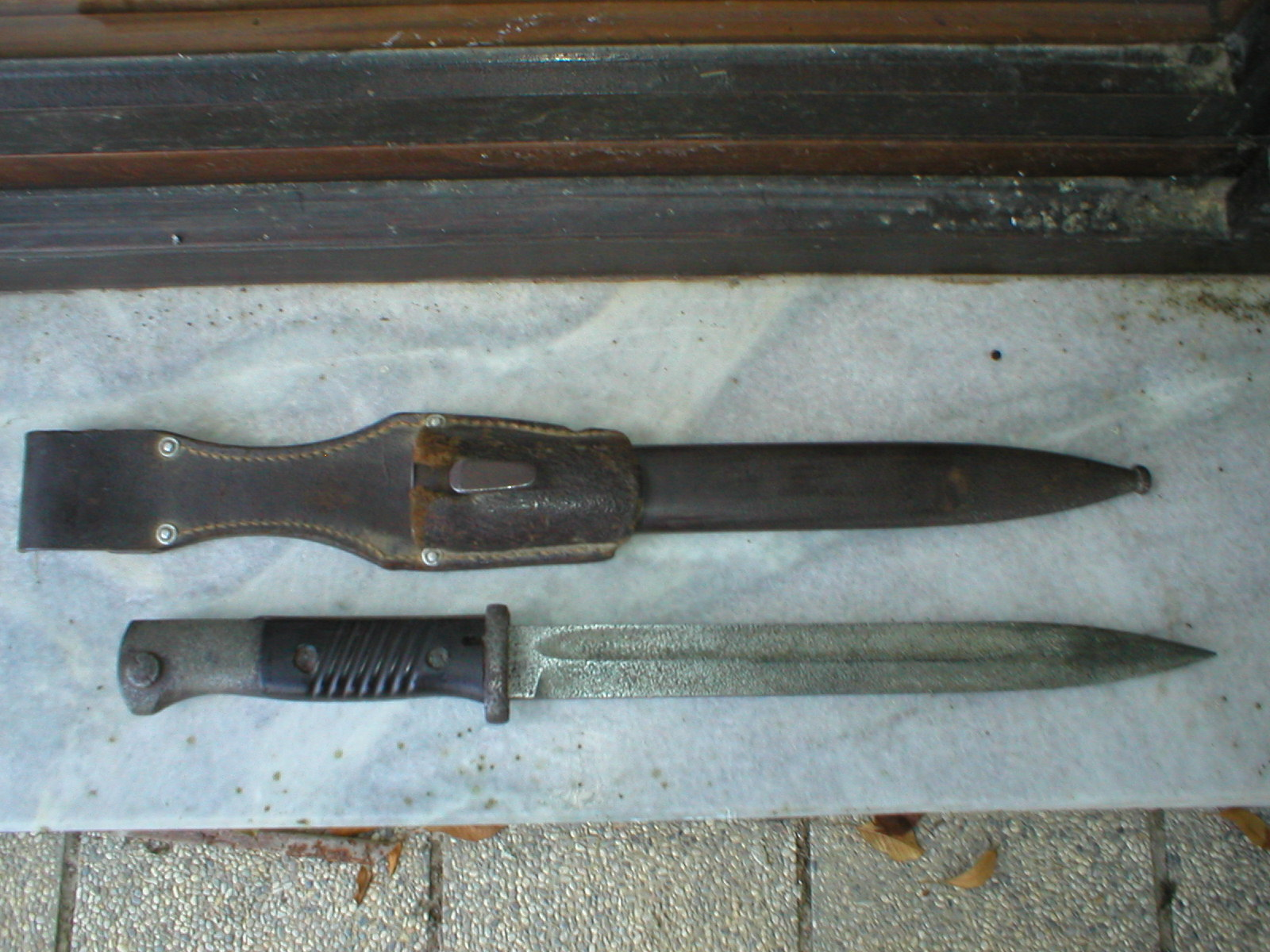
- S84/98 III bayonet for the K98k rifle with bayonet frog.
- Type: Knife bayonet
- Place of origin: German Empire

Service history
- Wars: World War II

Specifications
- Length: 385 mm (15.2 in)
- Blade length: 252 mm (9.9 in)

The S84/98 III was the standard bayonet for the Karabiner 98k rifle.

== History ==
It originates from the 1871/1884 bayonet the first ever standard issue knife bayonet for any army which was adopted in the German Empire for use with the 1871/1884 rifle.

This was a modification of the Mauser Model 1871 the first Mauser rifle which fit it with a 8-round tubular magazine designed by Alfred von Kropatschek.

This was the first repeating rifle of the German armed forces although it was quickly replaced by the Gewehr 1888 made in response to the Lebel Model 1886 rifle, the first rifle to use smokeless powder.

== Design ==
The first pattern of S84/98 or M1884/98 bayonet was the 1871/1884 bayonet adapted so it could be used on the Gewehr 98.

This was replaced in service by the 1898/05 bayonet. However during World War I the S84/98 began to be produced again under the designation S84/98 II.

The German Imperial Army used this bayonet in World War I as a way of conserving scarce resources. The S84/98 III was production of the S84/98 bayonet during the late Weimar period and during the World War II.

The S84/98 III was the last production of the S84/98 German bayonets.

== Production ==
Most production of the bayonet was done by facilities in the Solingen area of Germany.

Besides this other German producers were businesses such as Jos. Corts who made power tools, Adler AG, Dürkopp who made motor vehicles today sewing machine manufacturer Durkopp Adler, Mundlos AG who made sewing machines and major surgical instrument producer Jetter & Scherrer, Aesculap Werke, Tuttlingen.

The bayonet was also produced for Germany abroad in countries they occupied which was done by Genossenshaft Maschinenfabrik, Ferlach in Austria and the famous Manufacture d'armes de Châtellerault in France who made the FM 24/29 light machine gun.

== Users ==
- German Empire
- Weimar Republic
- Nazi Germany

== See also ==
- Seitengewehr 98
