= Zastava M48 =

Puška M.48 7,9 mm (Rifle M.48 7.9 mm)
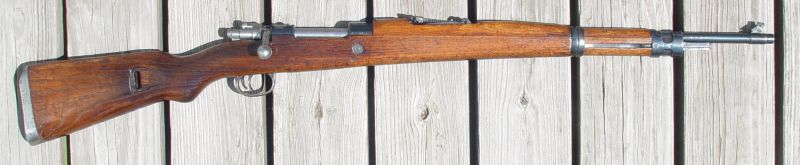
- Type: Bolt-action rifle
- Place of origin: SFR Yugoslavia

Service history
- In service: 1950–1964 (as the standard Yugoslav service rifle)
- Used by: See Users
- Wars: Albanian–Yugoslav border conflict (1948–1954); Lebanese Civil War; Yugoslav Wars; North Kosovo crisis (2022–2026)

Production history
- Designed: 1948
- Produced: 1950–1965
- No. built: 1,224,000+
- Variants: M48, M48A, M48B, M48BO

Specifications
- Mass: 3.9 kg (8.6 lb)
- Length: 1105 mm (43.5 in)
- Barrel length: 597 mm (23.25 in)
- Cartridge: 7.92×57 mm IS (8 mm Mauser)
- Action: Bolt action
- Muzzle velocity: 760 m/s (2,493 ft/s)
- Effective firing range: 500 m (547 yd) (with iron sights); 800+ m (875 yd) (with optics)
- Feed system: 5-round stripper clip, internal box magazine
- Sights: rear: standard V-notch, adjustable to 2,000 meters in 100 m increments front: hooded, inverted V

The Zastava M48 (Serbo-Croatian: Puška M.48 7,9 mm / Пушка M.48 7,9 mm, "Rifle M.48 7.9 mm") is a post World War II Yugoslav version of the Belgian designed M24 series with some influence from German Karabiner 98k. It was the standard service rifle of the Yugoslav People's Army from the early 1950s until its replacement by the Zastava M59/66, a licensed copy of the Soviet SKS semiautomatic carbine, in the early 1960s.

== History ==
After World War II, Yugoslavia took the design of the M24 rifle series and restarted production with minor modifications based on the German Karabiner 98k. Although very similar in external appearance, many of the parts of the Yugoslav and German rifles are not interchangeable, especially the bolt and related action parts. M48s are usually distinguished from the 98k by the top handguard, which extends behind the rear sight and ends just in front of the receiver ring, although this feature exists on other models as well.

The M48 was designed with a stock similar to the 98k, but it has a shorter intermediate-length action and receiver, as does the similar M24 series Mauser. The M24 series Mausers were built from prewar Yugoslav Model 24 Mausers and then refurbished with newer Belgian parts, and usually have straight bolts, while the M48s have curved bolts. Most M48 stocks are made from thicker Elm or Beech wood and have a thick stainless steel butt plate at the rear of the stock.

The M24/47 stocks are mostly made of thinner Walnut or Beech wood and do not have a milled stainless steel "cupped" butt plate. The M48 was also designed to remove the follower from stopping the bolt from closing when the magazine is empty.

== Variants ==
There are five main versions of the M48.

M48: 1950-1952- The initial version of the M48, with full crest and all machined steel parts.

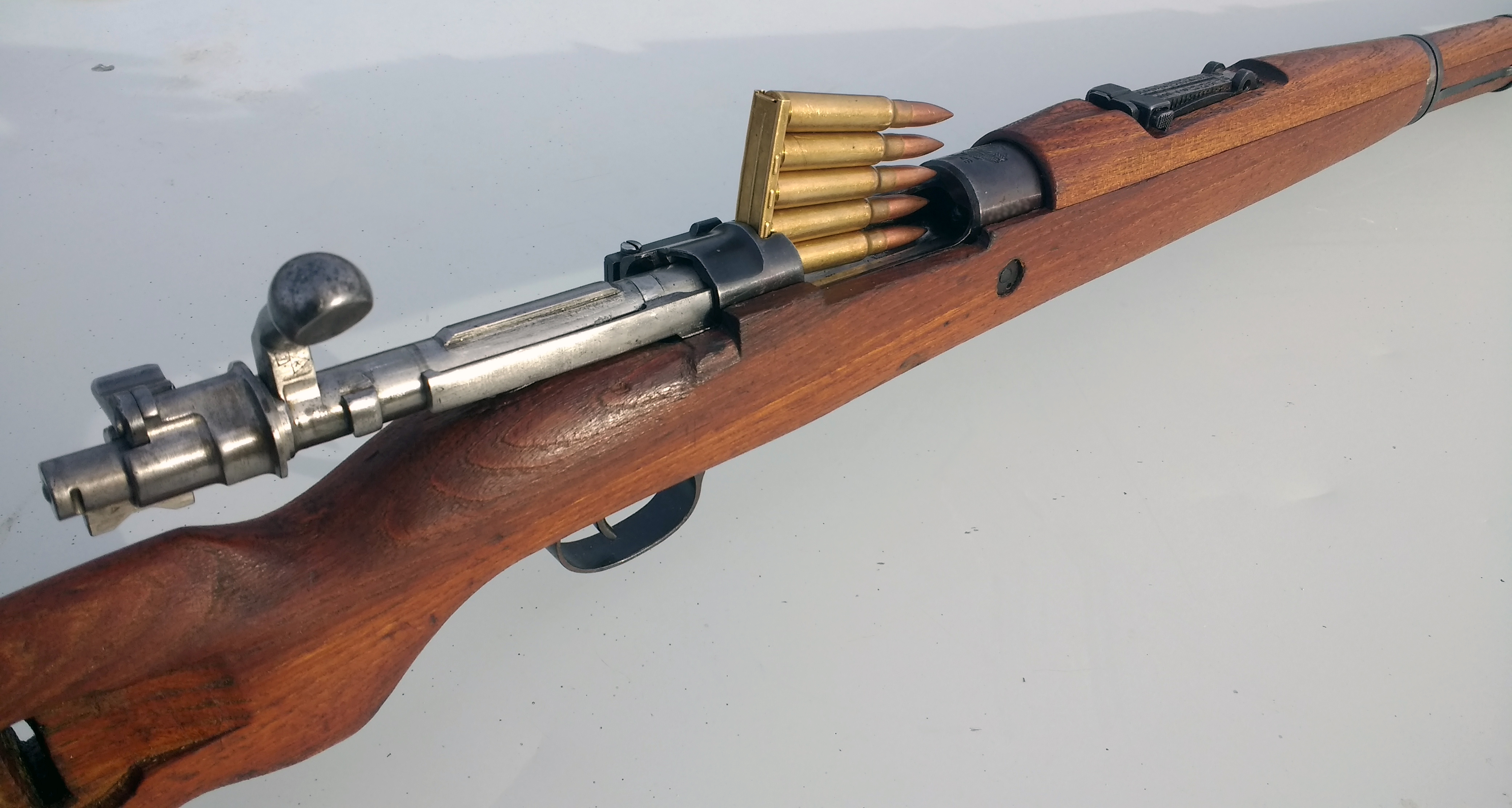
M48 with a brass stripper clip inserted

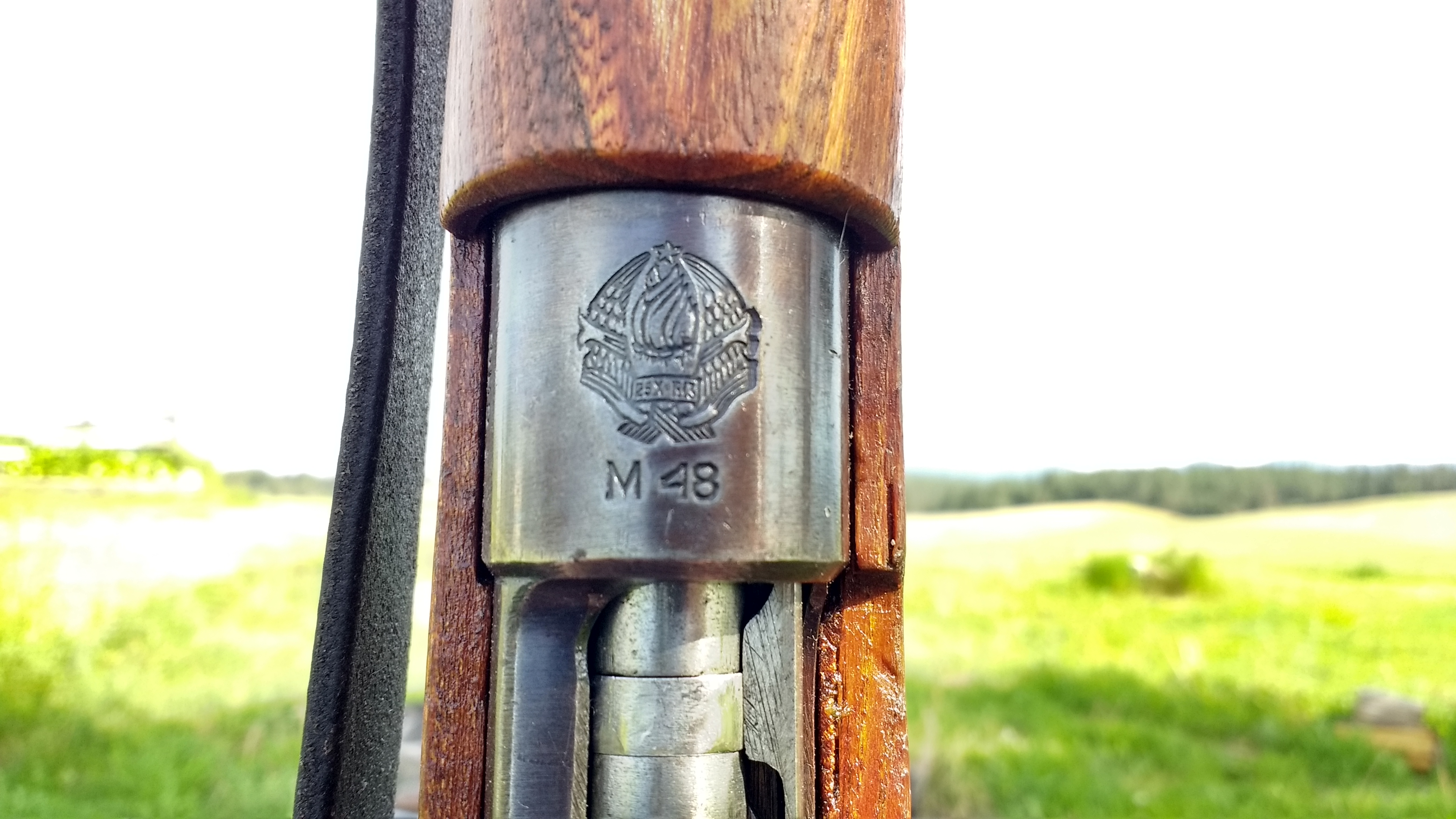
M48 Crest

M48A: 1952-1965- Inclusion of stamped parts. the M48A used sheet metal stampings for the magazine floor plate. These changes sped production while lowering cost. The critical bolt and receiver which contain the pressure of the burning propellant within the cartridge case retained the same material requirements and design tolerances (i.e. were machined from forged steel) in the A and B variations.

M48B: 1956-1965- Additional sheet metal stampings incorporated. The most critical factor to understand about this model is that it continued to be stamped on the receiver ring M48A. There was no change in markings. The specific changes in parts is unverified but include stamped barrel and H-bands and the magazine spring follower. The most significant change and external appearance whereby the M48B may be identified is the trigger guard. Whereas previously, the trigger guard/mag well were machined from a solid billet of steel, it was changed to an assembly fabricated from stamped parts. The new trigger guard has a rib running around the exterior of both sides. While the exact number of changes made to this model have not been specified, the impact on production in 1956 were extensive and drastically reduced the number produced that year. There was a specific reason for this. From 1956 on, all M48 production was intended solely for export.

M48BO: 1956-1965- The "bo" stands for "bez oznake" and translates roughly as "unmarked" or "without markings." These were identical to and manufactured concurrent with the crested M48B but were not stamped with any national or manufacturer's markings.

M48/63: Zastava Arms manufactured the M48/63 sporting rifle which is a short barreled variant of the Model 1948 rifle. The production stopped as of 2013.

== Combat use ==
The M48 rifle, and its variants, has been exported to Burma, Algeria, Chad, Ethiopia, Iraq and Indonesia. Egypt bought M48As to diversify its suppliers in the 1950s. Syria purchased M48A and M48BO rifles.. The M48 was used in the Algerian War of Independence (1954-1962), the Iraq-Iran War (1980-1988), the War in Yugoslavia (1991-2001) and the civil war in Syria (2011-). In the 1980s, Syria sent surplus M48s to pro-Syrian Lebanese factions during the Lebanese Civil War (1975-1990).

After the Breakup of Yugoslavia, the M48 saw use in the Yugoslav Wars, thousands being used by various militias or paramilitary forces. Often the M48 was used as the basis for a sniper rifle, drilled and tapped for the ZRAK 4x32 telescopic sight and mounts. However, other than an experimental batch of approximately 4000 rifles, no official M48 sniper rifle was ever fielded by the Yugoslav Army.

In 2018, the Polish Border Guard obtained 44 rifles for ceremonial purposes due to its physical similarities with Polish pre-WW2 Kb wz. 98a rifles.

== Users ==
- Algeria
- Ba'athist Iraq
- Ba'athist Syria
- Burma
- Chad
- Egypt
- Ethiopia
- Indonesia: M48/63 variant used by Indonesian National Police. Currently used in limited service and training purpose.
- (Lebanon) Various Lebanese militias.
- Poland
- Yugoslavia
