= Anti-tank grenade =

Specialized grenade used against armored targets

Diagram of a Soviet RPG-43 antitank grenade

An anti-tank grenade is a specialized hand-thrown grenade used to defeat armored targets. Although their inherently short range limits the usefulness of grenades, troops can lie in ambush or maneuver under cover to exploit the limited outward visibility of the crew in a target vehicle. Hand launched anti-tank grenades became redundant with the introduction of standoff rocket propelled grenades and man-portable anti-tank systems.

Grenades were first used against armored vehicles during World War I, but it wasn't until World War II when more effective shaped charge anti-tank grenades were produced. AT grenades are unable to penetrate the armor of modern tanks, but may still damage lighter vehicles.

== History ==
The first anti-tank grenades were improvised devices. During World War I the Germans were the first to come up with an improvised anti-tank grenade by taking their regular "potato masher" stick grenade and taping two or three more high explosive heads to create one larger grenade. In combat, after arming, the grenade was thrown on top of the slowly advancing tank where the armor was thin. The destructive properties of the stick grenade relied on its explosive payload, rather than the fragmentation effect, which was advantageous against hard targets.

During World War II, various nations made improvised anti-tank grenades by putting a number of defensive high explosive grenades into a sandbag. Due to their weight, these were normally thrown from very close range or directly placed in vulnerable spots onto an enemy vehicle. Another method used by the British Home Guard in 1940 was to place dynamite or some other high explosive in a thick sock and cover the lower part with axle grease and then place the grease covered part in a suitable size tin can. The sock was pulled out, the fuse lit and the sock thrown against the side of the tank turret in the hope it would stick until the explosion. If successful, it caused internal spalling of the armor plate, killing or injuring the tank crew inside. It is unknown if this type of improvised anti-tank grenade was ever successfully employed in combat. By late 1940, the British had brought into production a purpose-built adhesive anti-tank grenade - known as the "sticky bomb" - that was not very successful in combat. In Vietnam, the lunge mine was used in First Indochina War, specifically the Battle of Hanoi, during which Battalion Commander Nguyen Van Thieng tried to use it; however, "the bombs failed to explode. In the end, he was shot and heroically sacrificed".

When tanks overran entrenchments, hand grenades could be, and were, used by infantry as improvised anti-tank mines by placing or throwing them in the path of a tank in the hope of disabling a track. While this method was used in desperation, it usually proved more dangerous to the soldier on the ground than to the crew of the tank.

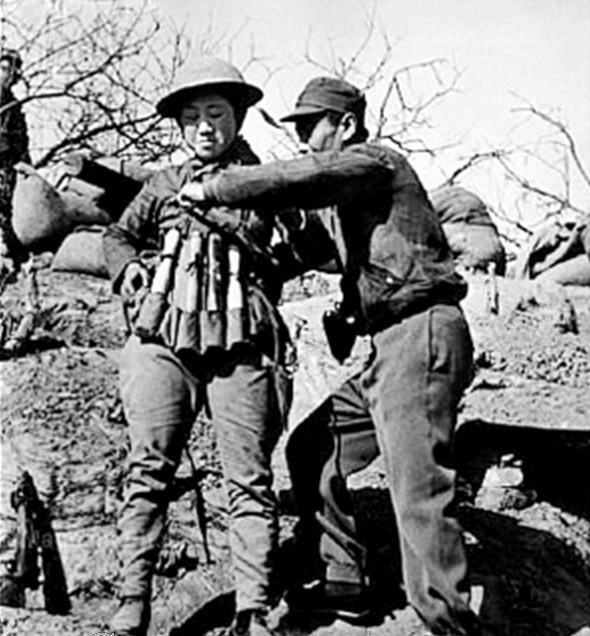
Chinese suicide bomber putting on an explosive vest made out of Model 24 hand grenades to use in an attack on Japanese tanks at the Battle of Taierzhuang

Chinese troops in the Second Sino-Japanese War used suicide bombing against Japanese tanks. Chinese troops strapped explosives like grenade packs or dynamite to their bodies and threw themselves under Japanese tanks to blow them up. This tactic was used during the Battle of Shanghai, where a Chinese suicide bomber stopped a Japanese tank column by exploding himself beneath the lead tank, and at the Battle of Taierzhuang where dynamite and grenades were strapped on by Chinese troops who rushed at Japanese tanks and blew themselves up. During one incident at Taierzhuang, Chinese suicide bombers obliterated four Japanese tanks with grenade bundles.

Purpose-designed anti-tank grenades generally use the shaped charge principle to penetrate tank armor, although the high-explosive squash head (HESH) concept is also used. In military terminology, warheads employing shaped charges are called high-explosive anti-tank (HEAT) warheads. Because of the way shaped charges function, the grenade must hit the vehicle at an exact right angle for the effect to work most efficiently. The grenade design may ensure this by deploying a small drogue parachute or fabric streamers after being thrown, or improvised stabilisation fins if dropped from a drone.

Britain put the first purpose-built anti-tank grenade into the field during the Second World War in late 1940 with the No 68 AT Grenade, which was one of the first "any" type anti-tank weapons of the shape charge or HEAT type. The No 68 was fired from a rifle using the Mills grenade cup launcher. The Type 68 had a penetration of 50 mm (2.0 in) of armor plating, which was astonishing for 1940. Also developed by the UK during the war was the No 74 ST Grenade, popularly known as the "sticky bomb", in which the main charge was held in a glass sphere covered in adhesive. In anticipation of a German invasion, the British Army asked for ideas for a simple, easy to use, ready for production and cheap close-in antitank weapon. The ST Grenade was a government sponsored initiative, by MIR(c), a group tasked with developing weapons for use in German and Italian occupied territory, and they placed the ST Grenade into mass production at Churchill's insistence, but seeing how it was operated, the British Army rejected it for the Home Guard much less their regular forces.

The No 74 Grenade was later issued to troops as an emergency stop-gap measure against lightly armored Italian tanks in North Africa, where it proved—to the surprise of many—highly effective. Later in the war, French partisans used the No 74 effectively in sabotage work against German installations. The Hawkins grenade (No 75) was yet another anti-tank grenade that could be thrown or strung together in a chain and employed in a road-block.

Shortly after the German invasion of Russia in 1941, the Germans introduced the Panzerwurfmine(L), an extremely lethal close-quarter HEAT anti-tank grenade that could destroy the heaviest armored tanks in the war. The grenade was tossed overhand to land atop the tank. After release by the thrower, three spring-out canvas fins stabilized it during its short flight. The Panzerwurfmine(L) was lethal, and inexpensive to manufacture, but required considerable skill to throw accurately and was issued only to specially trained infantry tank-killer teams.

It did not take long after the Russians captured the German Panzerwurfmine(L) to come out with their own hand-thrown anti-tank grenade with a HEAT warhead. In 1940, they developed a crude anti-tank grenade that used the simple blast effect of a large high explosive charge, designated RPG-40, which was stabilized in flight by a ribbon released after it was thrown. The RPG-43 (developed in late 1943) was a modified RPG-40 with a cone liner and a large number of fabric ribbons for flight stabilization after release. In the last year of the war, they introduced the RPG-6, a total redesign of the RPG-43 with an improved kite-tail drogue in the handle and a standoff for the HEAT warhead, drastically increasing both accuracy and penetration, which was reported to be over 100 mm (3.9 in), more than adequate to cause catastrophic damage to any tank if it impacted the top. The Russian RPG-43 and RPG-6 were far simpler to use in combat than the German Panzerwurfmine(L) and did not require extensive training.

A special chapter of German anti-tank grenade is the "Geballte Ladung" (massed load). It is not a singular grenade model but some normal handgrenades which were linked to each other (multiple High Explosive loads in one stick grenade). Another such German attempt at man-portable AT weapons was the "Hafthohlladung" (attachable shaped charge). It was a large shaped charge equipped with three magnets so it would stick to a tank, but it was too heavy to be thrown: it had to be stuck to the target area of a tank directly.

After the end of World War Two, many eastern European nations engineered their own versions of the RPG-6, such as the Hungarian AZ-58-K-100. These were manufactured in the tens of thousands and given to 'armies of national liberation', seeing combat worldwide, including with the Egyptian Army during 1967 and 1973.

The first Japanese anti-tank grenade was a hand-thrown grenade known as the Type 3 grenade, which had a simple 100 mm (3.9 in) diameter cone HEAT warhead with a simple "all the way" fuse system in the base. (If dropped accidentally with the pin removed, it would explode). It had what looked like the end of a mop head on the tail end of the warhead. A soldier would remove the antitank grenade from its sack, pull the pin, and throw it gripping the mop-head as the handle. This was dangerous, as there was no arming safety after release and the thrower could strike something in his back swing before release. Penetration was reportedly only around 50 mm (2.0 in).

The second Japanese anti-tank grenade, a suicide weapon, was nicknamed the "lunge mine". This weapon was a very large HEAT warhead on a five-foot stick. The soldier rammed it forward into the tank or other target, which broke a shear wire that allowed a strike pin to impact a primer and detonate the large HEAT warhead—destroying both soldier and target. While crude, the Japanese lunge mine had six inches (150 mm) of penetration, the greatest penetration of any anti-tank grenades of World War Two.

The U.S. Army first encountered the hand-thrown anti-tank grenade in 1944, in the Philippines (some believe they were locally manufactured). The later suicide lunge mine first appeared during the U.S. invasion of Saipan and the subsequent invasion of Okinawa. Tens of thousands of these crude devices were produced and issued to both regular units and home-guard units on the home islands of Japan before the war ended.

External images
- US Army Early 1980s HAG Concept
- Details of HAG concept (US Army)
- Details of Combat Use of HAG (US Army)

In the late 1970s, the U.S. Army was worried about the lack of emergency anti-tank weapons for issue to its rear area units, to counter isolated enemy armored vehicles infiltrating or being air dropped. When the U.S. Army asked for ideas, engineers at U.S. Army laboratories suggested the reverse-engineered and additional safety improvements of the East German AZ-58-K-100 HEAT anti-tank grenade that had been clandestinely obtained. This concept was called "HAG" for "High-explosive Antiarmor Grenade". While the civilian engineers working for the U.S. Army thought it was a great idea, it was rejected out of hand by almost all senior U.S. Army officers with field experience, who thought it would be more dangerous to the troops who used them than the enemy. The idea was quietly shelved by 1985. This decision left many rear-area U.S. units with no heavier "anti-tank weapon" than the M2 heavy machine gun.

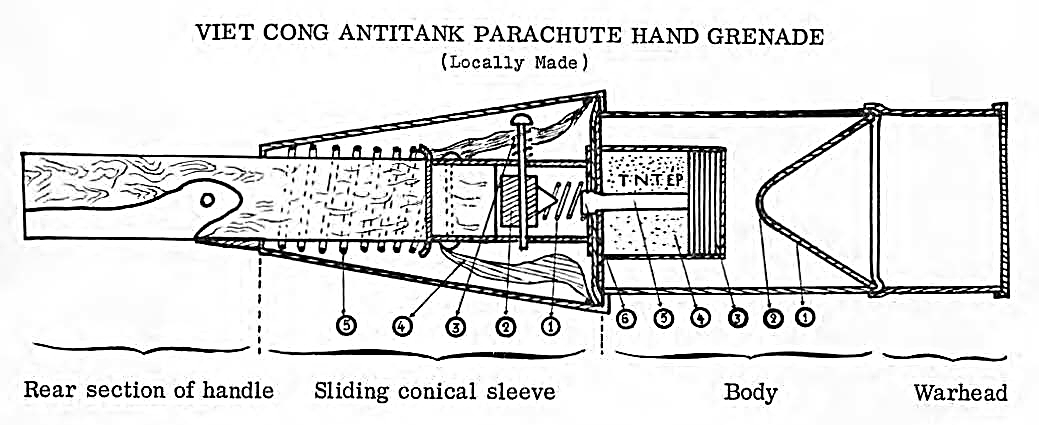
Viet Cong Antitank Parachute Hand Grenade (Locally Made).

Shaped-charge anti-tank hand grenades have been improvised by some non-state actors. One example is an anti-tank hand grenade built by the Viet Cong during the Vietnam War, classified by U.S. intelligence under the name "Viet Cong Antitank Parachute Hand Grenade (Locally Made)". Another example is an anti-tank hand grenade built by the Provisional Irish Republican Army (PIRA), called "Improvised Anti-Armour Grenade (IAAG)".

== Modern usage ==
The most widely distributed anti-tank grenades today are the post World War Two Russian designs of the 1950s and 1960s, mainly the RKG-3.

During the Iran–Iraq War, the 13 year old Iranian soldier Mohammad Hossein Fahmideh was celebrated as a war hero after he blew himself up under an Iraqi tank with a grenade.

Due to improvements in modern tank armor and the invention of rocket propelled grenades, anti-tank hand grenades are generally considered obsolete. However, in the recent Iraq War, the RKG-3 anti-tank hand grenade has made a reappearance with Iraqi insurgents who used them primarily against U.S. Humvees, Strykers and MRAPs, which lack the heavier armor of tanks. This has in turn led the U.S. to adopt countermeasures such as modifications to MRAP and Stryker vehicles by the fitting of slat armor, which causes the anti-tank grenade to detonate before coming in contact with the vehicle.

The RKG-3 grenade has also been seen in use by the Aerorozvidka unit of the Ukrainian military in the 2022 Russian invasion of Ukraine. PJSC Mayak modifies the grenade into the RKG 1600 by changing the fuze timing and adding 3D printed fins to stabilise its flight when dropped from a commercial drone.
