= RPG-40 =

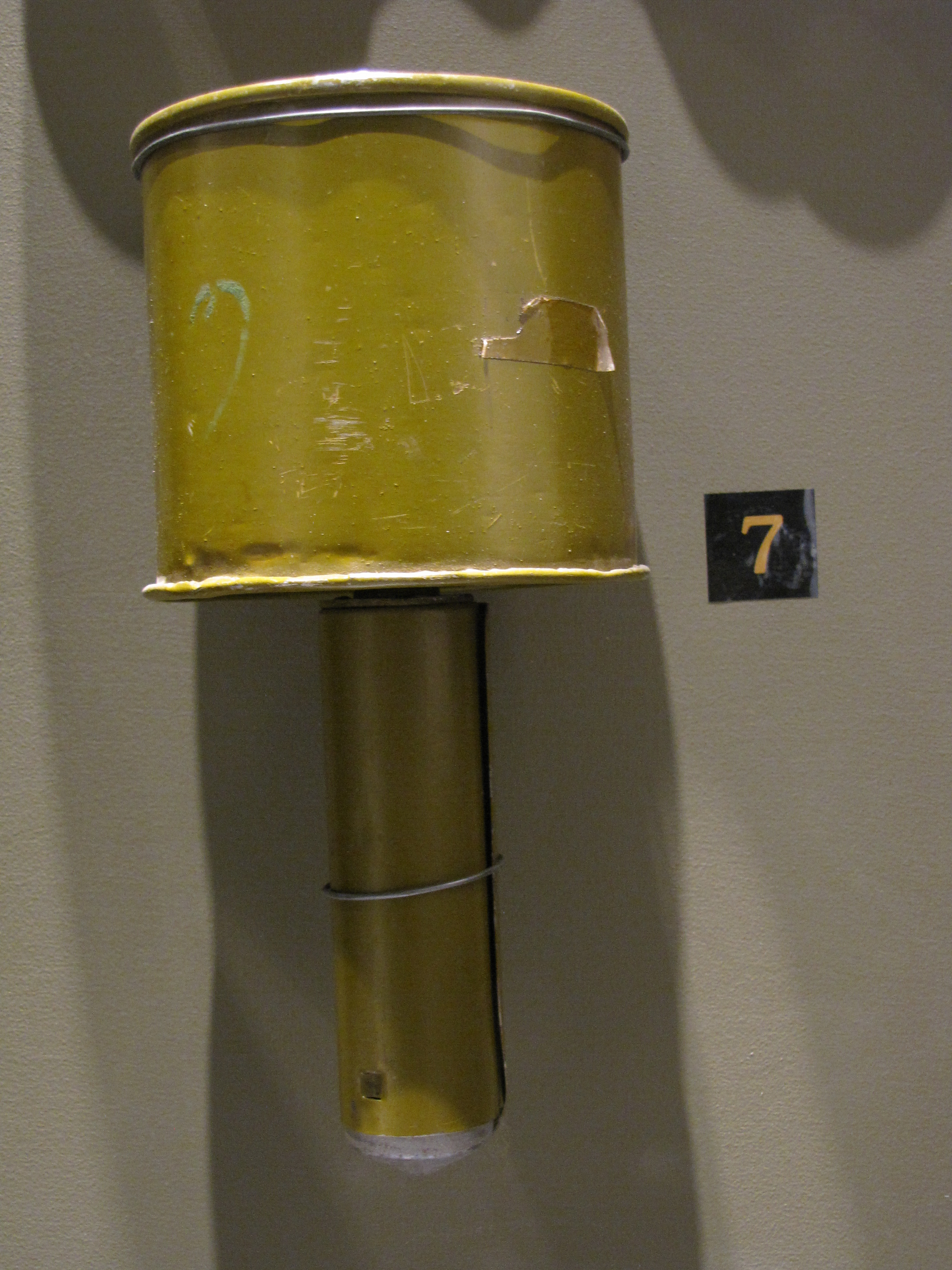
- Soviet RPG-40 anti-tank grenade
- Type: Anti-tank grenade
- Place of origin: Soviet Union

Service history
- In service: 1940−1945 (Soviet Union)
- Used by: See Users
- Wars: World War II, Vietnam War

Production history
- Designer: M. I. Puzirev
- Designed: 1940
- Produced: since July 1941

Specifications
- Mass: 1.2 kilograms (2.6 lb)
- Length: 20 centimetres (7.9 in)
- Effective firing range: 20–25 metres (22–27 yd)
- Filling: TNT
- Filling weight: 0.760 kg (1.68 lb)
- Detonation mechanism: Impact fuze

The RPG-40 (Russian: ручная противотанковая граната образца 1940 года, romanized: Ruchnaya Protivotankovaya Granata Obraztsa 1940 Goda, lit. 'Hand anti-tank grenade model 1940') was an anti-tank hand grenade developed by the Soviet Union in 1940.

== Description ==
The RPG-40 is a blast anti-tank grenade, with a detonator fitted into a recess in the head of the grenade. Its stabilized in flight by a cloth ribbon which unfolds after being thrown.

Upon contact, 760 grams (1.68 lb) of explosives contained within it were detonated and produced a blast effect. This enabled about 20–25 mm (0.79–0.98 in) of armour to be penetrated and caused secondary damage, such as spalling, on contact with thicker armour.

Due to its heavy weight, the grenade could only be thrown at very short ranges, around 20–25 metres (22–27 yd) and behind protected positions, due to the blast and secondary fragmentation effect. According to Jane's, the grenade had an effective fragmentation radius of 20 m (22 yd).

It was also used against enemy defensive positions such as bunkers, machine gun nests, and pillboxes.

== History ==
The RPG-40 was distributed to Red Army units in 1940, a year before the Great Patriotic War.

In July 1941, Main Artillery Directorate issued an order to begin mass production of these grenades as soon as possible. The production was organized by engineer S. Novikov.

It was effective against lightly armoured vehicles such as the Panzer I and Panzer II, but quickly became obsolete once the Germans started deploying heavier and better armoured tanks.

In March 1943, RPG-40 grenades were tested on a German Pz.Kpfw. VI "Tiger" heavy tank (which was captured by Red Army on the Volkhov Front). As a result, it was found that the RPG-40 can destroy the Tiger's tracked treads, but is no longer able to penetrate its thick side armor.

After that, the RPG-40 was replaced by the RPG-43 and RPG-6, both designs used a shaped charge warhead to provide better penetration, but it remained in use as an anti-personnel (despite its short range) and anti-bunker weapon.

== Adoption ==
A marginally effective design capable of penetrating about 20–25 millimetres (0.79–0.98 in) of steel armour, it was soon replaced by the RPG-43 and later the RPG-6, both used shaped charges to increase penetration.

Despite becoming quickly obsolete, the grenade remained in service post-war as an anti-personnel weapon, and it was also effective against defensive positions such as bunkers or machine gun nests.

In the post-war period, surplus grenades were supplied to Warsaw Pact countries. These were used by regular army units as late as 1960, and remained in use with militia units as late as 1987.

During the Vietnam War, the Soviets supplied North Vietnam with RPG-40, RPG-43, and RPG-6 anti-tank grenades.

== Users ==
- Albania
- East Germany
- Poland
- Soviet Union
- Vietnam

== See also ==
- List of Russian weaponry
- No. 73 Grenade

== Bibliography ==
- Department of the Army, United States (1960). Handbook on the Satellite Armies. Washington, DC: Headquarters, Department of the Army.
- Embassy of Vietnam, United States (20 April 1971). "The Soviet Role in North Viet-Nam's Offensive". Vietnam Bulletin. VII (7). Embassy of Viet-Nam.: 17−23.
- Hogg, Ian V, ed. (1987). Jane's Infantry Weapons, 1987-88. Jane's Information Group. ISBN 978-0-7106-0843-7.
- McNab, Chris (2017). German Soldier vs Soviet Soldier: Stalingrad 1942–43. Bloomsbury Publishing. ISBN 978-1-4728-2458-5.
- Rottman, Gordon L. (2013). World War II Infantry Anti-Tank Tactics. Bloomsbury Publishing. ISBN 978-1-4728-0541-6.
- Rottman, Gordon L. (2015). The Hand Grenade. Bloomsbury Publishing. ISBN 978-1-4728-0735-9.
- Yelshin, Colonel N. (October 1981). Kuchin, Valentin (ed.). "Hand Grenades". Soviet Military Review (10). Moscow: Krasnaya Zveda Publishing House.: 30−31.
