= Panzerknacker =

Panzerknacker, a German word meaning 'Armour Breaker', can refer to the following:

- German name for the Disney characters Beagle Boys
- The Hafthohlladung, a German anti-tank grenade used in World War II
- The nickname of Heinrich von Vietinghoff (1887–1952), General (Generaloberst) of the German army during the in World War II
- The popular German nickname for the soldiers awarded by Tank Destruction Badge during World War II
- The Henschel Hs 129, a World War II ground attack aircraft fielded by the Luftwaffe
- The name of a bonus level and character in the video game Medal of Honor: Underground
- Der Panzerknacker: Anleitung für den Panzernahkämpfer. The military manual brochure published by German OKH in 1944.
