= Whipple shield =

Impact shield to protect spacecraft from micrometeoroids and orbital debris

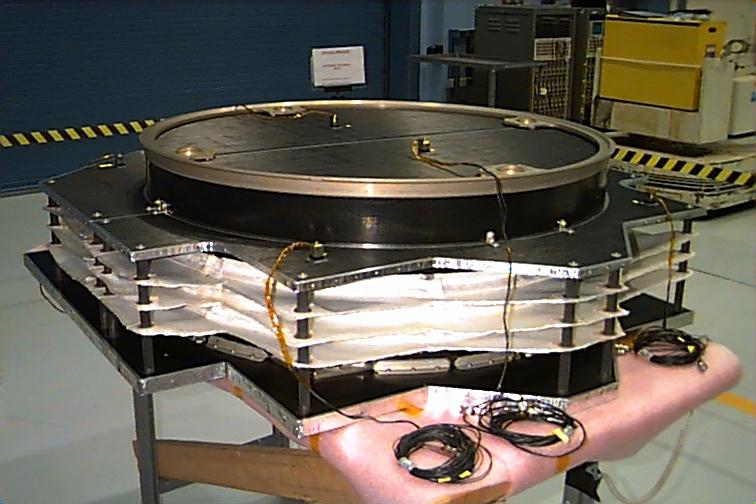
Whipple shield used on NASA's Stardust probe

The Whipple shield or Whipple bumper is a type of spaced armor shielding, invented by Fred Whipple, designed to protect crewed and uncrewed spacecraft from hypervelocity collisions with micrometeoroids and orbital debris. Relative velocities of objects in earth orbit can range as high as 18 kilometers per second (11.2 miles per second), meaning even very small objects can damage spacecraft. According to NASA, the Whipple shield is designed to withstand collisions with debris up to 1 cm.

== Shield design ==
In contrast to monolithic shielding of early spacecraft, Whipple shields consist of a relatively thin outer bumper spaced some distance from the main spacecraft wall. The bumper is not expected to stop the incoming particle or even remove much of its energy, but to break up and disperse it, dividing the original particle energy among many fragments that fan out between bumper and wall. The original particle energy is spread more thinly over a larger wall area, which is more likely to withstand it. Although a Whipple shield lowers total spacecraft mass compared to a solid shield (always desirable in spaceflight), the extra enclosed volume may require a larger payload fairing.

There are several variations on the simple Whipple shield. Multi-shock shields, like the one used on the Stardust spacecraft, use multiple bumpers spaced apart to increase the shield's ability to protect the spacecraft. Whipple shields that have a filling between the rigid layers of the shield are called stuffed Whipple shields. The filling in these shields is usually a high-strength material like Kevlar or Nextel aluminium oxide fiber. The type of shield, the material, thickness and distance between layers are varied to produce a shield with minimal mass that will also minimize the probability of penetration. There are over 100 shield configurations on the International Space Station alone, with important and high-risk areas having better shielding.

== See also ==
- Double hull
- Space debris
- Spaced armor
