= Spaced armour =

Armour with plates spaced a distance apart

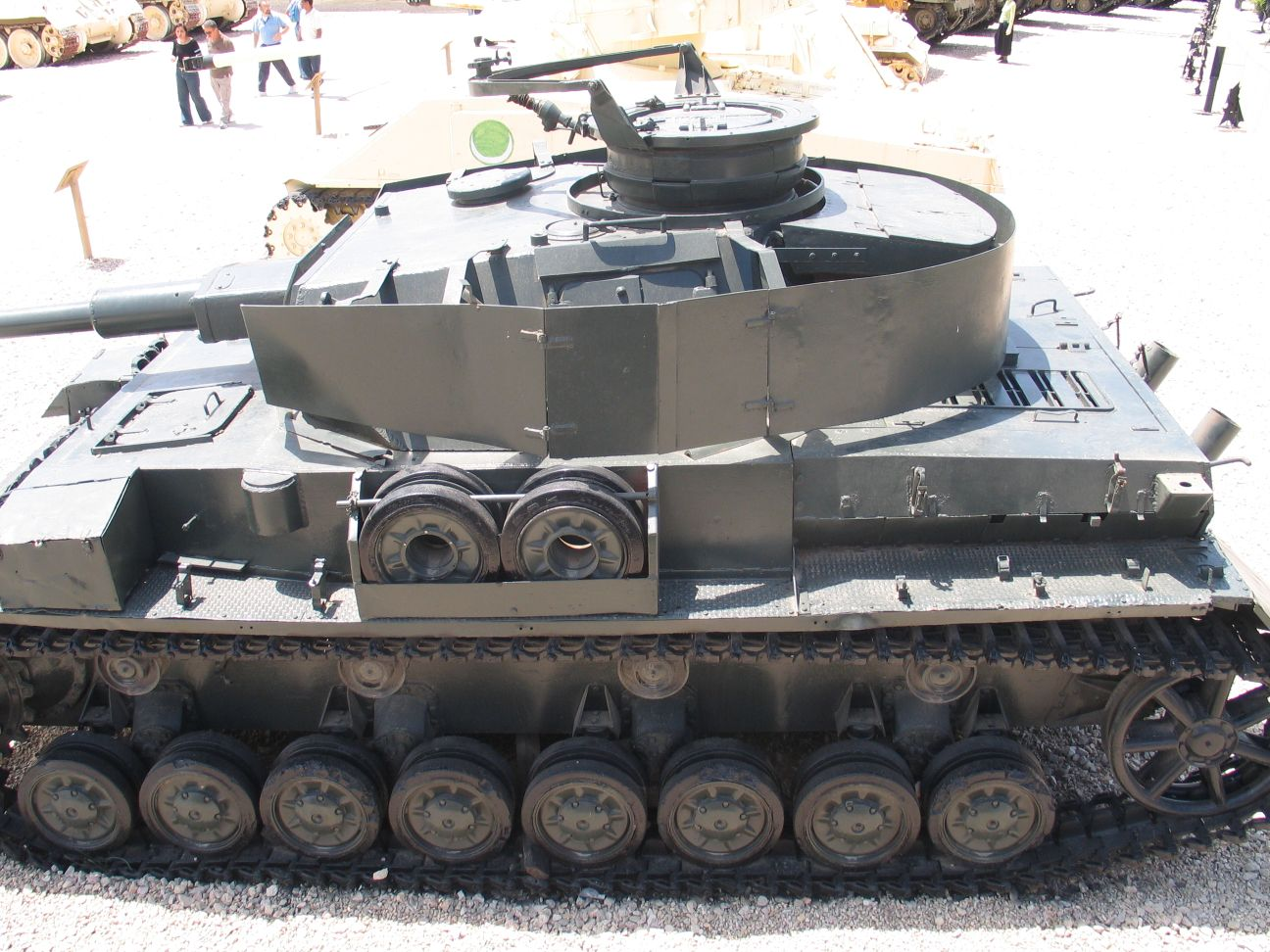
Spaced armour around the turret of a PzKpfw IV

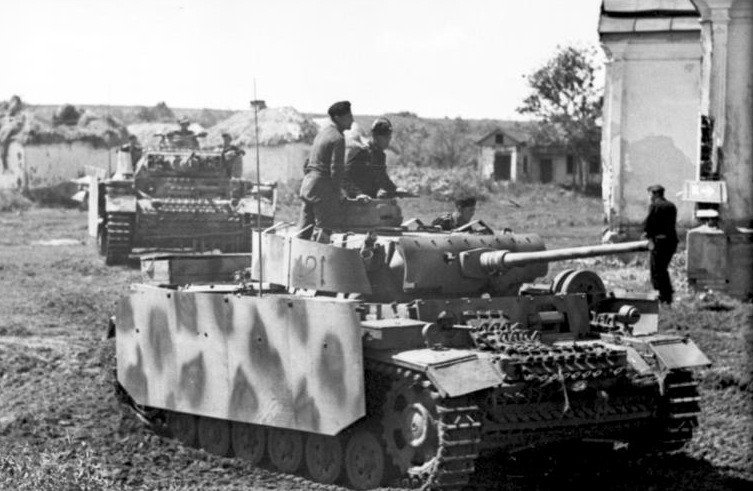
Schürzen spaced armour skirting on PzKpfw III Ausf. M protecting the hull and turret, June 1943

Armour with two or more plates spaced a distance apart falls under the category of spaced armour. Spaced armour can be sloped or unsloped. When sloped, it reduces the penetrating power of bullets and solid shot, as after penetrating each plate projectiles tend to tumble, deflect, deform, or disintegrate; spaced armour that is not sloped is generally designed to provide protection from explosive projectiles, which detonate before reaching the primary armour. Spaced armour is used on military vehicles such as tanks and combat bulldozers. In a less common application, it is used in some spacecraft that use Whipple shields.

== Against kinetic penetrators ==
Tank spaced armour has been fielded since the First World War, when it was fitted to the French Schneider CA1 and Saint-Chamond tanks. The late variants of Panzer III had frontal spaced armour: a 20 mm (0.79 in) thick face-hardened steel layer in front of the 50 mm (2.0 in) thick main armour. Impacting projectiles were physically damaged by the 20 mm plate, so the main armour could withstand much greater hits. Due to lack of materials, German industry eventually switched to Rolled Homogeneous Armour (RHA), which is less effective and due to the slower production process, the technique was not widespread on German tanks.

Many World War II–era German tanks used armoured skirts (Schürzen) to make their thinner side-armour more resistant to anti-tank rifles, contrary to popular belief that the German Schürzen were designed against shaped charge projectiles. The common Russian PTRS rifles could penetrate 35 to 40 mm (1.4 to 1.6 in) of armor at common combat ranges, whereas many German tanks only had 30 mm (1.2 in) of armor on their sides. The skirts thus added 8 mm (0.31 in) of additional thickness to make up the difference, and could theoretically cause the round to tumble, improving protection against those weapons. Nevertheless these rifles continued to be useful throughout the war. A version of the Schürzen which consisted of wire mesh instead of solid plates, Thoma-Schürzen, was introduced for Panzer IV J and Sturmgeschütz IV in September 1944. It was lighter than the original Schürzen and did not block visibility off the vehicle.

Postwar analysis of spaced armour at the US Aberdeen Proving Grounds found spaced armour to be ineffective if the layers are of roughly equal thickness. Numerous trials invariably showed that combinations of multiple plates provided "considerably less protection than a single solid plate of the same total thickness". This is because the midsection of plates provides more resistance to penetration than the front and rear surfaces, and thus having a thicker plate offers better performance. Instead additional layers of armour should be the thinnest required to obtain the possibility of fracturing the projectile, which has the best results in improving protection, though this effect was not consistent and could be mitigated by improved projectile design. Projectiles impacting against sloped spaced armour at greater standoff ranges could also result in the projectile turning to impact the second plate at a more perpendicular angle, making the added armour worse than nothing. This is because a projectile penetrating a plate is deflected towards the normal, an effect that could ruin an armour scheme.

Though spaced armour appeared in some tanks like the Leopard 1 and the Merkava, the armour scheme was not considered to offer sufficiently better protection against armour-piercing projectiles to justify the increased complication they posed, and thus their use on post-war tanks was limited and eventually superseded by more effective composite armour.

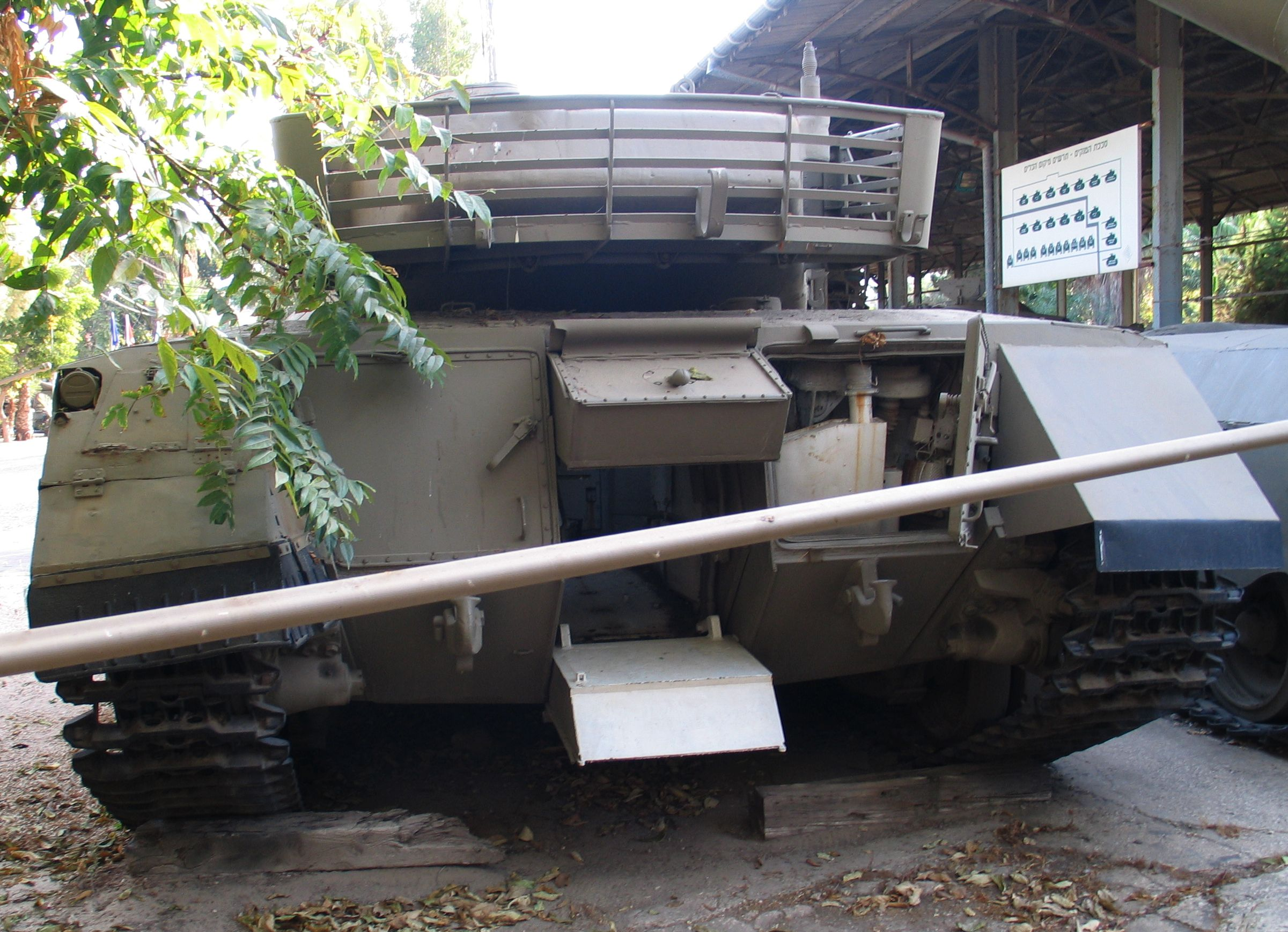
Storage spaces within the spaced armour on a Merkava MBT

== Against high explosive anti-tank rounds ==
Most of the Cold War spaced armour was designed against medium-to-low caliber kinetic munitions, (e.g. 30 mm (1.2 in) autocannon and 76 mm (3.0 in) HESH rounds), especially vehicle side skirts. Most of them were made of RHA plates (Centurion), or thick reinforced rubbers (T-72), and worked in the same way as did WWII-era ones. Some WWII armoured vehicles used nets of wooden logs at a certain distance from the hull as makeshift spaced armour to protect the vehicle from magnetic mines, thrown shaped charges and grenades, and occasionally suicidal methods (e.g. the Japanese lunge mine). This method occurred on US M4 Sherman and Soviet T-34 medium tanks among others.

The idea is that this thin layer of armour detonates explosive warheads prematurely. Such techniques were effective in warships against armour piercing shells with short fuzes. High-explosive anti-tank-type warheads (HEAT) however use a focused hypervelocity jet of copper or steel to penetrate armour. To be effective, HEAT warheads must detonate at a specific distance from the target's primary armour to ensure maximum penetration. Early detonation may reduce the penetration of HEAT ammunition, but it may in fact improve penetration if the round was originally detonating too close to the armour. Due to constraints in the length of projectiles, many designs intentionally detonate closer than the optimum distance, with optimal penetration requiring a standoff distance of over a meter for many early projectiles. Thus conventional skirts are ineffective against HEAT.

To increase effectiveness of skirts against HEAT weapons early T-64s had "gill" skirts. It contained a few short skirts on the side of the vehicle which are opened in open terrain at an angle of between 30–45°, increasing the space between the armour and the plate. It was effective (mass-to-efficiency ratio), but easily detached from the vehicle so it did not spread widely.

Military researchers tried to increase the efficiency of armour by changing the used materials and varying the armour layout, leading to more complex composite armour, which can incorporate empty spaces.

== Spacecraft ==
The Whipple shield uses the principle of spaced armour to protect spacecraft from the impacts of very fast micrometeoroids. The impact with the first wall melts or breaks up the incoming particle, causing fragments to be spread over a wider area when striking the subsequent walls.

== See also ==
- Torpedo bulkheads
- Composite armour
- Slat armour
- Improvised vehicle armour
