= RPG-43 =

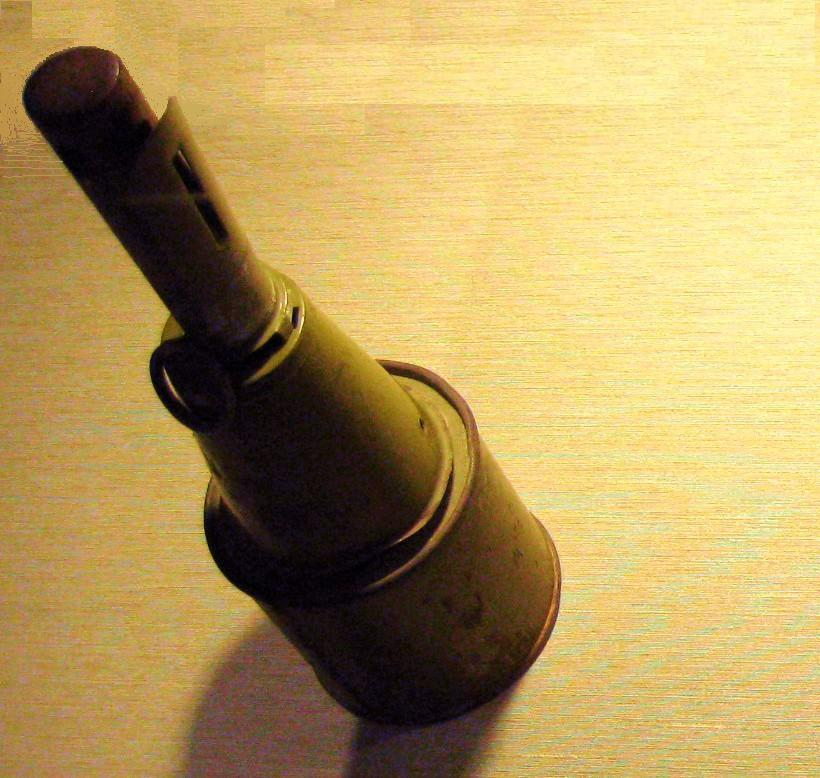
- Type: Anti-tank grenade
- Place of origin: Soviet Union

Service history
- In service: April 1943–1960 (Soviet Union)
- Used by: Soviet Union and Warsaw Pact countries
- Wars: World War II; Korean War; Yom Kippur War; Vietnam War; Lebanese Civil War; Georgian Civil War

Production history
- Designer: N. P. Belyakov
- Designed: 1942–1943

Specifications
- Mass: 1.2 kg (2.6 lb)
- Length: 279 mm (11.0 in)
- Diameter: 102 mm (4.0 in)
- Filling: TNT
- Filling weight: 612 g (21.6 oz)
- Detonation mechanism: Instantaneous impact

The RPG-43 (ruchnaya protivotankovaya granata obraztca 1943 goda, meaning hand-held anti-tank grenade) was a high-explosive anti-tank (HEAT) shaped charge hand grenade used by the Soviet Union during World War II. It entered service in 1943, replacing the RPG-40; the RPG-40 used a simpler high explosive (HE) warhead. The RPG-43 had a penetration of around 75 millimetres (3.0 in) of rolled homogeneous armour at a 90° angle. Later in the war, it was improved and became the RPG-6.

== History ==
Prior to World War II, the Red Army anti-tank weapons included the PTRD-41 and PTRS-41 anti-tank rifles and the RPG-40 hand grenade, which were marginally effective against early German tanks, quickly becoming obsolete when the Germans started fielding heavier tanks to counter the Red Army T-34 and KV tanks. The Soviets also relied on 45 mm anti-tank guns, which started to become obsolete mid-1942.

In response, the Soviets developed the RPG-43 which had enough penetrating power to threaten German Panzer IIIs, Panzer IVs, and StuGs, forcing the Germans to increase armor thickness in their designs and install spaced armour side plates to provide protection against these new grenades. It could also destroy a Panther tank if thrown against the thinly armoured turret roof or engine compartment. While the RPG-43 was succeeded by the RPG-6, both grenades remained in use during WWII against armoured vehicles and fortified positions, such as bunkers.

In the post-war period, the Soviets continued using the RPG-43 and RPG-6 as late as 1960, being replaced by the RKG-3 which offered greater penetration against armour. They also supplied the grenade for several Warsaw Pact allies, including Albania, East Germany, Hungary, and Poland.

Communist forces in the Korean War made use of several stick grenades including the RG-43; During the Vietnam War the North Vietnamese used grenades supplied by the Soviets; The grenade was also used by Egyptian troops during the Yom Kippur War; and paramilitary forces such as the As-Sa'iqa during the Lebanese Civil War; In the 1990s, during the Georgian Civil War several paramilitary groups purchased ex-Soviet surplus grenades from Russian officers.

== Description ==
The RPG-43 is a stick grenade with a 102 millimetres (4.0 in) shaped charge warhead filled with 612 grams (21.6 oz) of TNT. When thrown a conical metal sleeve would open, revealing two strips of cloth to stabilise flight and ensure the head of the grenade would strike its target. It has an effective fragmentation radius of 20 metres (66 ft), and can penetrate 75 millimetres (3.0 in) of armour at a 90° angle.

According to US military manuals, the RPG-43 can be thrown at a distance of approximately 15–20 yards (14–18 m).

The RPG-43 is heavy, making it awkward to use effectively. While it needed to be thrown at very close range, it produced no sound, smoke, or light when used, unlike other anti-tank weapons. Despite its shortcomings, Chinese troops considered the RPG-43 as the best anti-tank weapon at their disposal during the Korean War.

== Users ==
- Albania
- As-Sa'iqa − Used during the Lebanese Civil War
- China
- East Germany
- Egypt − Used during the Yom Kippur War
- Georgia − Used by Georgian military and militia units during 1990s period.
- Hungary
- North Korea
- Poland
- Soviet Union
- Vietnam

== See also ==
- Panzerwurfmine
- List of Russian weaponry

== Bibliography ==
- Bregman, Ahron (1990). Israel's Wars: A History Since 1947. Routledge. ISBN 978-1-134-44608-7.
- Bunker, Robert J. (2010). "Grenades". In Tucker, Spencer C; Pierpaoli Jr, Paul G; Kim, Jinwung; Li, Xiaobing; Matray, James I. (eds.). The Encyclopedia of the Korean War: A Political, Social, and Military History [3 volumes]. Bloomsbury Publishing USA. pp. 292−293. ISBN 978-1-85109-850-7.
- Department of the Army, United States (1952). Handbook on the Chinese Communist Army, September 1952. U.S. Department of the Army.
- Department of the Army, United States (1960). Handbook on the Satellite Armies. Washington, DC: Headquarters, Department of the Army.
- Embassy of Vietnam, United States (20 April 1971). "The Soviet Role in North Viet-Nam's Offensive". Vietnam Bulletin. VII (7). Embassy of Viet-Nam.: 17−23.
- Hogg, Ian V, ed. (1987). Jane's Infantry Weapons, 1987-88 (13th ed.). Jane's Information Group. ISBN 978-0-7106-0843-7.
- McGuire, James D. (May–June 1960). Zierdt Jr., Lt. Col. William H. (ed.). "Sino-Soviet Bloc Antitank Weapons". Armor. LXIX (3). United States Armor Association: 34−40.
- Marine Corps Intelligence Activity, United States (1995). Soviet/Russian Armor and Artillery Design Practices: 1945-1995. Quantico, VA: Marine Corps Intelligence Activity.
- McNab, Chris (2022). US Soldier vs Chinese Soldier: Korea 1951–53. Bloomsbury Publishing. ISBN 978-1-4728-4533-7.
- Rottman, Gordon L. (2013). World War II Infantry Anti-Tank Tactics. Bloomsbury Publishing. ISBN 978-1-4728-0541-6.
- Tucker-Jones, Anthony (2020). Hitler's Panzers: The Complete History 1933–1945. Pen and Sword Military. ISBN 978-1-5267-4161-5.
- Windrow, Martin (2012). Osprey Men-At-Arms: A Celebration. Bloomsbury Publishing. ISBN 978-1-78096-267-2.
