= Type 3 grenade =

Type 3 "anti-tank" grenade
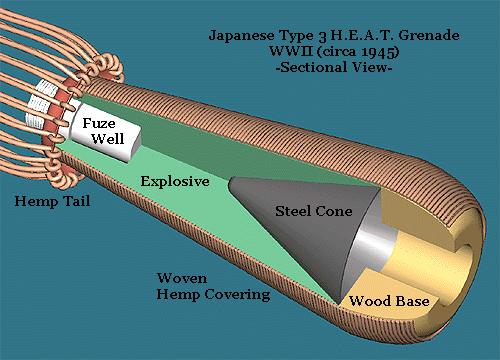
- Type: Anti-tank grenade
- Place of origin: Empire of Japan

Service history
- In service: 1943–1945
- Wars: Second World War

Specifications
- Mass: various
- Length: various
- Diameter: various

The Type 3 "anti-tank" hand grenade (三式対戦車手榴弾) is a Japanese grenade produced from 1943 to 1945 during World War II.

== History ==
Throughout World War II, the U.S bombings gradually degraded the Japanese munition manufacturing base.

Manufacturers were soon forced to find new, inexpensive and creative ways to produce grenades to destroy the Allies' tanks.

Contrary to the Russians or Germans, the heavy armour threat was not very present, thus explaining the late development of the hollow charge.

Examples of this Japanese grenade are extremely hard to find today.

== Design ==
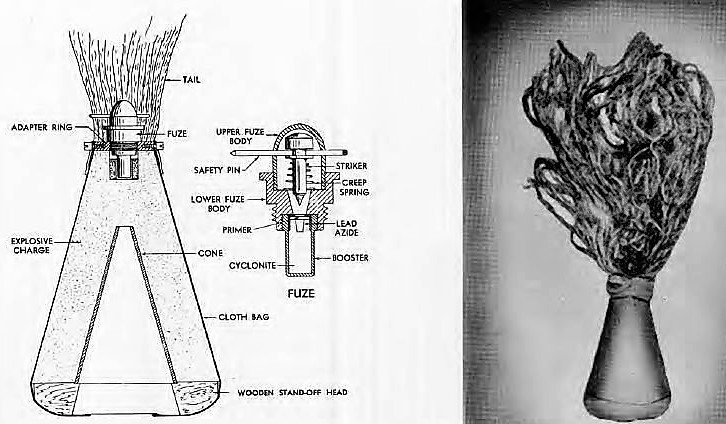
Photograph and diagram of a Type 3 grenade, from a 1945 US Army manual

The Type 3 grenade had a tear drop-like shape. It consisted of a thin steel or aluminium cone mounted on a wooden head.

The Type 3 had a simplistic design and was made from expendable materials. This made the weapon relatively easy to produce.

The purpose of the head was to provide the correct stand-off distance when the weapon detonated, as shaped charges are ineffective if they detonate too close to the target. The explosive was cast around the cone and covered by a cloth bag made of either silk or hemp twine.

The upper extremity was made of a very basic impact firing mechanism, that detonated the grenade if it struck a hard surface at a speed of around 40 feet per second (12 m/s).

A tail made from hemp strands served to stabilize the grenade in flight, and ensured the target was struck successfully. The grenade would be used by first removing the safety pin, then throwing it by hand from a distance of around 10 meters (33 ft).

The grenade had a penetration power of 70 mm (2.8 in). This shows that it exceeds the penetration of the Type 99 magnetic grenade.

== Variants ==
There were three official variants of the Type 3 hand grenade:

=== Ko ===
Known as the Type A, the variant had a length of 17.3 centimetres (6.8 in), a diameter of 11 centimetres (4.3 in) and a weight of 1.27 kilograms (2.8 lb).

The explosive filling was 0.853 kilograms (1.88 lb) of RDX/TNA. The colour of the outer cloth covering was either white or brown-yellow.

=== Otsu ===
Known as the Type B, the variant had a length of 14.8 centimetres (5.8 in), a diameter of 10 centimetres (3.9 in) and a weight of 0.853 kilograms (1.88 lb).

The explosive filling was PETN and TNT with a weight of 0.69 kilograms (1.5 lb). The outer covering was either white or brown-yellow.

=== Hei ===
Known as the Type C, the variant was identical in size and weight to the Otsu Type B, however the explosive filling was Picric acid. The colour was yellow.

== Users ==
- Empire of Japan
  - Imperial Japanese Army
