= Hafthohlladung =

Hafthohlladung 3 kg
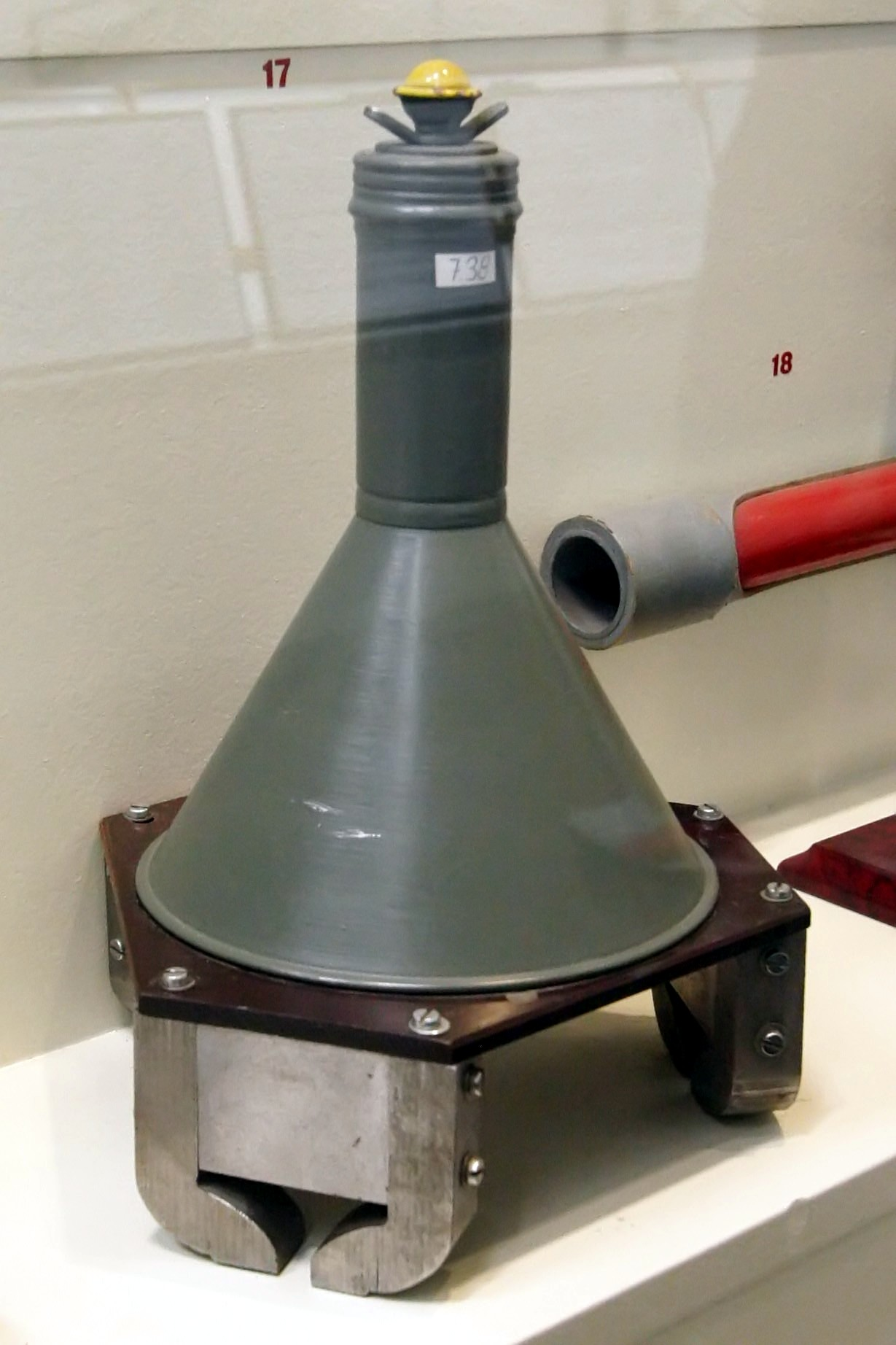
- On display at the German Tank Museum in Münster
- Type: Anti-tank grenade
- Place of origin: Nazi Germany

Service history
- In service: 1942–1945
- Used by: Nazi Germany
- Wars: World War II

Production history
- Produced: 1942–1944
- No. built: 547,000

Specifications (Hafthohlladung 3 kg)
- Mass: 3.5 kg (7.7 lb)
- Diameter: 160 mm (6.3 in)
- Filling: TNT
- Filling weight: 1.5 kg (3.3 lb)
- Detonation mechanism: 4 1/2 or 7-second timer

The Hafthohlladung (German, lit. "adhesive hollow charge"), was a series of magnetically adhered, anti-tank grenades ranging from 2–10 kilograms (4.4–22.0 lb) in (nominal) weight, with the 3 kg (6.6 lb) variant the most commonly used. It was first used by German forces on the Eastern Front and later on the Western Front during World War II, remaining in use until the remaining stockpiles were depleted even after other anti-tank weapons such as the Panzerfaust and Panzerschreck became more readily available.

== Design ==
The Hafthohlladung resembles a metal funnel filled with an high-explosive charge and a pull friction igniter and a pellet of PETN mixed with wax inside the handle which sets off the main charge. According to Ian V. Hogg, the Hafthohlladung 3 kg had a filling of 1.5 kg (3 lb 5 oz) of TNT and a total weight of 3.5 kg (7 lb 11 oz).

Two different igniter sets were used: a blue detonator that set off the charge after a 4 1/2-second delay for hand throwing like a grenade and a yellow painted detonator with 7-second delay to give soldiers enough time to clear out after emplacing the charge. Soldiers were expected to sneak their way to an enemy tank, stick the charge on the hull and then pull the detonator knob and run for cover.

The conical base is attached to a plywood base fitted with three strong horseshoe-shaped magnets and a brass chain with a hook. The latter allowed soldiers to employ the Hafthohlladung as a demolition charge, by hanging it from a nail on a wall, or it could be stood upright on a flat surface. It also could be planted on the ground like a landmine with the magnets facing up: when an enemy tank passed over the Hafthohlladung, the magnetic attraction would make it jump off the ground and attach itself to the steel belly of the tank and simultaneously activate the fuze.

The shaped charge could penetrate about 130 mm (5.1 in) of armor, while the penetrating fire jet sprayed the interior of the tank with incandescent metal spall, damaging equipment and burning the combustible materials inside. It was also effective against fortifications, being capable of penetrating 510 mm (20 in) of reinforced concrete.

== History ==
During the early stages of Operation Barbarossa, the Germans reached the conclusion that their anti-tank rifles and guns were largely ineffective against the Soviet T-34 and KV tanks, leading to the development of shaped charge weapons; the Hafthohlladung was one of the most effective anti-tank munitions developed, capable of defeating any contemporary Soviet tank though it required soldiers to get close enough to stick the mines on the enemy vehicles.

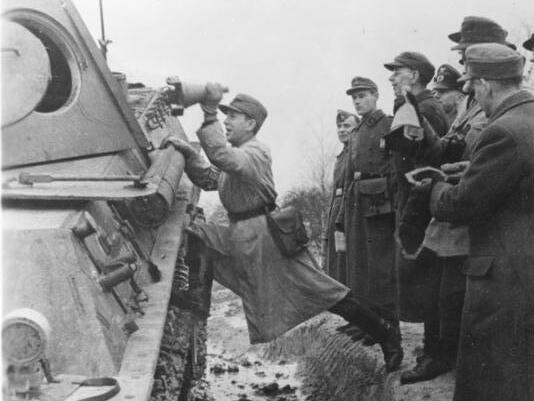
A Volkssturm unit training with Hafthohlladungen on a Panther tank

In order to encourage soldiers to use it, on 9 March, 1942 the Army High Command established the Special Award for Close Combat against Tank by Individual Fighters (German: Sonderabzeichen für das Niederkämpfen von Panzerkampfwagen durch Einzelkämpfer) for soldiers who managed to destroy enemy tanks with close-range weapons. On 18 December 1943, a gold badge was introduced for soldiers who managed to destroy five enemy tanks; according to Zaloga, about 10,000 gold badges were awarded through 1944, with the majority of these instances involving the use of the Hafthohlladung, though no exact statistics were kept. It was also later used against British and American tanks in the Normandy campaign, but by that time the supply of grenades was running low and it was largely replaced by other anti-tank weapons, such as the Panzerfaust and Panzerschreck.

Introduced in May 1942, about 8,200 Hafthohlladungen were produced that year, with production ramping up to 385,400 in 1943. Production ended in October 1944, with about 547,000 manufactured in total. The Hafthohlladung was successful enough to lead the Germans into—erroneously presuming that the Soviets would create their own copy—developing the Zimmerit anti-magnetic paste for their armored fighting vehicles.

== See also ==
- Limpet mine, the anti-ship nautical "precursor" to the Hafthohlladung ordnance
- Zimmerit, plaster-like coating system applied on German combat vehicles to defeat any similar Allied magnetically adhered anti-tank ordnance
