= Panzerwurfmine =

Hand-thrown anti-tank grenade

Drawings of a Panzerwurfmine

The Panzerwurfmine (abbreviated to PWM) was a shaped charge hand-thrown anti-tank grenade used by Luftwaffe ground troops in World War II.

== Appearance ==
The Panzerwurfmine's appearance owed much to the Panzerfaust (specifically its warhead), which was of similar construction and operation. The major difference was that the PWM had a tube attached to the charge, running behind it, with some form of stabilising fins or canvas attached to the rear of the tube.

== Premise ==
For any high-explosive anti-tank mine or grenade to be effective against armour, it must hit squarely on to the armour so that the high-velocity jet of metal punches through at a ninety degree angle. A way of making sure this happens is to place the charge onto the armour by hand. However, this puts the participant into grave danger from defensive fire from the tank and other enemies. A thrown version would be more versatile, but it would be hard to ensure the ninety degree angle.

The Panzerwurfmine is designed to achieve the stable flight needed by the deployment of large fins or canvas lengths at the back of the design, to stabilise the trajectory of the grenade and therefore make a ninety degree angle contact more likely. When the PWM hits the armour, the shaped charge is activated. However, in combat use the Panzerwurfmine often did not live up to expectations, due to the relatively short range it could be thrown, and also the relative lack of clean ninety degree impacts, decreasing its effectiveness.

== Versions ==
The first version of the Panzerwurfmine was the Panzerwurfmine Lang ("long"). This weighed 1.36kg, and had a total length of 53.3 cm. It was stabilised by fins at the rear of the tube, that sprang out when the device was thrown. It was first introduced in May 1943, with 203,800 produced in that year. It was discontinued in favour of the Panzerwurfmine Kurz ("short"), which was stabilised by a canvas strip that rolled out when the device was thrown, and was also shorter.

Both designs had warheads with a diameter of 11.4cm, carrying a shaped charge of 500g that could penetrate approximately 150mm of RHA at zero degrees.

== See also ==
- Panzerfaust, Nazi Germany's primary anti-tank grenade launcher system
- RPG-43 and RPG-6, the Russian equivalents
