= RPG-6 =

RPG-6 (РПГ-6)
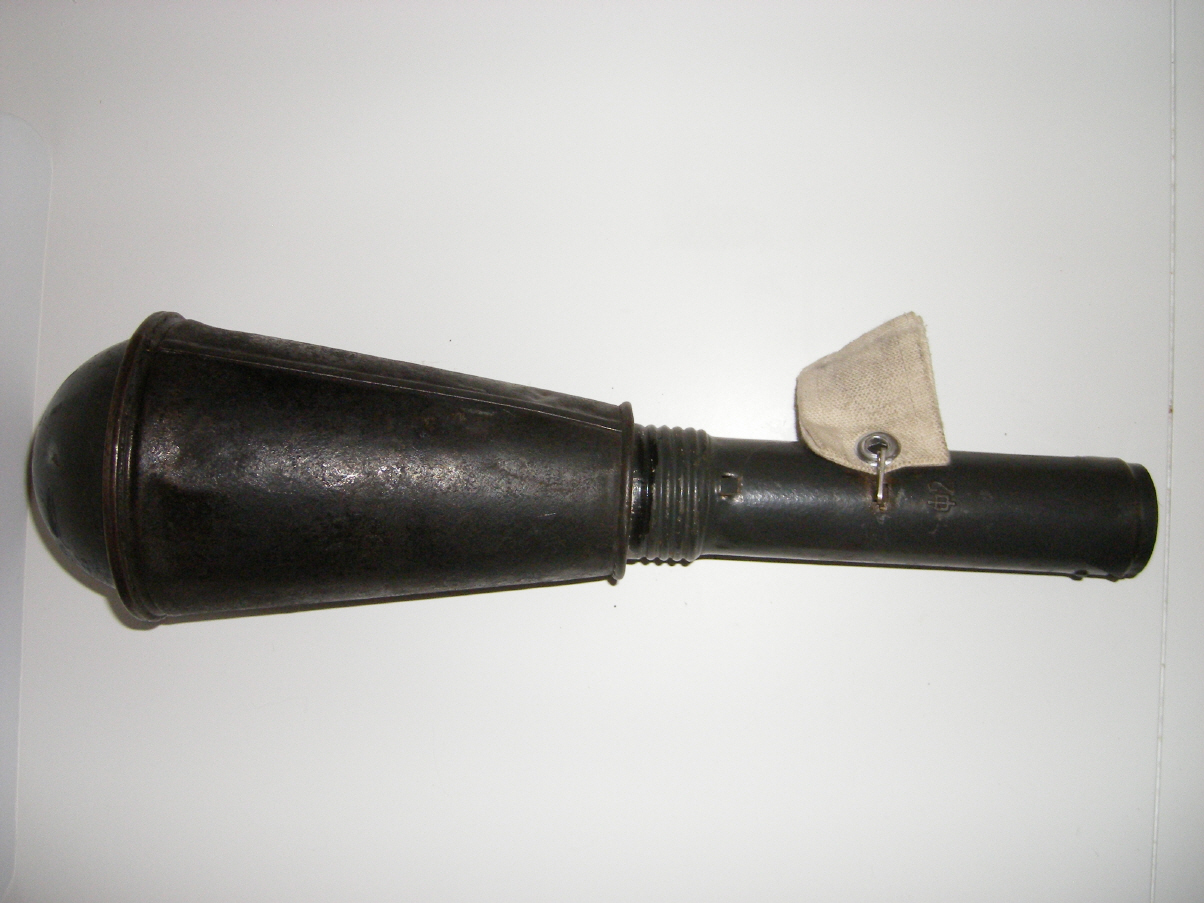
- Type: Anti-tank grenade
- Place of origin: Soviet Union

Service history
- In service: October 1943 –
- Used by: Soviet Union and Warsaw Pact countries
- Wars: World War II

Production history
- Designer: M. Z. Polevikov; L. B. Ioffe; N. S. Zhitkikh
- Designed: 1943

Specifications
- Mass: 1.13 kg
- Length: 337 mm
- Diameter: 103 mm
- Filling: TNT shaped charge
- Filling weight: 0.6 kg
- Detonation mechanism: Impact fuze

The RPG-6 (Russian Ruchnaya Protivotankovaya Granata, "Handheld Anti-Tank Grenade") was a Soviet-era anti-tank hand grenade used during the late World War II and early Cold War period. It was superseded by the RKG-3 anti-tank grenade.

== History ==
The RPG-6 was designed as a replacement for the RPG-43 after the Battle of Kursk.

It underwent testing in September 1943, and was accepted into service in October 1943. First RPG-6 grenades were used against Axis troops in last week of October 1943.

The weapon was a success and went into mass production in late 1943. During the war, RPG-6 grenades being used alongside the RPG-43.

In the USSR, some grenades were kept in storage even after the end of the World War II.

== Design ==
It operated on the shaped charge Munroe effect principle, in which a metal-lined cone-shaped explosive charge would generate a very high speed, focused jet of metal that could penetrate armor-plate.

It was a conical casing enclosing a shaped charge and containing 562 grams of trinitrotoluene (TNT), fitted with a percussion fuse and four cloth ribbons to provide stability in flight after throwing. It could penetrate approximately 100 millimeters of armour. The RPG-6 had a fragmentation radius of 20 metres from the point of detonation, and proved useful against infantry and tanks.

The RPG-43 had a large warhead, but was designed to detonate in contact with a tank's armour; it was later found that optimal performance was gained from a high-explosive anti-tank (HEAT) warhead if it exploded a short distance from the armour, roughly the same distance as the weapon's diameter. In the RPG-6 this was achieved by adding a hollow pointed nose section with an impact fuse in it, so that when the weapon detonated the warhead was at an optimum distance from the armour.
