= Shaped charge =

Explosive with focused effect

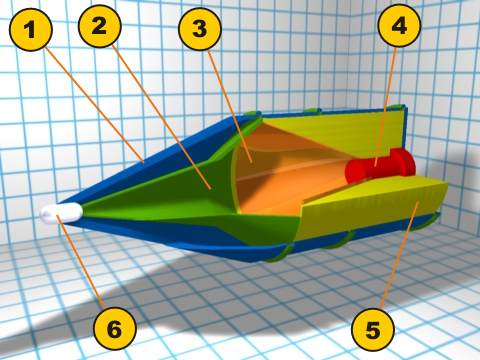
Cross-section diagram of a hollow charge projectile. 1: Ballistic cap; 2: Air-filled cavity; 3: Conical liner; 4: Detonator; 5: High explosive; 6: Piezo-electric fuze.

A shaped charge, commonly also hollow charge if shaped with a cavity, is an explosive charge shaped to focus the effect of the explosive's energy. Different types of shaped charges are used for various purposes such as cutting and forming metal, initiating nuclear weapons, penetrating armor, or perforating wells in the oil and gas industry.

The effectiveness of a shaped charge is significantly influenced by manufacturing technology. From the military and civilian use of shaped charges, it is known that a typical modern shaped charge, having a conical cavity equipped with a metal liner, and produced using conventional technologies and traditional lining materials, can penetrate a hardened steel barrier to a depth of no more than 6 charge diameters (CD). However, by increasing the precision of shaped charge manufacturing, meeting all quality requirements for the lining material and the explosive charge, using advanced methods of filling with high-explosives, and using initiation systems capable of precisely controlling the detonation front, it is possible to increase this limit to 8–10 charge diameters. Finally, for perfectly manufactured shaped charges, it is expected that penetration depths of steel barriers equal to 12 calibers or charge diameters can be achieved.

Contrary to misconception, possibly resulting from the acronym HEAT (high-explosive anti-tank), the shaped charge does not depend in any way on heating or melting for its effectiveness; that is, the jet from a shaped charge does not melt its way through armor, as its effect is purely kinetic in nature. However, the process does create significant heat and often has a significant secondary incendiary effect after penetration.

== Function ==
Operation of a shaped charge (2D animation).

The shock wave from an explosive is perpendicular to the surface of the explosive. The inside of a cone focuses and concentrates the shock wave to points along the axis of the cone. As the explosion progresses from the point of detonation, the concentrated shock wave progresses along the axis of the cone, gathering energy along the way.

The addition of a liner increases the effect of the explosion by providing a heavy mass that is ejected as a high velocity jet from the cone.

== Munroe effect ==
The Munroe or Neumann effect is the focusing of blast energy by a hollow or void cut on a surface of an explosive. The earliest mention of hollow charges was in 1792. Franz Xaver von Baader (1765–1841) was a German mining engineer at that time; in a mining journal, he advocated a conical space at the forward end of a blasting charge to increase the explosive's effect and thereby save powder. About 1805, the idea was adopted, for a time, in Norway and in the mines of the Harz mountains of Germany, although the only available explosive at the time was gunpowder, which is not a high explosive and hence incapable of producing the shock wave that the shaped-charge effect requires.

The first true hollow charge effect was achieved in 1883, by Max von Foerster (1845–1905), chief of the nitrocellulose factory of Wolff & Co. in Walsrode, Germany.

By 1886, Gustav Bloem of Düsseldorf, Germany, had filed U.S. patent 342,423 for hemispherical cavity metal detonators to concentrate the effect of the explosion in an axial direction.

The Munroe effect is named after Charles E. Munroe, who discovered it in 1888. As a civilian chemist working at the U.S. Naval Torpedo Station at Newport, Rhode Island, he noticed that when a block of explosive guncotton with the manufacturer's name stamped into it was detonated next to a metal plate, the lettering was cut into the plate. Conversely, if letters were raised in relief above the surface of the explosive, then the letters on the plate would also be raised above its surface. In 1894, Munroe constructed his first crude shaped charge:

Among the experiments made [...] was one upon a safe twenty-nine inches cube, with walls four inches and three quarters thick, made up of plates of iron and steel [...] When a hollow charge of dynamite nine pounds and a half in weight and untamped was detonated on it, a hole three inches in diameter was blown clear through the wall [...] The hollow cartridge was made by tying the sticks of dynamite around a tin can, the open mouth of the latter being placed downward.

— Charles E. Munroe, The applications of explosives

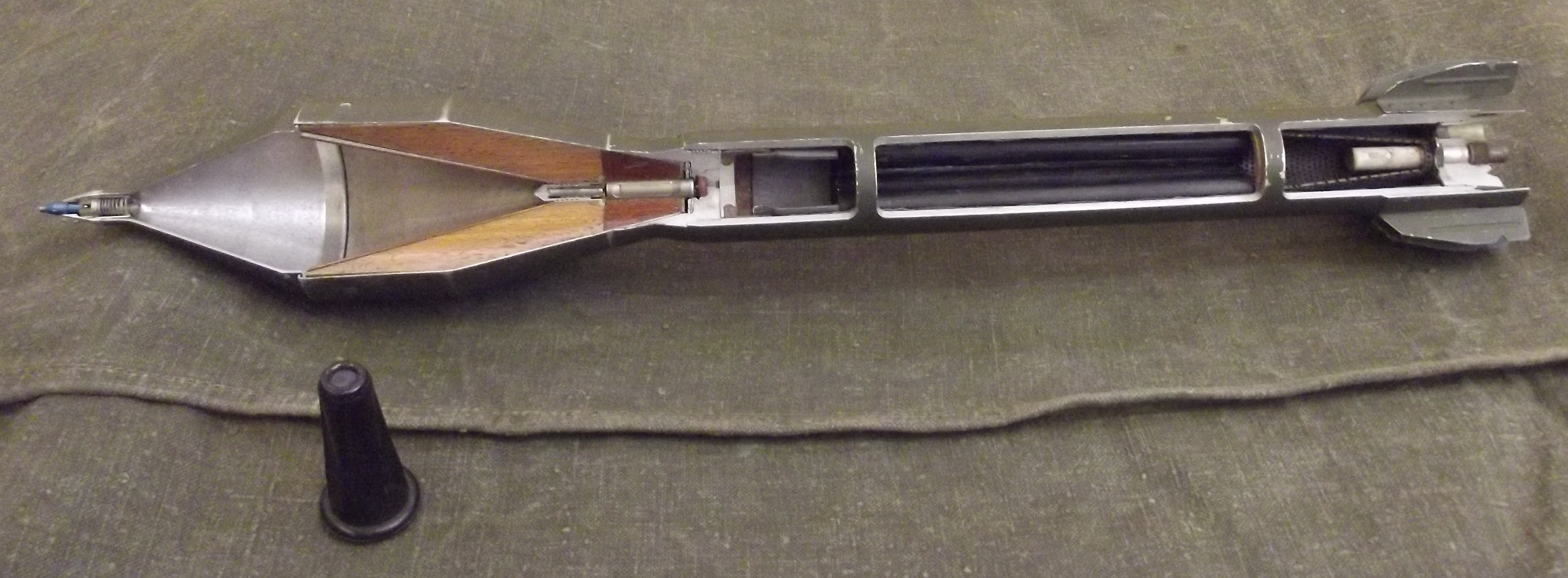
Sectioned RL-83 Blindicide rocket.

Although Munroe's experiment with the shaped charge was widely publicized in 1900 in Popular Science Monthly, the importance of the tin can "liner" of the hollow charge remained unrecognized for another 44 years. Part of that 1900 article was reprinted in the February 1945 issue of Popular Science, describing how shaped-charge warheads worked. It was this article that at last revealed to the general public how the United States Army bazooka actually worked against armored vehicles during WWII.

In 1910, Egon Neumann of Germany discovered that a block of TNT, which would normally dent a steel plate, punched a hole through it if the explosive had a conical indentation. The military usefulness of Munroe's and Neumann's work was unappreciated for a long time. Between the world wars, academics in several countries – Myron Yakovlevich Sukharevskii (Мирон Яковлевич Сухаревский) in the Soviet Union, William H. Payman and Donald Whitley Woodhead in Britain, and Robert Williams Wood in the U.S. – recognized that projectiles could form during explosions.

In 1932 Franz Rudolf Thomanek, a student of physics at Vienna's Technische Hochschule, conceived an anti-tank round that was based on the hollow charge effect. When the Austrian government showed no interest in pursuing the idea, Thomanek moved to Berlin's Technische Hochschule, where he continued his studies under the ballistics expert Carl Julius Cranz. There in 1935, he and Hellmuth von Huttern developed a prototype anti-tank round. Although the weapon's performance proved disappointing, Thomanek continued his developmental work, collaborating with Hubert Schardin at the Waffeninstitut der Luftwaffe (Air Force Weapons Institute) in Braunschweig.

By 1937, Schardin believed that hollow-charge effects were due to the interactions of shock waves. It was during the testing of this idea that, on February 4, 1938, Thomanek conceived the shaped-charge explosive (or Hohlladungs-Auskleidungseffekt (hollow-charge liner effect)). (It was Gustav Adolf Thomer who in 1938 first visualized, by flash radiography, the metallic jet produced by a shaped-charge explosion.) Meanwhile, Henry Hans Mohaupt, a chemical engineer in Switzerland, had independently developed a shaped-charge munition in 1935, which was demonstrated to the Swiss, French, British, and U.S. militaries.

During World War II, shaped-charge munitions were developed by Germany (Panzerschreck, Panzerfaust, Panzerwurfmine, Mistel), Britain (No. 68 AT grenade, PIAT, Beehive cratering charge), the Soviet Union (RPG-43, RPG-6), the U.S. (M9 rifle grenade, bazooka), Italy (Effetto Pronto Speciale shells for various artillery pieces) and Japan (Type 3 grenade, Lunge mine). The development of shaped charges revolutionized anti-tank warfare. Tanks faced a serious vulnerability from a weapon that could be carried by an infantryman or aircraft.

One of the earliest uses of shaped charges was by German glider-borne troops against the Belgian Fort Eben-Emael in 1940. These demolition charges – developed by Dr. Wuelfken of the German Ordnance Office – were unlined explosive charges and did not produce a metal jet like the modern HEAT warheads. Due to the lack of metal liner they shook the turrets but they did not destroy them, and other airborne troops were forced to climb on the turrets and smash the gun barrels.

== Applications ==
=== Modern military ===
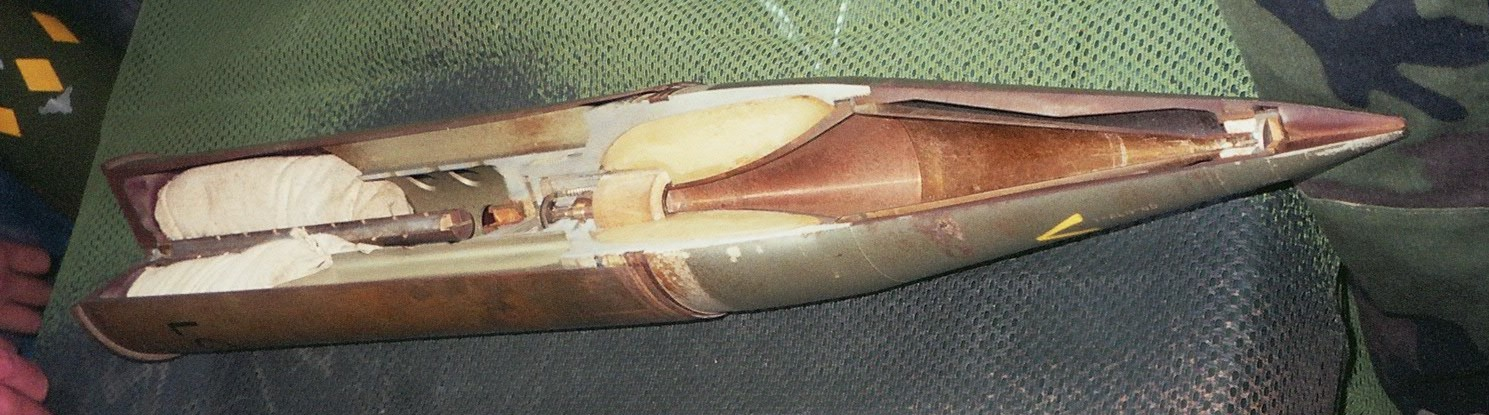
Sectioned high-explosive anti-tank round with the inner shaped charge visible.

The common term in military terminology for shaped-charge warheads is high-explosive anti-tank (HEAT) warhead. HEAT warheads are frequently used in anti-tank guided missiles, unguided rockets, gun-fired projectiles (both spun (spin stabilized) and unspun), rifle grenades, land mines, bomblets, torpedoes, and various other weapons.

==== Protection ====
During World War II, the precision of the charge's construction and its detonation mode were both inferior to modern warheads. This lower precision caused the jet to curve and to break up at an earlier time and hence at a shorter distance. The resulting dispersion decreased the penetration depth for a given cone diameter and also shortened the optimum standoff distance. Since the charges were less effective at larger standoffs, side and turret skirts (known as Schürzen) fitted to some German tanks to protect against ordinary anti-tank rifles were found to give the jet room to disperse and hence also reduce HEAT penetration.

The use of add-on spaced armor skirts on armored vehicles may have the opposite effect and increase the penetration of shaped-charge warheads in some cases. Due to constraints in the length of the projectile/missile, the built-in stand-off on many warheads is less than the optimum distance. In such cases, the skirting effectively increases the distance between the armor and the target, and the warhead detonates closer to its optimum standoff. Skirting should not be confused with cage armor which is primarily used to damage the fusing system of RPG-7 projectiles, but can also cause a HEAT projectile to pitch up or down on impact, lengthening the penetration path for the shaped charge's penetration stream. If the nose probe strikes one of the cage armor slats, the warhead will function as normal.

=== Non-military ===
In non-military applications shaped charges are used in explosive demolition of buildings and structures, in particular for cutting through metal piles, columns and beams and for boring holes. In steelmaking, small shaped charges are often used to pierce taps that have become plugged with slag. They are also used in quarrying, breaking up ice, breaking log jams, felling trees, and drilling post holes.

Shaped charges are used most extensively in the petroleum and natural gas industries, in particular in the completion of oil and gas wells, in which they are detonated to perforate the metal casing of the well at intervals to admit the influx of oil and gas. Another use in the industry is to put out oil and gas fires by depriving the fire of oxygen.

A 4.5 kg (9.9 lb) shaped charge was used on the Hayabusa2 mission on asteroid 162173 Ryugu. The spacecraft dropped the explosive device onto the asteroid and detonated it with the spacecraft behind cover. The detonation dug a crater about 10 meters wide, to provide access to a pristine sample of the asteroid.

== Technical characteristics ==
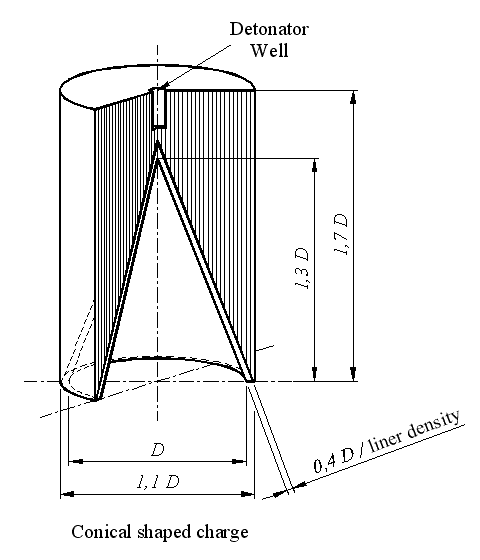
Cross-section diagram of a typical shaped (hollow) charge. The conical cavity with its metal liner is visible at the lower end, the small central well housing the detonator is visible at the upper end.

A typical device consists of a solid cylinder of explosive with a metal-lined conical hollow in one end and a central detonator, array of detonators, or detonation wave guide at the other end. Explosive energy is released directly away from (normal to) the surface of an explosive, so shaping the explosive will concentrate the explosive energy in the void. If the hollow is properly shaped, usually conically, the enormous pressure generated by the detonation of the explosive drives the liner in the hollow cavity inward to collapse upon its central axis.

The resulting collision forms and projects a high-velocity jet of metal particles forward along the axis. Most of the jet material originates from the innermost part of the liner, a layer of about 10% to 20% of the thickness. The rest of the liner forms a slower-moving slug of material, which, because of its appearance, is sometimes called a "carrot".

Because of the variation along the liner in its collapse velocity, the jet's velocity also varies along its length, decreasing from the front. This variation in jet velocity stretches it and eventually leads to its break-up into particles. Over time, the particles tend to fall out of alignment, which reduces the depth of penetration at long standoffs.

At the apex of the cone, which forms the very front of the jet, the liner does not have time to be fully accelerated before it forms its part of the jet. This results in a small part of the jet being projected at a lower velocity than the jet formed later behind it. As a result, the initial parts of the jet coalesce to form a pronounced wider tip portion.

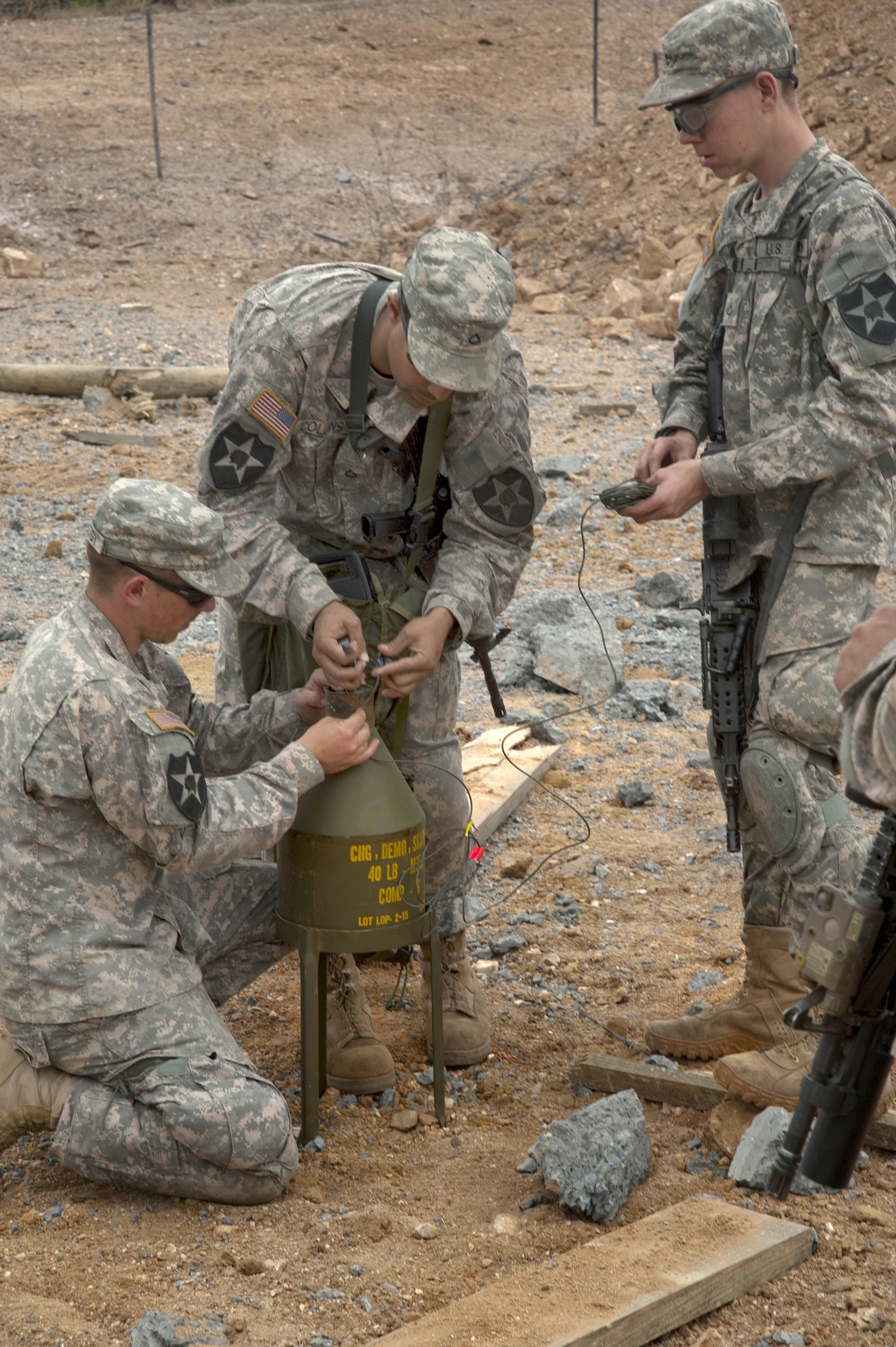
A 40 lb (18 kg) Composition B shaped charge used by combat engineers, for the purpose of boring a hole for a cratering charge. The lower supports serve to keep the shaped charge at the optimal standoff distance from the target (usually equal to one and one-half cone diameters).

Most of the jet travels at hypersonic speed. The tip moves at 7 to 14 km/s, the jet tail at a lower velocity (1 to 3 km/s), and the slug at a still lower velocity (less than 1 km/s). The exact velocities depend on the charge's configuration and confinement, explosive type, materials used, and the explosive-initiation mode. At typical velocities, the penetration process generates such enormous pressures that it may be considered hydrodynamic; to a good approximation, the jet and armor may be treated as inviscid, compressible fluids (see, for example,), with their material strengths ignored.

A recent technique using magnetic diffusion analysis showed that the temperature of the outer 50% by volume of a copper jet tip while in flight was between 1100K and 1200K, much closer to the melting point of copper (1358 K) than previously assumed. This temperature is consistent with a hydrodynamic calculation that simulated the entire experiment. In comparison, two-color radiometry measurements from the late 1970s indicate lower temperatures for various shaped-charge liner material, cone construction and type of explosive filler.

A Comp-B loaded shaped charge with a copper liner and pointed cone apex had a jet tip temperature ranging from 668 K to 863 K over a five shot sampling. Octol-loaded charges with a rounded cone apex generally had higher surface temperatures with an average of 810 K, and the temperature of a tin-lead liner with Comp-B fill averaged 842 K. While the tin-lead jet was determined to be liquid, the copper jets are well below the melting point of copper. However, these temperatures are not completely consistent with evidence that soft recovered copper jet particles show signs of melting at the core while the outer portion remains solid and cannot be equated with bulk temperature.

The location of the charge relative to its target is critical for optimum penetration for two reasons. If the charge is detonated too close there is not enough time for the jet to fully develop. But the jet disintegrates and disperses after a relatively short distance, usually well under two meters. At such standoffs, it breaks into particles which tend to tumble and drift off the axis of penetration, so that the successive particles tend to widen rather than deepen the hole. At very long standoffs, velocity is lost to air drag, further degrading penetration. Usually, the normal standoff distance is one and one-half cone diameters.

Another key factor to the effectiveness of the hollow charge is its diameter. As the penetration continues through the target, the width of the hole decreases leading to a characteristic "fist to finger" action, where the size of the eventual "finger" is based on the size of the original "fist". In general, shaped charges can penetrate a steel plate as thick as 150% to 700% of their diameter, depending on the charge quality. The figure is for basic steel plate, not for the composite armor, reactive armor, or other types of modern armor.

=== Liner ===
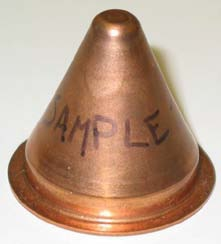
Example of a copper cone used as a shaped charge's liner.

The most common shape of the liner is conical, with an internal apex angle of 30 to 90 degrees. Different apex angles yield different distributions of jet mass and velocity. Small apex angles can result in jet bifurcation, or even in the failure of the jet to form at all; this is attributed to the collapse velocity being above a certain threshold, normally slightly higher than the liner material's bulk sound speed. Other widely used shapes include hemispheres, tulips, trumpets, ellipses, and bi-conics; the various shapes yield jets with different velocity and mass distributions.

Liners have been made from many materials, including various metals and glass. The deepest penetrations are achieved with a dense, ductile metal, but of course those are not the only qualifiers, or lead would be more popular than it is for this purpose - instead, a very common choice has been copper. For some modern anti-armor weapons, molybdenum and pseudo-alloys of tungsten filler and copper binder (9:1, thus density is ≈18 Mg/m^{3}) have been adopted. Nearly every common metallic element has been tried, including aluminum, tungsten, tantalum, depleted uranium, lead, tin, cadmium, cobalt, magnesium, titanium, zinc, zirconium, molybdenum, beryllium, nickel, silver, and even gold and platinum. The selection of the material depends on the target to be penetrated; for example, aluminum has been found to be advantageous for concrete targets.

In early antitank weapons, copper was used as a liner material. Later, in the 1970s, it was found that tantalum is superior to copper, due to its much higher density and very high ductility at high strain rates. Other high-density high-ductility metals and alloys tend to have drawbacks in terms of price (both gold and platinum have greater density and ductility than tantalum, but are cost prohibitive), toxicity (thallium is about 71% tantalum's density and about 45% more ductile, but it is extremely toxic), or radioactivity.

For the deepest penetrations, pure metals yield the best results, because they display the greatest ductility, which delays the breakup of the jet into particles as it stretches. In charges for oil well completion, however, it is essential that a solid slug or "carrot" not be formed, since it would plug the hole just penetrated and interfere with the influx of oil. In the petroleum industry, therefore, liners are generally fabricated by powder metallurgy, often of pseudo-alloys which, if unsintered, yield jets that are composed mainly of dispersed fine metal particles.

Unsintered cold pressed liners, however, are not waterproof and tend to be brittle, which makes them easy to damage during handling. Bimetallic liners, usually zinc-lined copper, can be used; during jet formation the zinc layer vaporizes and a slug is not formed; the disadvantage is an increased cost and dependency of jet formation on the quality of bonding the two layers. Low-melting-point (below 500 °C) solder- or braze-like alloys (e.g., Sn_{50}Pb_{50}, Zn_{97.6}Pb_{1.6}, or pure metals like lead, zinc, or cadmium) can be used; these melt before reaching the well casing, and the molten metal does not obstruct the hole. Other alloys, binary eutectics (e.g. Pb_{88.8}Sb_{11.1}, Sn_{61.9}Pd_{38.1}, or Ag_{71.9}Cu_{28.1}), form a metal-matrix composite material with ductile matrix with brittle dendrites; such materials reduce slug formation but are difficult to shape.

A metal-matrix composite with discrete inclusions of low-melting material is another option; the inclusions either melt before the jet reaches the well casing, weakening the material, or serve as crack nucleation sites, and the slug breaks up on impact. The dispersion of the second phase can be achieved also with castable alloys (e.g., copper) with a low-melting-point metal insoluble in copper, such as bismuth, 1–5% lithium, or up to 50% (usually 15–30%) lead; the size of inclusions can be adjusted by thermal treatment. Non-homogeneous distribution of the inclusions can also be achieved. Other additives can modify the alloy properties; tin (4–8%), nickel (up to 30% and often together with tin), up to 8% aluminium, phosphorus (forming brittle phosphides) or 1–5% silicon form brittle inclusions serving as crack initiation sites. Up to 30% zinc can be added to lower the material cost and to form additional brittle phases.

Oxide glass liners produce jets of low density, therefore yielding less penetration depth. Double-layer liners, with one layer of a less dense but pyrophoric metal (e.g. aluminum or magnesium), can be used to enhance incendiary effects following the armor-piercing action; explosive welding can be used for making those, as then the metal-metal interface is homogeneous, does not contain significant amount of intermetallics, and does not have adverse effects to the formation of the jet.

The penetration depth is proportional to the maximum length of the jet, which is a product of the jet tip velocity and time to particulation. The jet tip velocity depends on bulk sound velocity in the liner material, the time to particulation is dependent on the ductility of the material. The maximum achievable jet velocity is roughly 2.34 times the sound velocity in the material. The speed can reach 10 km/s, peaking some 40 microseconds after detonation; the cone tip is subjected to acceleration of about 25 million g. The jet tail reaches about 2–5 km/s. The pressure between the jet tip and the target can reach one terapascal. The immense pressure makes the metal flow like a liquid, though x-ray diffraction has shown the metal stays solid; one of the theories explaining this behavior proposes molten core and solid sheath of the jet. The best materials are face-centered cubic metals, as they are the most ductile, but even graphite and zero-ductility ceramic cones show significant penetration.

=== Explosive charge ===
For optimal penetration, a high explosive with a high detonation velocity and pressure is normally chosen. The most common explosive used in high performance anti-armor warheads is HMX (octogen), although never in its pure form, as it would be too sensitive. It is normally compounded with a few percent of some type of plastic binder, such as in the polymer-bonded explosive (PBX) LX-14, or with another less-sensitive explosive, such as TNT, with which it forms Octol. Other common high-performance explosives are RDX-based compositions, again either as PBXs or mixtures with TNT (to form Composition B and the Cyclotols) or wax (Cyclonites). Some explosives incorporate powdered aluminum to increase their blast and detonation temperature, but this addition generally results in decreased performance of the shaped charge. There has been research into using the very high-performance but sensitive explosive CL-20 in shaped-charge warheads, but, at present, due to its sensitivity, this has been in the form of the PBX composite LX-19 (CL-20 and Estane binder).

=== Other features ===
A 'waveshaper' is a body (typically a disc or cylindrical block) of an inert material (typically solid or foamed plastic, but sometimes metal, perhaps hollow) inserted within the explosive for the purpose of changing the path of the detonation wave. The effect is to modify the collapse of the cone and resulting jet formation, with the intent of increasing penetration performance. Waveshapers are often used to save space; a shorter charge with a waveshaper can achieve the same performance as a longer charge without a waveshaper. Given that the space of possible waveshapes is infinite, machine learning methods have been developed to engineer more optimal waveshapers that can enhance the performance of a shaped charge via computational design.

Another useful design feature is sub-calibration, the use of a liner having a smaller diameter (caliber) than the explosive charge. In an ordinary charge, the explosive near the base of the cone is so thin that it is unable to accelerate the adjacent liner to sufficient velocity to form an effective jet. In a sub-calibrated charge, this part of the device is effectively cut off, resulting in a shorter charge with the same performance.

== Variants ==
There are several forms of shaped charge.

=== Linear shaped charges ===
Diagram of a linear shaped charge. Red: detonator; blue: casing; yellow: high explosive; orange: lined "V" profile.

A linear shaped charge (LSC) has a lining with V-shaped profile and varying length. The lining is surrounded with explosive, the explosive then encased within a suitable material that serves to protect the explosive and to confine (tamp) it on detonation. "At detonation, the focusing of the explosive high pressure wave as it becomes incident to the side wall causes the metal liner of the LSC to collapse–creating the cutting force." The detonation projects into the lining, to form a continuous, knife-like (planar) jet. The jet cuts any material in its path, to a depth depending on the size and materials used in the charge. Generally, the jet penetrates around 1 to 1.2 times the charge width. For the cutting of complex geometries, there are also flexible versions of the linear shaped charge, these with a lead or high-density foam sheathing and a ductile/flexible lining material, which also is often lead. LSCs are commonly used in the cutting of rolled steel joists (RSJ) and other structural targets, such as in the controlled demolition of buildings. LSCs are also used to separate the stages of multistage rockets, and destroy them when they go errant.

=== Explosively formed penetrator ===
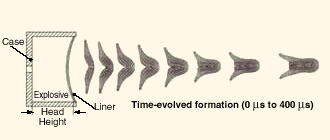
Aerodynamic development of the metal plate of an explosively formed penetrator (EFP) munition, a few microseconds after the detonation of the explosive charge.

The explosively formed penetrator (EFP) is also known as the self-forging fragment (SFF), explosively formed projectile (EFP), self-forging projectile (SEFOP), plate charge, and Misnay-Schardin (MS) charge. An EFP uses the action of the explosive's detonation wave (and to a lesser extent the propulsive effect of its detonation products) to project and deform a plate or dish of ductile metal (such as copper, iron, or tantalum) into a compact high-velocity projectile, commonly called the slug. This slug is projected toward the target at about two kilometers per second. The chief advantage of the EFP over a conventional (e.g., conical) shaped charge is its effectiveness at very great standoffs, equal to hundreds of times the charge's diameter (perhaps a hundred meters for a practical device).

The EFP is relatively unaffected by first-generation reactive armor and can travel up to perhaps 1000 charge diameters (CD)s before its velocity becomes ineffective at penetrating armor due to aerodynamic drag, or successfully hitting the target becomes a problem. The impact of a ball or slug EFP normally causes a large-diameter but relatively shallow hole, of, at most, a couple of CDs. If the EFP perforates the armor, spalling and extensive behind armor effects (BAE, also called behind armor damage, BAD) will occur.

The BAE is mainly caused by the high-temperature and high-velocity armor and slug fragments being injected into the interior space and the blast overpressure caused by this debris. More modern EFP warhead versions, through the use of advanced initiation modes, can also produce long-rods (stretched slugs), multi-slugs and finned rod/slug projectiles. The long-rods are able to penetrate a much greater depth of armor, at some loss to BAE, multi-slugs are better at defeating light or area targets and the finned projectiles are much more accurate.

The use of this warhead type is mainly restricted to lightly armored areas of main battle tanks (MBT) such as the top, belly and rear armored areas. It is well suited for the attack of other less heavily protected armored fighting vehicles (AFV) and in the breaching of material targets (buildings, bunkers, bridge supports, etc.). The newer rod projectiles may be effective against the more heavily armored areas of MBTs. Weapons using the EFP principle have already been used in combat; the "smart" submunitions in the CBU-97 cluster bomb used by the US Air Force and Navy in the 2003 Iraq war employed this principle, and the US Army is reportedly experimenting with precision-guided artillery shells under Project SADARM (Seek And Destroy ARMor). There are also various other projectile (BONUS, DM 642) and rocket submunitions (Motiv-3M, DM 642) and mines (MIFF, TMRP-6) that use EFP principle. Examples of EFP warheads are US patents 5038683 and US6606951.

=== Tandem warhead ===
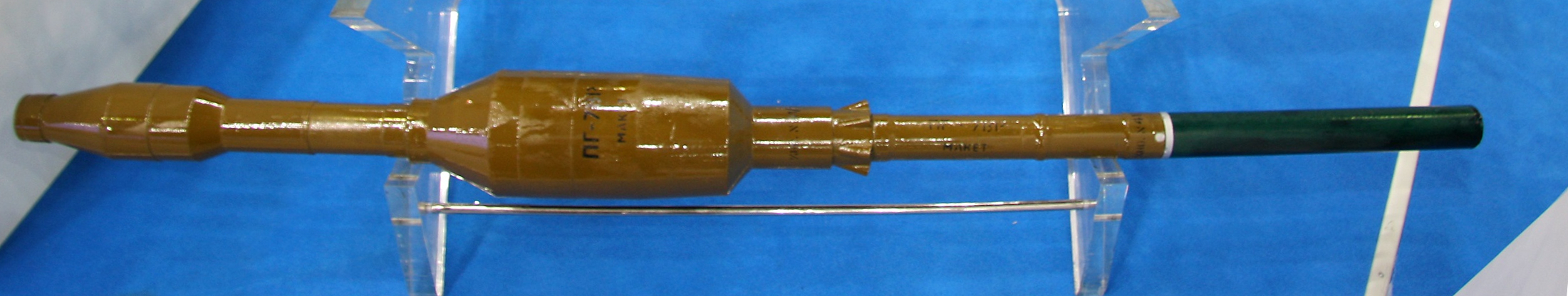
A PG-7VR ammunition for the RPG-7 grenade launcher, equipped with a tandem warhead.

Some modern anti-tank rockets (RPG-27, RPG-29) and missiles (TOW-2, TOW-2A, Eryx, HOT, MILAN) use a tandem warhead shaped charge, consisting of two separate shaped charges, one in front of the other, typically with some distance between them. TOW-2A was the first to use tandem warheads in the mid-1980s, an aspect of the weapon which the US Army had to reveal under news media and Congressional pressure resulting from the concern that NATO antitank missiles were ineffective against Soviet tanks that were fitted with the new ERA boxes. The Army revealed that a 40 mm precursor shaped-charge warhead was fitted on the tip of the TOW-2 and TOW-2A collapsible probe

Usually, the front charge is somewhat smaller than the rear one, as it is intended primarily to disrupt ERA boxes or tiles. Examples of tandem warheads are US patents 7363862 and US 5561261. The US Hellfire antiarmor missile is one of the few that have accomplished the complex engineering feat of having two shaped charges of the same diameter stacked in one warhead. Recently, a Russian arms firm revealed a 125mm tank cannon round with two same diameter shaped charges one behind the other, but with the back one offset so its penetration stream will not interfere with the front shaped charge's penetration stream. The reasoning behind both the Hellfire and the Russian 125 mm munitions having tandem same diameter warheads is not to increase penetration, but to increase the beyond-armour effect.

=== Voitenko compressor ===
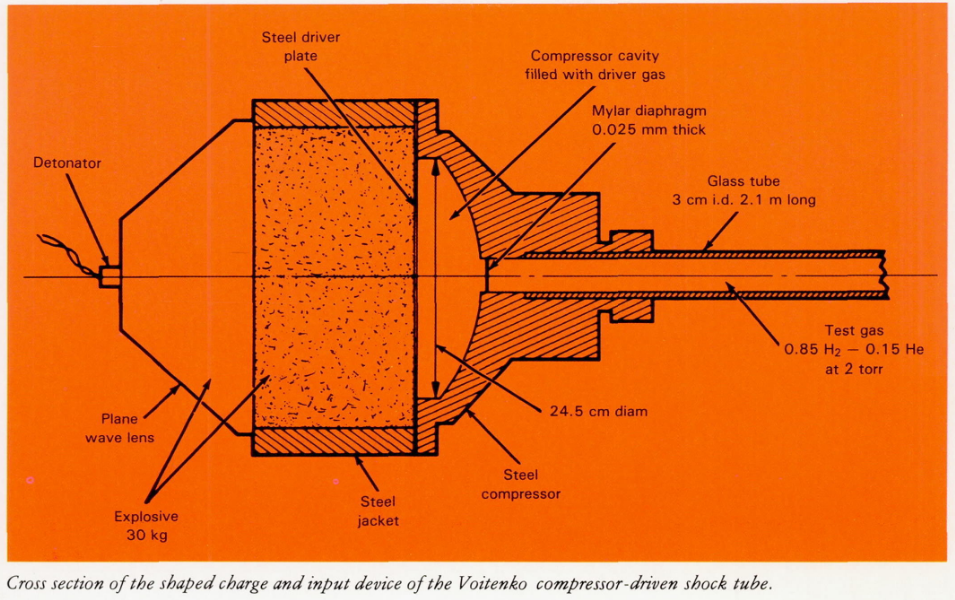
Cross-section diagram of a Voitenko compressor.

In 1964 a Soviet scientist proposed that a shaped charge originally developed for piercing thick steel armor be adapted to the task of accelerating shock waves. The resulting device, looking a little like a wind tunnel, is called a Voitenko compressor. The Voitenko compressor initially separates a test gas from a shaped charge with a malleable steel plate. When the shaped charge detonates, most of its energy is focused on the steel plate, driving it forward and pushing the test gas ahead of it. Ames Laboratory translated this idea into a self-destroying shock tube. A 66-pound shaped charge accelerated the gas in a 3-cm glass-walled tube 2 meters in length. The velocity of the resulting shock wave was 220,000 feet per second (67 km/s). The apparatus exposed to the detonation was completely destroyed, but not before useful data was extracted.

In a typical Voitenko compressor, a shaped charge accelerates hydrogen gas which in turn accelerates a thin disk up to about 40 km/s. A slight modification to the Voitenko compressor concept is a super-compressed detonation, a device that uses a compressible liquid or solid fuel in the steel compression chamber instead of a traditional gas mixture. A further extension of this technology is the explosive diamond anvil cell, utilizing multiple opposed shaped-charge jets projected at a single steel encapsulated fuel, such as hydrogen. The fuels used in these devices, along with the secondary combustion reactions and long blast impulse, produce similar conditions to those encountered in fuel-air and thermobaric explosives.

=== Nuclear shaped charges ===
The proposed Project Orion nuclear propulsion system would have required the development of nuclear shaped charges for reaction acceleration of spacecraft. Shaped-charge effects driven by nuclear explosions have been discussed speculatively, but are not known to have been produced in fact. For example, the early nuclear weapons designer Ted Taylor was quoted as saying, in the context of shaped charges, "A one-kiloton fission device, shaped properly, could make a hole ten feet (3.0 m) in diameter a thousand feet (305 m) into solid rock." Also, a nuclear driven explosively formed penetrator was apparently proposed for terminal ballistic missile defense in the 1960s.

== See also ==
- Explosive lens
- High-explosive squash head
- M150 Penetration Augmented Munition
- List of established military terms
- Glossary of firearms terms
