= M28 =

M28, M-28, or M/28 may refer to:

== Roads ==
- M-28 (Michigan highway), a state highway in Michigan
- M28 (Cape Town), a Metropolitan Route in Cape Town, South Africa
- M28 (Pretoria), a Metropolitan Route in Pretoria, South Africa

== Military ==
=== United States ===
- M28/M-1928 Haversack, US Army haversack
- M28, an American version of the Energa anti-tank rifle grenade
- M28, a training rocket for the M270 Multiple Launch Rocket System where the warhead is replaced by a steel ballast and three smoke canisters.

=== Finland ===
- M28 Mosin–Nagant, a Finnish rifle

=== Italy ===
- Tromboncino M28 grenade launcher, an Italian weapon that attaches to a rifle

== Aircraft ==
- Miles M.28 Mercury, a 1941 British aircraft
- PZL M28 Skytruck, a small Polish transport plane

== Other ==
- Messier 28, a globular cluster in the constellation Sagittarius
- McLaren M28, a Formula One racing car
- A line of 28-volt power tools manufactured by Milwaukee Electric Tool Corporation
