= Carcano =

Italian bolt-action rifle

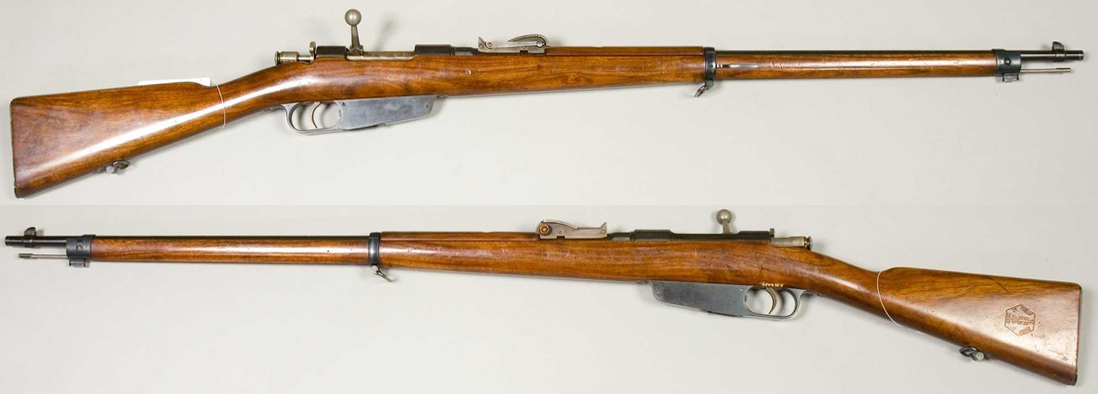
- Fucile Modello 1891 (Model 1891 rifle)
- Type: Bolt-action rifle
- Place of origin: Kingdom of Italy

Service history
- In service: 1894–1981 (Italy); 1894–present (others)
- Used by: See users
- Wars: First Italo-Ethiopian War; Boxer Rebellion; Italo-Turkish War; World War I; Vlora War; Zhili–Anhui War; First Zhili–Fengtian War; Second Zhili–Fengtian War; Northern Expedition; Second Italo-Abyssinian War; Spanish Civil War; Second Sino-Japanese War; Winter War; World War II; Italian Civil War; Indonesian National Revolution; Greek Civil War; 1958 Lebanon crisis; Bale Revolt; Lebanese Civil War; Somali Civil War; Kosovo War; Tuareg rebellion; Libyan Civil War

Production history
- Designer: Salvatore Carcano
- Designed: 1890
- Manufacturer: Brescia Arms Factory; Terni Arms Factory; Turin Arms Factory; Torre Annunziata Arms Factory; Rome Arms Factory; Manifattura Italiana d'Armi; Fabbrica Nazionale d'Armi; Fabbrica d'Armi Pietro Beretta; Anonima Revelli Manifattura Armi Guerra; Metallurgica Bresciana già Tempini; Fabbrica d'Armi Pietro Lorenzotti
- Unit cost: 313 lire (equivalent to $163 in 2025)
- Produced: 1892–1945
- No. built: 5,000,000–6,000,000 of all variants
- Variants: See variants

Specifications (Fucile mod. 91)
- Mass: 3.9 kg (8.6 lb)
- Length: 1,289 mm (50.74 in)
- Barrel length: 780 mm (30.7 in)
- Cartridge: 6.5×52mm Carcano; 7.35×51mm Carcano; 6.5×54mm Mannlicher–Schönauer (Austrian conversions)
- Action: Bolt action
- Muzzle velocity: 730 m/s (2,400 ft/s)
- Feed system: 6−round box magazine, en-bloc clip loaded
- Sights: Quadrant rear sight graduated up to 2,000 m (2,200 yd)

Carcano, Mannlicher-Carcano, Carcano-Mannlicher, and Mauser-Parravicino, are frequently used names for a series of Italian bolt-action, En Bloc clip fed, repeating military rifles and carbines. Introduced in 1891, the rifle was officially designated as the Fucile Modello 1891 (Model 1891 Rifle) and chambered for the rimless 6.5×52mm Carcano round (Cartuccia a pallottola Modello 1891, later updated to Cartuccia a pallottola Modello 1891/95). It was developed by the chief technician Salvatore Carcano at the Turin Army Arsenal in 1890. Replacing the Vetterli-Vitali rifles and carbines in 10.35×47mmR, it was produced until 1945. The Mod.91 family of weapons included both rifle (fucile) and shorter-barreled carbine (moschetto) form and was used by Italian troops during both World War I and World War II. It was also used by Finland, German Volkssturm and the Imperial Japanese Navy (the latter using the Type I rifle variant) during WWII. During the post-war era, the Carcano would see use with both regular and irregular forces in Africa, Asia, and the Middle East.

A Carcano Mod.91/38 rifle was used by Lee Harvey Oswald to assassinate United States President John F. Kennedy on November 22, 1963, in Dallas, Texas.

== Background ==
By 1887, the Vetterli rifles in Italian service were rendered obsolete after the French adopted the Lebel Model 1886 rifle while Italy's main rival, Austria-Hungary adopted the Mannlicher M1888, forcing the Italian government to form a commission to choose a new infantry rifle at the end of 1888. After testing more than 50 different rifles (including designs from Lee and Mauser), the commission decided to adopt a 6.5 mm cartridge using a Mannlicher-type magazine. After conducting trials with a Terni design based on the Gewehr 1888 (fitted with Italian-pattern sights and the barrel jacket removed) and a design developed by a team led by Salvatore Carcano from the arms factory in Turin, the commission recommended Carcano's design on 5 March 1892. The Ministry of War formally approved the rifle for service on March 29, with the first Carcano rifles being issued in the spring of 1894.

Although this rifle is often called "Mannlicher−Carcano", especially in American parlance, it was officially the Fucile Modello 1891 (Model 1891 rifle). The "Mannlicher" title came from the en bloc loading clips system, having nothing to do with the action itself, which was a modified Gewehr 88 action (which itself was a combination of the action from the Mauser Model 1871 with the Mannlicher en bloc loading); in Italy the rifle was commonly reported by army and civilian sources as "Carcano−Mannlicher" since the action engineer is usually named before the magazine designer's in Italian nomenclatures (like with Vetterli-Vitali and others). Some Italian sources also report the name "Mauser−Parravicino", after General Gustavo Parravicino of the Infantry Shooting School and head of the commission that recommended the Mod. 91 adoption. Italian soldiers simply called the rifle as the il novantuno (the ninety-one).

== Description ==
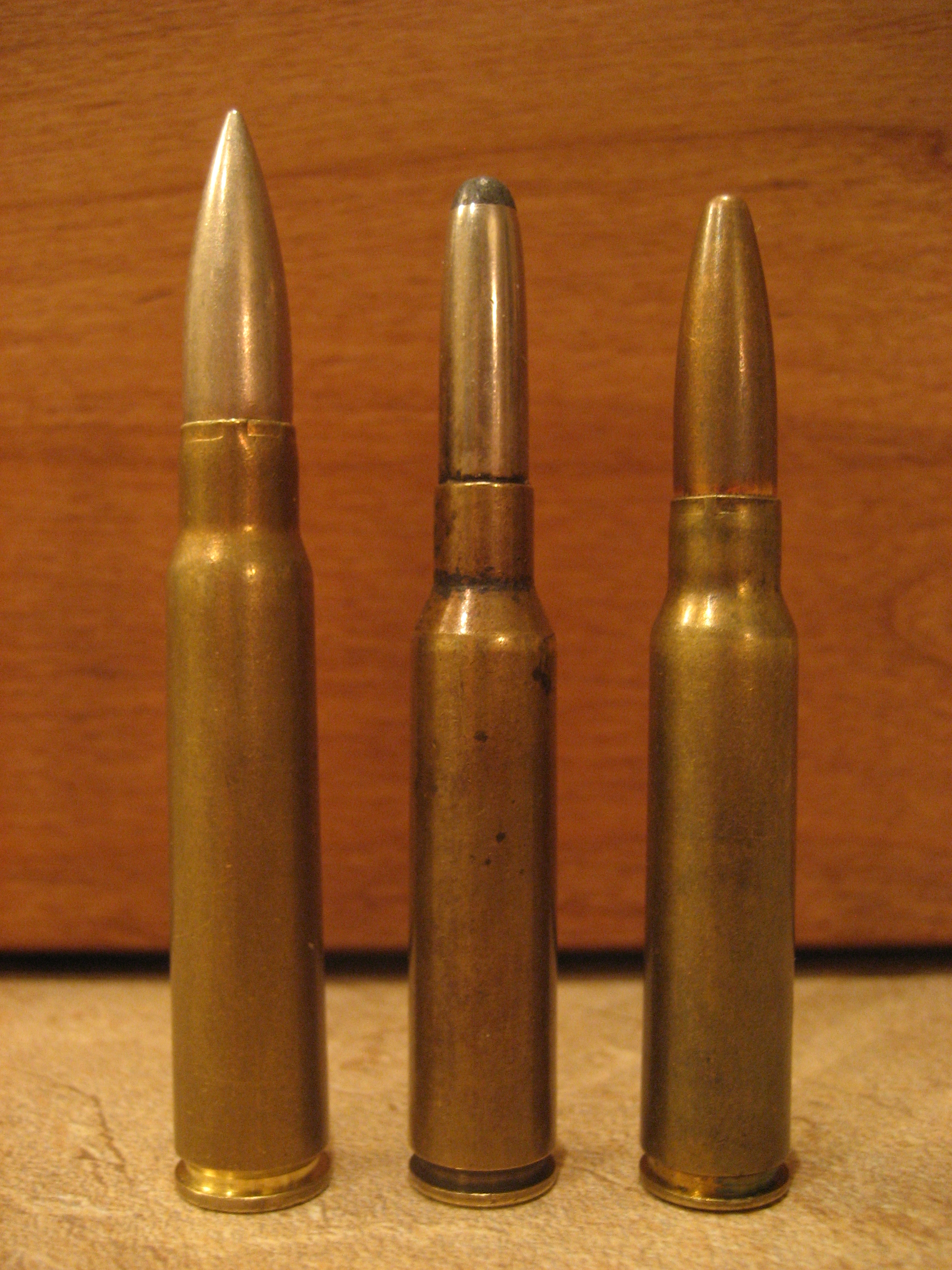
(Left to Right) 7.92mm Mauser (also called 8mm Mauser), 6.5mm Carcano, and 7.35mm Carcano

The Carcano is a family of six-round bolt-action rifles and carbines using a modified Mauser-type action with a Mannlicher-type magazine. Upon introduction the 6.5 mm Carcano cartridge was quite typical of the era, using a round-nosed bullet of relatively modest power. By 1908 most nations switched to the improved spitzer bullet, but Italy was late to adopt a new rifle cartridge and by the time a larger caliber was adopted, the outbreak of WWII prevented the replacement of the 6.5×52mm Carcano, which remained the standard army cartridge until 1945.

While the round-nose bullet quickly lost velocity and consequently stopping power at long ranges, the 6.5 mm round is lethal enough with a well aimed shot. According to a United States Army technical manual, a bullet fired from a Model 91/24 carbine can incapacitate a man (or animal) at a range of 600 m (660 yd).

Early models featured a progressive rifling (also known as gain twist, the twist of the barrel rifling gradually increases towards the muzzle). The gain twist increased the stability and accuracy of the bullet, while decreasing erosion of the rifling, due to less stress imprimed by the bullet. This feature was dropped in the Mod. 41 rifle.

Unlike Austrian Mannlichers, the Carcano used symmetrical clips, while the use of a smaller cartridge allowed one extra round to be carried. The bolt was simpler than the Gewehr 88, and it also featured a safety, which was a projecting plate between the rear of the bolt piece and the cocking piece. The Italians slightly modified the rifle over the years, but the design itself practically remained unchanged for more than 60 years.

Despite often being described as an inaccurate and inferior weapon, especially by Kennedy assassination conspiracy theorists, it is an accurate and capable weapon. Pegler notes that it was used as a sniper rifle by the Italian Army during WWI. He also stated that the Carcano carbines used by Alpini troops proved to be adequate for relatively short-range sniping.

The rifle was described by military historian Ian V. Hogg as "a serviceable enough weapon and on a par with its contemporaries"; According to Pegler, "the basic rifle design was like many others, sound but unexceptional"; Morin stated that "while certainly not representing the best among rifles of the time, [the Mod. 91] was not a completely worthless weapon", adding that "the individual weapon is only one of the factors of a tactical group's firepower"; FBI firearms expert Robert A. Frazier, who test-fired Lee Harvey Oswald's Carcano, testified that it was an accurate weapon.

E. C. Ezell stated that despite rumors of the Carcano being unsafe to fire, "it is as safe as any other military rifle", provided the gun is in good condition and proper ammunition is used.

== History ==
=== Italy ===
Marines with M1891 Carcanos during the Boxer Rebellion in 1900

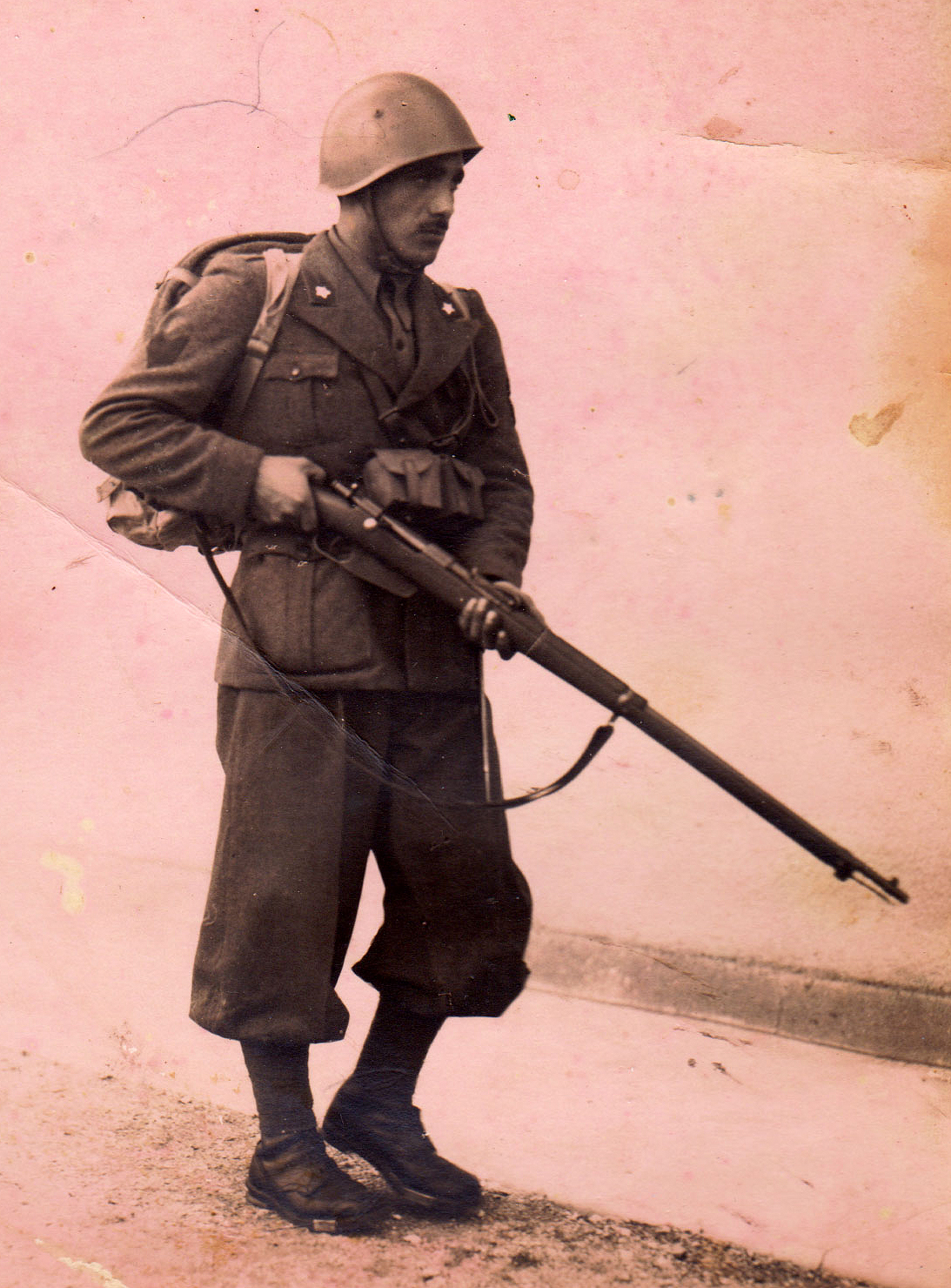
Alpino soldier holding an M1891 Carcano long rifle c. 1942

According to McLachlan, due a shortage of the new 6.5 mm cartridge and the unwillingness of the Crispi government to order more, the first Carcanos were only issued in Italian Eritrea during summer 1896, months after the defeat at the battle of Adwa, forcing the colonial troops and even reinforcements destined to Africa to use the obsolete Vetterli-Vitali rifles and Remington Rolling Blocks (some of the latter taken from the inventories of the defunct Papal States) during the Adwa campaign. According to Prouty, the governor Oreste Baratieri deliberately issued older rifles as a cost-saving measure, making use of readily available stocks of old ammunition. (Note: Prouty mistakenly refers to the M91 Carcanos as "newer Remingtons".)

Prior to the outbreak of World War I in 1914, the Italian Army had a total of 700,000 M1891 rifles produced at government arsenals at Terni, Brescia, Turin, and Torre Annunziata. When the Armistice of 11 November 1918 was signed, the Terni factory alone produced 2,063,750 rifles in total.

During the war, the Italians used scoped M1891s as sniper rifles, while some Alpini soldiers preferred to carry the carbine variant instead. A large variety of scopes were used during the war, including a French-made APX derivate with proprietary mount, known as Amigues, after his patent owner. In early 1916, the Italians started producing a 4× power scope based on German (or Austrian) models, known as "Scheibler", manufactured by the Filotecnica-Salmoiraghi factory.

After the war, to get desperately needed carbines for their operations in the colonial theaters, the Italian Army proceeded by converting the old M1891 rifle to carbine length. Rifle barrels were cut down and grafted (in order to maintain the correct progressive rifling twist) to a length of 450 mm (17.7 in), the bolt handle bent down and the sights improved. This version was accepted for service as the M1891/24.

Experience during the war, as well in North Africa and Abyssinia, indicated that the 6.5 mm round was inadequate in terms of stopping power, and during the 1930s the Terni arsenal began conducting experiments under the supervision of Colonel Giuseppe Mainardi with the cooperation of Bombrini-Parodi-Delfino and Società Metallurgica Italiana for a new cartridge. The resulting 7.35 mm bullet adopted in 1937 could be loaded into the 6.5×52 cartridge gun chambers with minimal alterations. To properly host this new cartridge, the Italians followed the other great powers and adopted a short version of their service infantry rifle, creating the Mod. 38 short rifle, obtained by recycling action and barrels of old mod. 91 rifles. The Terni factory began converting 6.5 mm rifles and carbines to fire the new 7.35×51mm Carcano cartridge as the Mod. 38 family of guns, but in December 1939, foreseeing Italy's involvement in the Second World War, the government decided to withdraw all 7.35 mm guns from frontline service and re-issue the older 6.5 mm versions, to simplify logistics. According to Walter, the 7.35 Mod. 38 rifles and carbines were issued to militia units, while a considerable number were sold to Finland.

The Mod. 38 variants were also fitted with fixed sights at 200 m (220 yd); Italian commanders concluded that using adjustable rear sights graduated up to 1,500–2,000 m (1,600–2,200 yd) was a waste, since most firefights rarely exceeded the 300–400 m (330–440 yd) range, while the average soldier in the heat of the battle wasn't expected to have the composure necessary to adjust his sights according to the enemy movements. Also, Italian Infantry squads rotated mostly around light machine gun crews, while riflemen were mostly intended to offer covering fire.

In 1941, the Italian military returned to a long-barrelled infantry rifle once again (slightly shorter than the original Mod. 91), the Carcano Mod. 91/41, in order to properly exploit the 6.5x52 cartridge, that underperformed in the mod. 38 short rifle barrels. According to Morin, this variant used a conventional barrel rifling and had adjustable rear sights graduated from 200–1,000 m (220–1,090 yd).

According to Riepe and Pettinelli, a small number of M1891/38 rifles, cavalry and TS carbines chambered for the 7.92×57mm Mauser were produced shortly, between December 1944 and March 1945. German documents reported by Riepe and Pettinelli clearly indicates that these conversions got explicitly requested by the Germans to explore the possibility of recycling the hundreds of thousands Carcanos in their inventory, while exploiting their own stocks of ammunitions. Two firms were involved in these conversions, namely Krieghoff (which controlled the former Armaguerra machineries, moved to Vipiteno) and F.N.A. of Brescia. The former converted both rifles (mod. 91/38 and mod. 91/41) and carbines (T.S. and Cavalry) with a wooden block to turn them into single, while F.N.A. focused on converting T.S. and cavalry carbines, developing a 5 round en-bloc clip system to exploit the Mannlicher magazine. The tests made by the German Army reported that both conversions were unsatisfactory so the conversion program was dropped.

After the end of WWII, the Italian Army gradually replaced its Carcanos with Lee-Enfield and M1 Garand rifles, while some units of the Polizia di Stato and Carabinieri continued using M91/38 TS carbines for several years. During the early 1960s, the Italian government decided to sell its remaining inventories as military surplus, mostly to the US market. According to Wheeler, a total of 570,745 rifles were sold to the American company Adam Consolidated Industries, for $1,776,658.54 (equivalent to $18,151,184 in 2025).

=== China ===
In 1920, the Beiyang government ordered 40,000 rifles from an Italian company, despite an arms embargo imposed by the Western powers in 1919, though Ness and Shih stated that most of these may have ended up in the hands of the warlord Cao Kun of the Zhili clique instead, which used both rifle and carbine variants of the Carcano. Cao Kun bought another 14,000 in 1922 and received them in 1924, while his protégé Wu Peifu got 40,000 in 1924. According to Jowett, Wu Peifu signed a $5.6 million deal with an Italian arms dealer in 1922. The warlord Zhang Jingyao of the Hunan province obtained 10,000 rifles just before being ousted. In 1924, the Beiyang government purchased all the cargo onboard a ship including 40,000 M1891 rifles.

According to Ness and Shih, the Carcano was probably well used during the Warlord Era conflicts despite the fact that the 6.5 mm cartridge was non-standard in China.

=== Finland ===
Finnish field artillery soldiers inspecting their M38 Carcanos in July 1941

Approximately 94,500 7.35mm Mod. 38 rifles were shipped to Finland, where they were known as Terni carbines (from the Terni stamp with the royal crown, the seal of the Fabbrica d’armi Regio Esercito di Terni where they were manufactured). They arrived too late for the Winter War, but they were used by security and line-of-communications troops during the Continuation War, though some frontline troops were issued the weapon. According to reports, the Finns disliked the rifle. With its non-standard 7.35 mm caliber, it was problematic to keep frontline troops supplied with good quality, or any ammunition at all, and its non-adjustable rear sight (fixed for 200 m) made it ill-suited for use in precision shooting at the varied ranges encountered by Finnish soldiers during the conflict. Despite this, it's worth noticing that the Finns themselves modified the fixed optics on the rifle to operate from a range of 200 m to only 150 m. Whenever possible, Finnish soldiers discarded the weapon in favor of rifles acquired on the battlefield, including standard models of captured Soviet-made Mosin–Nagant rifles. The latter had the advantage of using commonly available 7.62×54mmR ammunition. By the end of the Continuation War, the remaining Mod. 1938 7.35 mm rifles were issued to the Finnish Navy, as well as anti-aircraft, coastal defense, and other second-line (home front) troops.

In 1957, Finland deemed its remaining stockpiles of Carcanos as obsolete and exported them via Interarms as military surplus in exchange for used Sten submachine guns.

=== Japan ===
To improve the relationship between Japan, Germany and Italy, the Japanese government signed, between 1937 and 1939, a series of trade agreement with these two countries, in order to further their political agenda. One of such trade deals was from the Japanese Defense Ministry, asking the Italian Government about 130,000 rifles for the Manchukuo puppet state's army. By the end of 1938 the contract was signed for the production of 120,000 rifles using the Carcano action fitted with a Japanese Type 38 style stock, bayonet mount and sights; this hybrid design uses an internal Mauser-type box magazine loaded with single 6.5×50mmSR Arisaka rounds or a 5-round stripper clip. This rifle, known as the Type I, was produced by two Italian Arsenals, Terni and Gardone Val Trompia, and by two private industries, such as F.N.A. of Brescia and Beretta. Some rifles had their buttstocks shortened since the average Japanese soldier had a shorter stature compared to his European counterparts. The vast majority of these guns were relegated to training duties, assigned to collaborationist armies or kept in storage. Some rifles however, were captured by American forces in Okinawa, Iwo Jima, and Luzon, in the hands of Imperial Japanese Navy units.

While most older sources give a total of 60,000 rifles ordered, recently discovered primary sources clearly indicate that 130,000 were initially discussed and that the final contract indicate 120,000 guns, confirming the serial number research done by collectors throughout the decades.

=== Other countries ===
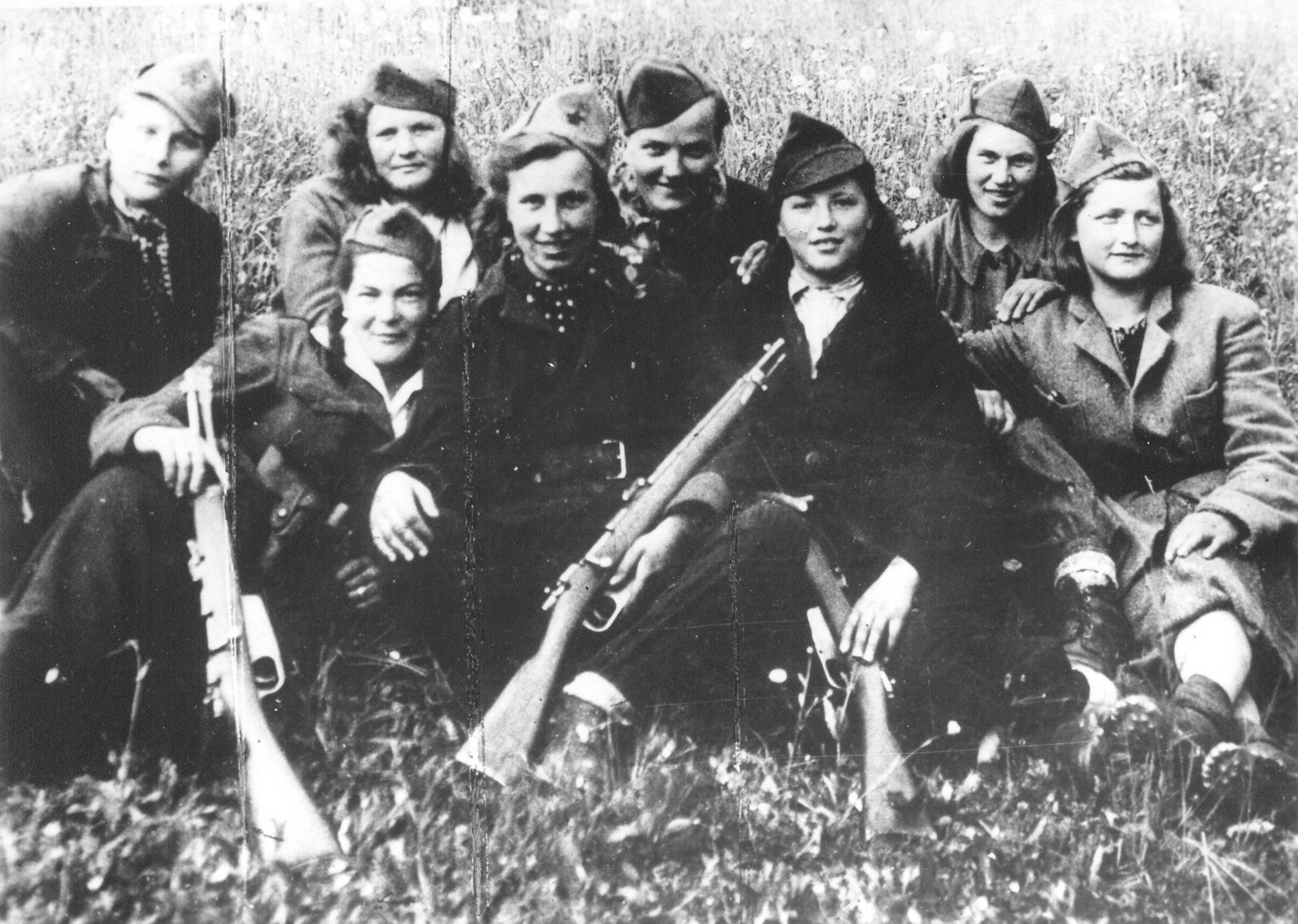
Slovene partisan women with Carcano carbines in May 1943

During World War I, Austria-Hungary converted about 49,500 captured rifles to fire the easily available 6.5×54mm Mannlicher–Schönauer cartridge under the designation 6.5mm M.91 Adaptiertes Italienisches Repetier-Gewehr. After the battle of Caporetto the Austrians captured so many rifles and ammunition that further conversions became unnecessary. Converted rifles sent as war reparations to Italy had their calibers reverted back to the 6.5×52mm Carcano round.

Captured and surplus ex-Italian guns were used by Albania, Ethiopia, Greece and Yugoslavia during and immediately after WWII. Most of them were quickly replaced by other weapons, including the Lee-Enfield and Mauser Kar98k.

Prior to the German invasion in 1941, the Kingdom of Yugoslavia used Mod. 91 rifles under the designation Puska 6.5mm M91 while rifles captured by the Germans received the designation Gewehr 214(j). They were later used by both Chetniks and Yugoslav partisans, with the latter issuing captured guns to support units, while frontline units made use of captured Karabiner 98k rifles.

In September 1943, after Italy surrendered to the Allies the Germans captured a large number of Carcanos and gave them the designations Gewehr 214(i) (Mod. 91), Gewehr 209(i) (6.5 mm Mod. 38) and Gewehr 231(i) (7.35 mm Mod. 38). They were issued in considerable numbers for the Volkssturm militia.

Following the Italian expulsion from Italian East Africa in 1941, they left behind a large number of rifles including Mod. 91, Mod. 38 rifles and even some Mod. 91/24 carbines in Ethiopia. They saw limited use with militias well into the 1950s. Several were exported to the United States as military surplus by Royal Tiger Imports.

According to Hogg, some carbines converted to fire the 7.92 mm Mauser cartridge saw action in Israel and Syria. These guns came from a contract made by Egypt after the second world war (with the intercession of the Italian Government) for the conversion of about 35,000 carbines, for training and support units. After the formation of the United Arab Republic in 1958, these guns found their way to Syria and consequently to the hands of Israeli units through combat.

In the early 1990s during the Somali Civil War, hundreds of M91 rifles (mostly in poor condition or virtually useless) were captured alongside modern Western and Soviet weapons from the troops of local warlords and later destroyed.

During the Libyan Civil War in 2011, many rebels went into battle with their personally-owned weapons, including old bolt-action rifles and shotguns. Of these, Carcano-style rifles and carbines have been the most frequently observed style of bolt-action rifle. They were predominantly used by rebels in the Nafusa Mountains. These old weapons saw combat once again due to the rebels' limited access to modern firearms. Additionally, some Libyan rebels preferred to use their familiar hunting weapons over the more modern, yet unfamiliar, assault rifles available. According to Al-Fitouri Muftah, a member of the rebel military council overseeing the western mountain front, as many as 1 in 10 rebels in the region were armed with World War II-era weapons.

== Variants ==
All variants used the same Carcano bolt action, fed by a six-round en-bloc clip (with the exception of the Type I rifle and 7.92 Mauser conversions). While all pre-World War II 6.5 mm variants have a right-hand progressive rifling 489–210 mm (19.25–8.25 in) from the breech to the muzzle, the 7.35 mm variants have a constant right-hand 250 mm (10 in) twist.

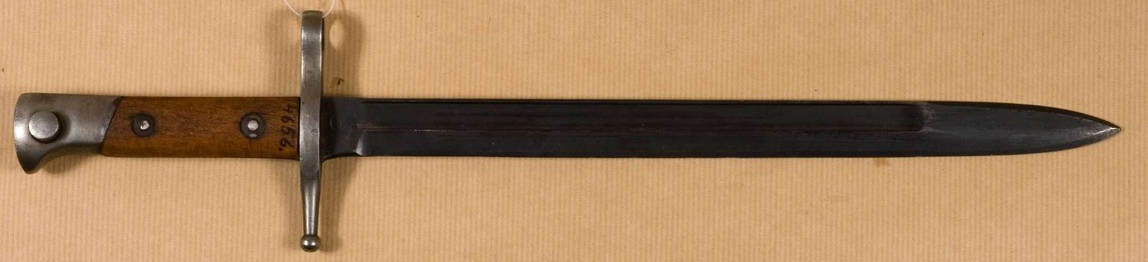
Model 91 Bayonet

- M1891 rifle (Fucile Mod. 1891) − Formally approved for service on 29 March 1892, it uses a single-piece stock with a protruding magazine and is fitted with an adjustable rear sight graduated up to 2,000 m (2,200 yd). A Model 91 sword bayonet can be attached. About 4−4.5 million were produced by 1937.

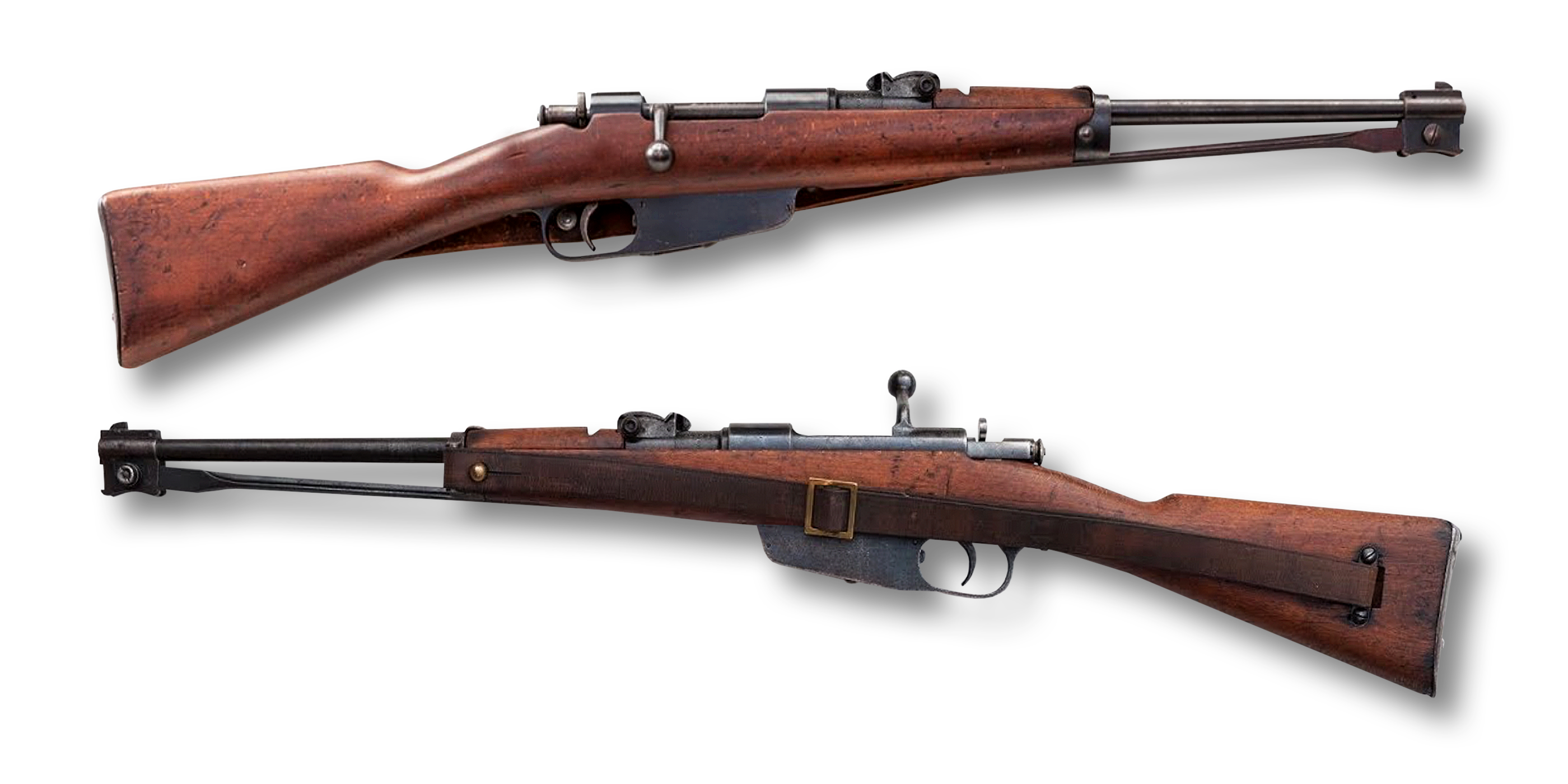
Carcano Model 1891 "Cavalry" carbine

- M1891 carbine (Moschetto Mod. 1891) − Adopted on 9 June 1893, for cavalry, carabinieri, and later for cyclists, it uses a walnut stock with a folding bayonet beneath the muzzle. The adjustable rear sight was graduated up to 1,500 m (1,600 yd) while the bolt handle was bent down. These guns were produced exclusively by the Brescia Arsenal until its foreclosure in 1922, then they got produced by other Arsenals (Terni and Gardone Val Trompia) and Private industries (F.N.A., Beretta). Informally nicknamed "Cavalry Carbine".
- M1891 TS carbine (Moschetto Mod. 1891 per Truppe Speciali) − Carbine adopted in 1897, it's slightly heavier than the Mod. 91 carbine and is fitted with a longer stock and handguard. While the TS designation means "special troops", this variant was issued to support units, such as line-of-communication troops, drivers, and artillery crews who used a rifle as a last resort weapon.
- M1891 Royal Carabinieri King's guard carbine (Moschetto da Carabinieri Reali Guardie del Re, Mod. 1891) − A variant of the M1891 T.S. carbine used by the Squadrone Reali Carabinieri Guardie del Re and later the Italian Republic's presidential guard. The bolt handle, nose cap, magazine body, and parts of the rear sight were gilded while the other metal parts were blued.
- M1891/24 carbine (Moschetto Mod. 1891/24) − Carbine conversion of the Mod. 91 infantry rifle. The original sights were retained, but slightly modified to compensate for the reduced muzzle velocity. It can accept the Model 91 sword bayonet, while the bolt handle was bent down
- Tromboncino M28 grenade launcher (Moschetto con Tromboncino mod. 28) − A Mod. 91 TS carbine with an integral grenade launcher mounted on the right side of the barrel. Unlike other rifle grenades, the M28 uses regular ball cartridges instead of blanks to propel the grenades. It had the drawbacks of being heavy and leaving the grenadier defenseless during use, since he had to remove the bolt of the rifle and put in on the breech of the launcher to do so. It was replaced by the Brixia Model 35 mortar.
- Model youth carbine (Moschetto Regolamentare Balilla Mod. 1891) − Training carbine issued to Fascist Youth members, it uses a 367 mm (14.43 in) barrel and is fitted with a bayonet, but it can only fire blank cartridges.

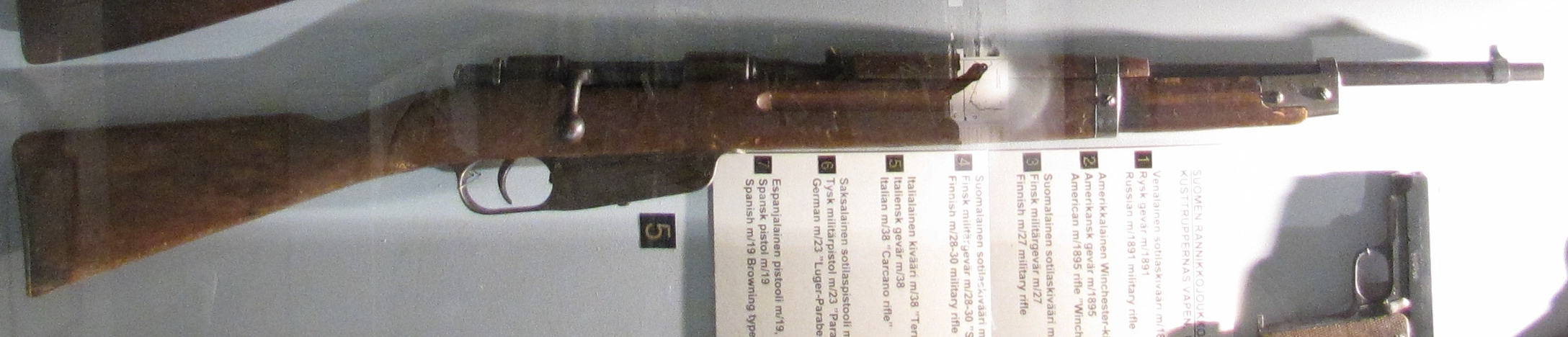
Carcano Model 1938 infantry rifle

- M1938 short rifle (Fucile Mod. 1938) − Infantry rifle designed to convert existing stocks of Mod. 91 long rifles in a modern short rifle configuration. Chambered for the 7.35×51mm Carcano cartridge, it's fitted with 200m zero fixed sights, a bent down bolt handle and a detachable folding knife bayonet.
- M1938 carbine (Moschetto Mod. 1938) − Mostly converted from M91 carbines, it retains the folding bayonet while the barrel was drilled and rifled to accept the 7.35 cartridge.
- M1938 TS carbine (Moschetto Mod. 1938 per Truppe Speciali) − Similar to the M1938 carbine, but it uses the M91 sword bayonet.

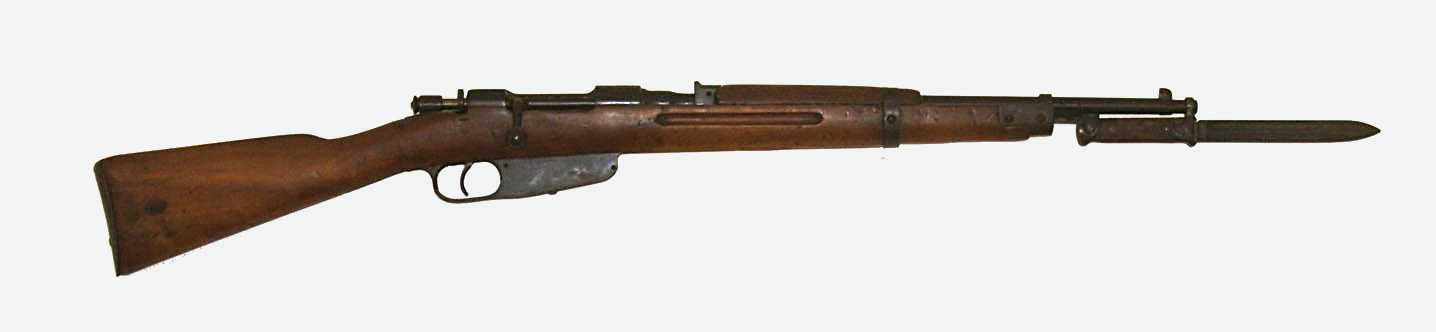
Carcano Model 1891/38 Infantry rifle

- M1891/38 short rifle (Fucile Mod. 1891/38) − A modified M1891 infantry rifle introduced in December 1939, identical to the M1938 short rifle, just produced from scratch in 6.5x52.Iit's fitted with 300m zeroed fixed sights and the M1938 knife bayonet can be attached to the muzzle.
- M1891/38 carbine (Moschetto Mod. 1891/38) − New production 6.5x52 carbines, 300m fixed sights, fitted with the usual carbine folding bayonet.
- M1891/38 TS carbine (Moschetto Mod. 1891/38 per Truppe Speciali) − New production 6.5x52 TS carbines, 300m fixed sights, uses the m91 sword bayonet.
- M1940 rifle (Fucile Mod. 40) − An improved version of the M91 infantry rifle fitted with a distinctive turndial adjustable rear sight, it didn't enter full-scale production.
- M1941 rifle (Fucile Mod. 41) − Credited to Major Roberto Boragine, it has a shorter barrel than the M91 rifle (but longer than the M38) and is fitted with adjustable sights graduated up to 1,000 m (1,100 yd). Conventional rifling replaced the original progressive variety. About 600 000 rifles were made before Italy's surrender in 1943, but production continued under German supervision at the Armaguerra plants in Cremona.
- 7.92mm Mauser conversions − After the Italian surrender, the Germans converted some captured Carcanos to chamber and fire the 7.92×57mm Mauser cartridge. According to Pettinelli, around 35,000 of these conversions (including guns assembled post-war) were sold to Middle Eastern countries.
- Type I rifle − A Carcano-action with an Mauser-type box magazine chambered for the 6.5×50mmSR Arisaka cartridge. It's fitted with Japanese-style sights and bayonet mount.

== Specifications ==
Carcano-type rifles comparison
Model	Cartridge	Length	Weight	Barrel	Magazine	Muzzle velocity
M1891 rifle	6.5×52mm Carcano	1,289 mm (50.74 in)	3.9 kg (8.6 lb)	780 mm (30.71 in), 4 grooves	6-round en bloc clip	730 m/s (2,400 ft/s)
M1891 cavalry carbine	6.5×52mm Carcano	953 mm (37.5 in)	2.79 kg (6.15 lb)	451 mm (17.75 in), 4 grooves	6-round en bloc clip	635 m/s (2,083 ft/s)
M1891 TS	6.5×52mm Carcano	953 mm (37.5 in)	3.3 kg (7.2 lb)	451 mm (17.75 in), 4 grooves	6-round en bloc clip	635 m/s (2,083 ft/s)
M1891/24	6.5×52mm Carcano	953 mm (37.5 in)	2.79 kg (6.15 lb)	451 mm (17.75 in), 4 grooves	6-round en bloc clip	635 m/s (2,083 ft/s)
M1891/38 short rifle	6.5×52mm Carcano	1,020 mm (40.16 in)	3.7 kg (8.2 lb)	562 mm (22.13 in), 4 grooves	6-round en bloc clip	
M1938 short rifle	7.35×51mm Carcano	1,020 mm (40.16 in)	3.7 kg (8.2 lb)	562 mm (22.13 in), 4 grooves	6-round en bloc clip	755 m/s (2,477 ft/s)
M1938 carbine	7.35×51mm Carcano	953 mm (37.5 in)	2.79 kg (6.15 lb) or 3.3 kg (7.2 lb)	451 mm (17.75 in), 4 grooves	6-round en bloc clip	725 m/s (2,378 ft/s)
M1941 rifle	6.5×52mm Carcano	1,170 mm (46.1 in)	3.72 kg (8.21 lb)	690 mm (27.2 in)	6-round en bloc clip	720 m/s (2,360 ft/s)
Type I rifle	6.5×50mmSR Arisaka	1,260 mm (49.7 in)	4.07 kg (8.97 lb)	780 mm (30.6 in), 4 grooves	5-round box magazine	

== Users ==
- Albania
- Austria-Hungary: Captured during World War I, about 49,500 were converted to use the available 6.5×54mm Mannlicher–Schönauer cartridges.
- China − Used mostly by the Zhili clique
- Independent State of Croatia
- Ethiopian Empire: captured from the Italian forces in 1896 or acquired after World War I. Still in use with irregular forces in the 1950s.
- Egypt
- Finland Known as 7.35 kiv/38 "Terni" (7.35mm Rifle 1938 "Terni") in Finnish Service
- German Empire
- Greece
- Indonesia, used during Indonesian National Revolution, limited use due to scarcity of ammunition.
- Italy
  - Kingdom of Italy
  - Italian Social Republic
- Empire of Japan: Purchased the Type I Rifle on contract.
- Libya
- Malta
- Mali: People's Movement for the Liberation of Azawad
- Nazi Germany
- Netherlands: The British sent captured Carcanos to the Royal Netherlands East Indies Army
- Persia
- Romania
- Saudi Arabia
- Somalia
- Syria: M91 carbines used after the 1946 Syrian independence
- Tunisia: M91 rifles used by the Neo Destour
- United Arab Republic: Purchased M38 rifles manufactured post-WWII and chambered for 8mm Mauser.
- Yugoslavia − Designated as the Puska 6.5mm M91. Also used by the Chetniks and Yugoslav Partisans.

== Kennedy assassination rifle ==
Carcano Model 1891/38 short rifle (Fucile mod. 91/38) with a 4-power Ordnance Optics scope used by Lee Harvey Oswald to assassinate John F. Kennedy.

In March 1963, Lee Harvey Oswald purchased a "6.5 [mm] Italian carbine" which was erroneously reported to have been a Mod. 38 carbine (a 7.65 mm variant) while the Dallas Police Department initially reported as being a "7.65 mm Mauser" or an "Italian Mauser", through mail order, for $19.95 (equivalent to $210 in 2025). (Note: Oswald sent a $20.45 (equivalent to $215 in 2025) mail order to pay for the postage.) The advertisement only specified a "6.5 Italian Carbine" and actually shows a scoped Suprema carbine, a purpose built carbine obtained by the importer by shortening thousands of Fucile Mod. 91 to 40". The Carcano carbine model sold through the ad when it was originally placed was described as a 36-inch (91 cm) carbine, so most probably a T.S. carbine. However, from a time 11 months before Oswald placed his order, the Chicago sporting goods store from which he purchased it had been shipping the slightly longer 40.2-inch (102 cm) Model 91/38 under the same ad, and this is the weapon Oswald received.

On 22 November 1963, Oswald used this weapon to assassinate U.S. President John F. Kennedy. The rifle, made in the Terni arsenal in 1940 and bearing the serial number C2766, was equipped for an extra $7 with a new 4x18 Japanese telescopic sight, on a sheet metal side mount. It was later scrutinized by local police, the FBI, the U.S. Army and two federal commissions. Shooting tests, conducted by those groups and others using the original rifle or similar models, addressed questions about the speed and accuracy with which the Carcano could be fired. Following lawsuits over its ownership, the rifle ended up in storage at the National Archives. The assassination was one of the factors leading to passage of the Gun Control Act of 1968, which banned mail order sales of firearms.

== See also ==
- List of common World War II infantry weapons
