= John F. Kennedy assassination rifle =

Weapon used in Kennedy's assassination

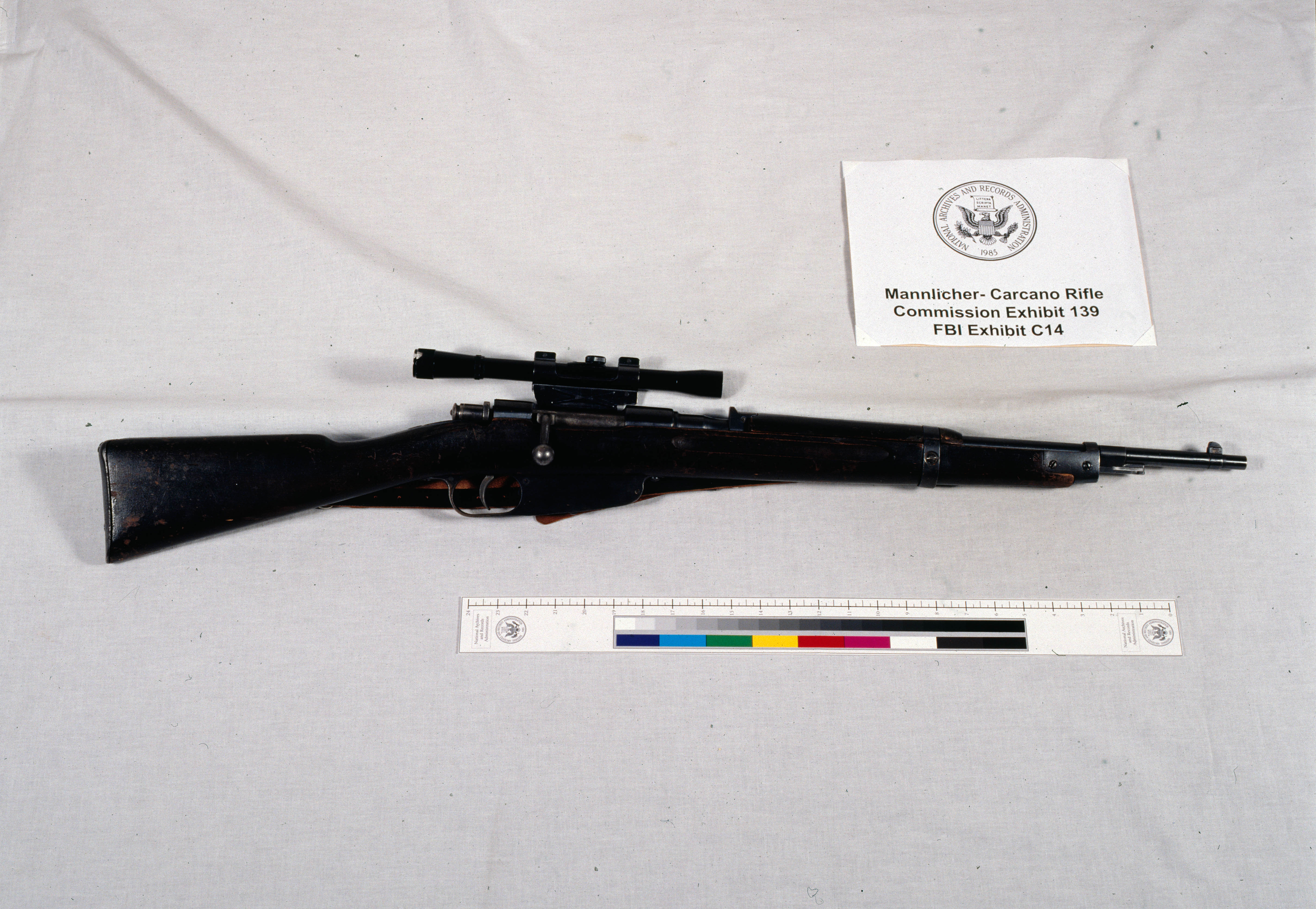
The 6.5 mm Carcano rifle formerly owned by Lee Harvey Oswald

On November 22, 1963, John F. Kennedy, the 35th President of the United States, was assassinated using a 6.5×52mm Carcano Model 38 rifle.

In March 1963, Lee Harvey Oswald, using the alias "A. Hidell", purchased by mail order the infantry carbine (described by the Warren Commission as a "Mannlicher–Carcano") with a telescopic sight. He also purchased a revolver from a different company, by the same method. The Hidell alias was determined from multiple sources to be Oswald. Oswald fired the rifle from the Texas School Book Depository in Dallas, Texas, mortally wounding Kennedy as his presidential motorcade drove by on November 22, 1963, at 12:30 p.m. Central Standard Time. Photographs of Oswald holding the rifle, a palmprint found upon examination of the rifle, and detective work tracing its sale, all eventually led to Oswald. Marina Oswald later testified she was told by Lee that the rifle was also used before in an attempt to assassinate retired U.S. Army General Edwin Walker in Dallas.

== History of the Carcano rifle ==
The Oswald rifle is an Italian Fucile di Fanteria (Eng: Infantry rifle) Modello 91/38 (Model 1891/1938) manufactured at the Royal Arms Factory in Terni, (Regia fabbrica d'armi di Terni), Italy, in 1940. The stamp of the royal crown and "Terni" identifies this manufacturing site. Its serial number identified it as the single weapon of its type made with that number. The so-called Model 91 bolt-action rifle had been introduced in 1891 by Salvatore Carcano for the Turin Army Arsenal. After 1895, the Modello 91 used an en bloc ammunition clip similar (but not identical) to the Austrian Mannlicher ammunition clips, and hence the names of Mannlicher and Carcano came to be associated with the Oswald rifle; this included association with them by the Warren Commission. The ammunition used in the clip was the 6.5×52mm Cartuccia Modello 1895 rimless cartridge (designed in 1890), also sometimes called Mannlicher–Carcano ammunition, after the rifle designer and the general type of clip it used.

In 1938, the basic Model 91 long rifle design was discontinued in favor of a new short rifle design, the Model 38, with a new type of ammunition: a spitzer-pointed 7.35×51mm round. The 7.35mm M38 was manufactured from 1938 to 1940. In 1940, with World War II well under way and unable to stockpile sufficient amounts of 7.35×51mm ammunition, the short rifles were re-designated Modello 91/38, and were again manufactured to fire the original round-nosed 6.5×52mm ammunition. The serial-numbered C2766 rifle, sent to Oswald as a surplus advertised "Italian carbine" in 1963, was a short infantry rifle of this type, manufactured for the 6.5×52mm cartridge. This 6.5mm Carcano M91/38 was only manufactured for two years, 1940–1941, and discontinued in favor of a new 6.5mm long rifle, the M91/41, which was made until the end of the war.

The C2766 rifle was included in a surplus lot sold by the Italian Army, through a tender, to the New York company Adam Consolidated Industries. Before its shipment to New York Harbor in September 1960, the rifles were refurbished in Storo, Trentino at the Riva plant (which worked for the Beretta Group).

== Purchase of the revolver ==
On October 9, 1962, Lee Harvey Oswald rented post office box number 2915 in Dallas, Texas. On January 27, 1963, Oswald used this PO box and the name "A. J. Hidell" to order a snub-nosed Smith & Wesson "Victory" Model .38 Special revolver from Seaport Traders of Los Angeles for $29.95 (equivalent to $315 in 2025) plus postage and handling. Seaport Traders shipped the pistol cash-on-delivery by rail on March 20 but due to policies to prevent shipping firearms to minors, Oswald was required to pick it up in-person at the Railway Express Agency offices in Dallas.

== Purchase of the Carcano ==
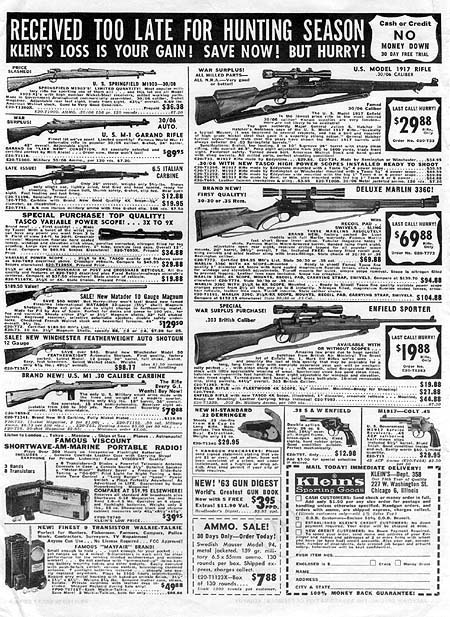
Magazine advertisement through which Oswald purchased the rifle (left column, third from top). The ad photo for a "6.5 Italian Carbine" actually shows a telescopically modified Carcano TS carbine, but by the time of Oswald's order Klein's was shipping the longer Carcano Model 91/38's.

On March 12, 1963, Oswald placed his second mail-order: this time it was for the mentioned "6.5 Italian Carbine" from Klein's Sporting Goods located in Chicago, as advertised in the February 1963 American Rifleman. Using the alias "Alek Hidell", a variation of the "A.J. Hidell" alias employed to purchase the Smith & Wesson pistol five weeks earlier, Oswald purchased the rifle (model not given in the advertisement), complete with an attached new 4x telescopic sight, for $19.95 (equivalent to $210 in 2025) plus $1.50 shipping. (The rifle alone – without the scope – was priced at $12.78.) Like the handgun, this was also shipped to Oswald at his post office box in Dallas, also on March 20.

The rifle portrayed in the ad and the rifle Oswald received were not the same. Klein's Sporting Goods had initially shipped surplus 36-inch-long (91 cm) Carcano model M91 TS carbines ("moschettos") under their "Italian carbine" ad. However, effective April 13, 1962, Crescent Firearms, the wholesale supplier of Italian rifles to Klein's, had been unable to supply Carcano TS carbines, and had switched to surplus Carcano M91/38's, which fired the same 6.5 x 52mm ammunition. The M91/38 rifles were a slightly longer 40.1-inch (102 cm) version of the short infantry Carcano TS and had a 20.9-inch (53 cm) barrel rather than the 17.7-inch (45 cm) barrel of the TS carbine model. They also had a completely left-side-mounted sling rather than the under-stock sling of the TS. Thus, while Oswald got a slightly longer M91/38, which was not quite the same Italian rifle shown in the advertisement photograph (the ad photo was not changed until April 1963), he did get a very similar telescope-modified Italian 6.5 mm short rifle.

Oswald asked his wife Marina in late March to take several photographs of him posing in their backyard with the rifle and pistol and holding copies of the newspapers The Worker and The Militant. Three of the photographs were discovered among Oswald's belongings on November 23.

== Walker shooting ==
Marina Oswald testified that Lee told her on April 10, 1963, that he had used the rifle earlier that night in an attempt to assassinate retired U.S. Army General Edwin Walker, a controversial political activist, at Walker's home in Dallas. The bullet was deflected from hitting Walker when it struck a window frame. Oswald escaped, hiding the rifle and retrieving it a day or two later. Jeanne De Mohrenschildt, an acquaintance of the Oswalds, testified that when she and her husband George visited the Oswalds on April 13, she saw a rifle, that "looked very much like" the Carcano, standing in the corner of a closet. When she told George what she had just seen, he joked to Lee, "Did you take a pot shot at Walker by any chance?"

The De Mohrenschildts later found a copy of one of the backyard photographs, dated by hand 5 April 1963 (in Russian) and autographed by Oswald on the back with the message "To my friend George from Lee Oswald" in a record album they had loaned to Marina before the De Mohrenschildts moved to Haiti in May 1963.

== Discovery and handling of the Carcano rifle in the Texas School Book Depository ==
The Warren Commission found that, in the weeks before the assassination, Oswald kept the rifle wrapped in a blanket and hidden in the garage of friends Michael and Ruth Paine, where Marina was living at the time and where Oswald would occasionally visit. Michael Paine described "a package wrapped in a blanket", which he thought was camping equipment. He did find this odd, saying to himself "they don't make camping equipment of iron pipes any more". Marina testified that, after she and Lee moved their belongings to the Paine home in September 1963, she found the rifle in the blanket while searching for a part for her child's crib.

The Commission concluded that Oswald had smuggled the rifle into the Texas School Book Depository on the morning of the assassination, November 22, 1963, in a brown paper package, which he had told a co-worker contained "curtain rods", although Oswald later denied this, and said that he carried only a lunch bag that day. He also said that he did not own a rifle.

About half an hour after the assassination of President Kennedy, a floor-by-floor search of the Texas School Book Depository Building was commenced by Dallas police, joined by sheriff's deputies. The rifle was found by Deputy Sheriff Seymour Weitzman and Officer Gene Boone among cartons on the sixth floor.

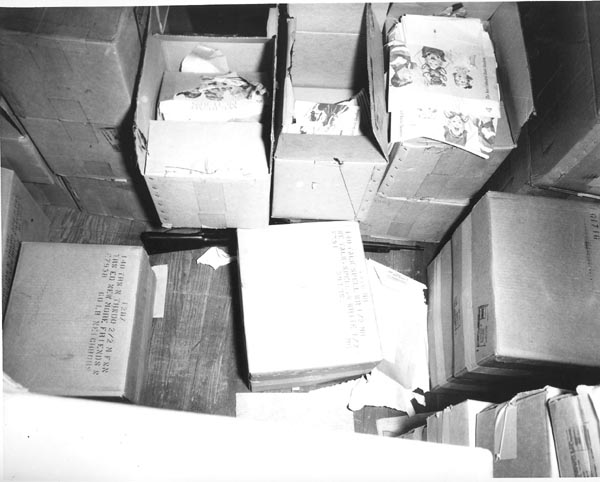
Position of rifle when found on the 6th floor of the Depository Building

The two officers who found the rifle—and later Captain Fritz—picked it up by the sling, but did not handle it until the arrival of Lt. Carl Day of the crime scene search section of the identification bureau. Lt. Day then held the rifle by the stock, in one hand, "because it was too rough to hold a fingerprint" and inspected the rifle with a magnifying glass in his other hand. He checked that the bolt had no prints on it before Fritz ejected a live round.

Also found in the same vicinity were three 6.5×52mm brass cartridges later proven to have been fired from Oswald's rifle. One of the empty cartridges, CE 543, was dented in the area of the neck. Ballistic experts testified to the House Select Committee on Assassinations (HSCA) that this likely occurred when the rifle was rapidly fired and the cartridge was ejected. When four test bullets were fired from the rifle, one of the four cartridges had a dented neck, similar to CE 543.

The rifle was subjected to further forensic examination at the laboratory. Lt. Day discovered a palm print on part of the rifle that could only have been put there when the rifle was not fully assembled. Such a palm print could not be placed on this portion of the rifle when assembled because the wooden foregrip covers the barrel. Lt. Day did not complete his investigation, however, because he was told to stop, and to hand the rifle over to FBI Agent Vince Drain, because the FBI would finish the investigation. He later did his own research, however, and concluded that the prints were Oswald's, because by then he had Oswald's prints on file.

Police Chief Jesse Curry testified that—despite believing that the FBI had no jurisdiction over the case—he complied with FBI requests to send the rifle and all other evidence to their laboratories in Washington. During the night after Kennedy's murder, the rifle was taken by FBI agent Vincent Drain from Dallas to Washington D.C., who then gave it to FBI agent Robert Frazier. He testified that he kept it in the FBI office until November 27, 1963, whereupon it was sent back to Dallas and given back to someone at the Dallas Police Department for reasons unclear. It was later sent back to the FBI headquarters in Washington.

Sebastian Latona, supervisor of the Latent Fingerprint section of the FBI's Identification Division, testified that the palm print found on the barrel of the rifle belonged to Lee Harvey Oswald. Experts agree that palm prints are as unique as fingerprints for the purpose of establishing identification.

Initially misidentified as being a German-made Mauser rifle, the Dallas police, upon examination in their lab, determined it to be an Italian-made Carcano. The Warren Commission concluded that the initial identification of the rifle as a Mauser was in error. The House Select Committee on Assassinations investigated claims from researchers that the rifle in fact was a Mauser. The Committee compared photos taken by the Dallas police of the rifle in place, a news film of the rifle being recovered, news photos of the rifle being carried from the Depository, numerous news photos and films of the rifle being carried through the halls of the Dallas police headquarters, as well as photos later taken by the FBI and the Dallas police, and compared them to the Carcano rifle held at the National Archives. They concluded the rifle depicted in the photos and films was the same rifle held in the Archives and therefore was the Carcano and not a Mauser.

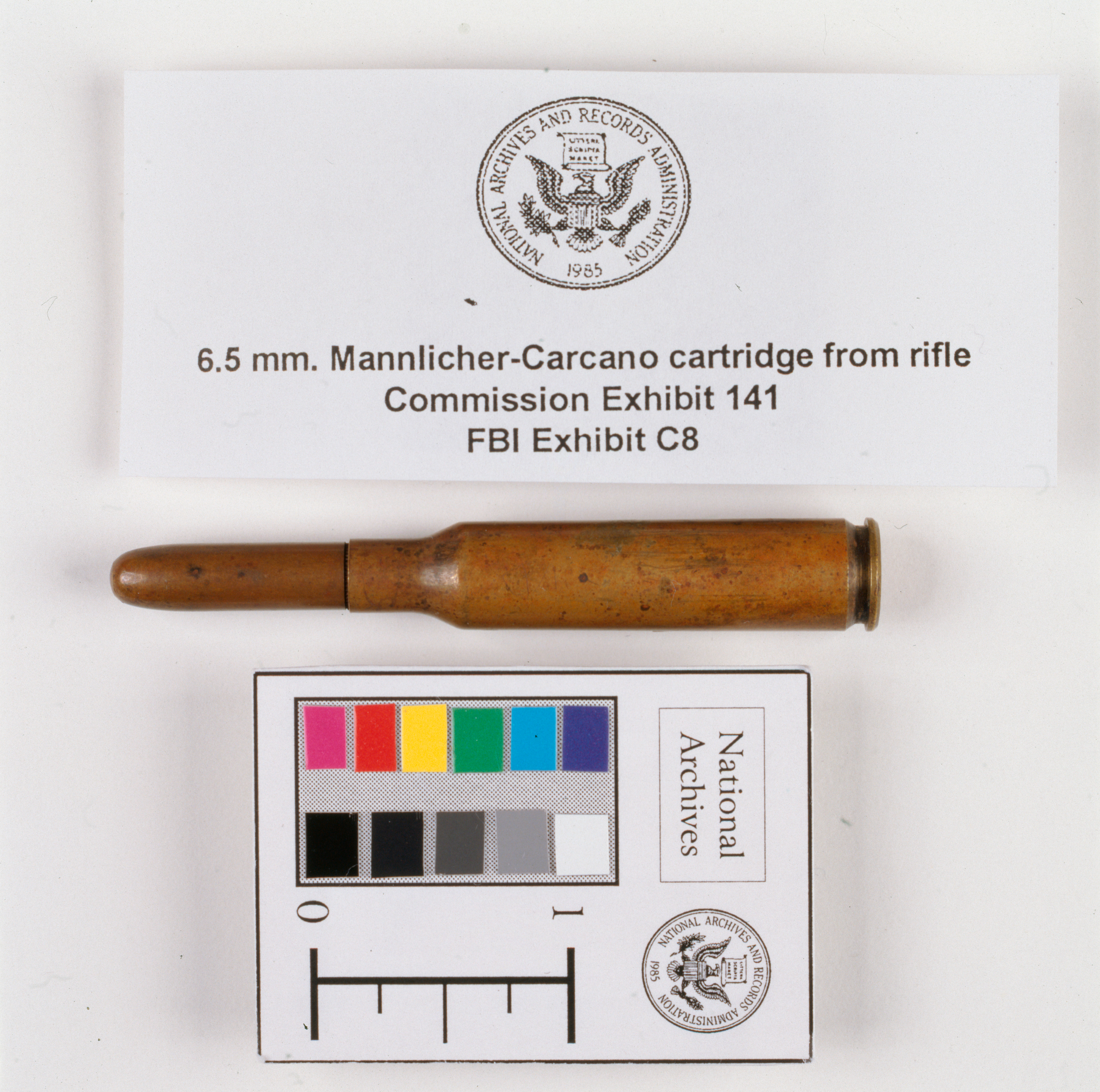
CE-141, or Warren Commission Exhibit 141, the unfired 6.5×52mm round of ammunition left in the assassination rifle

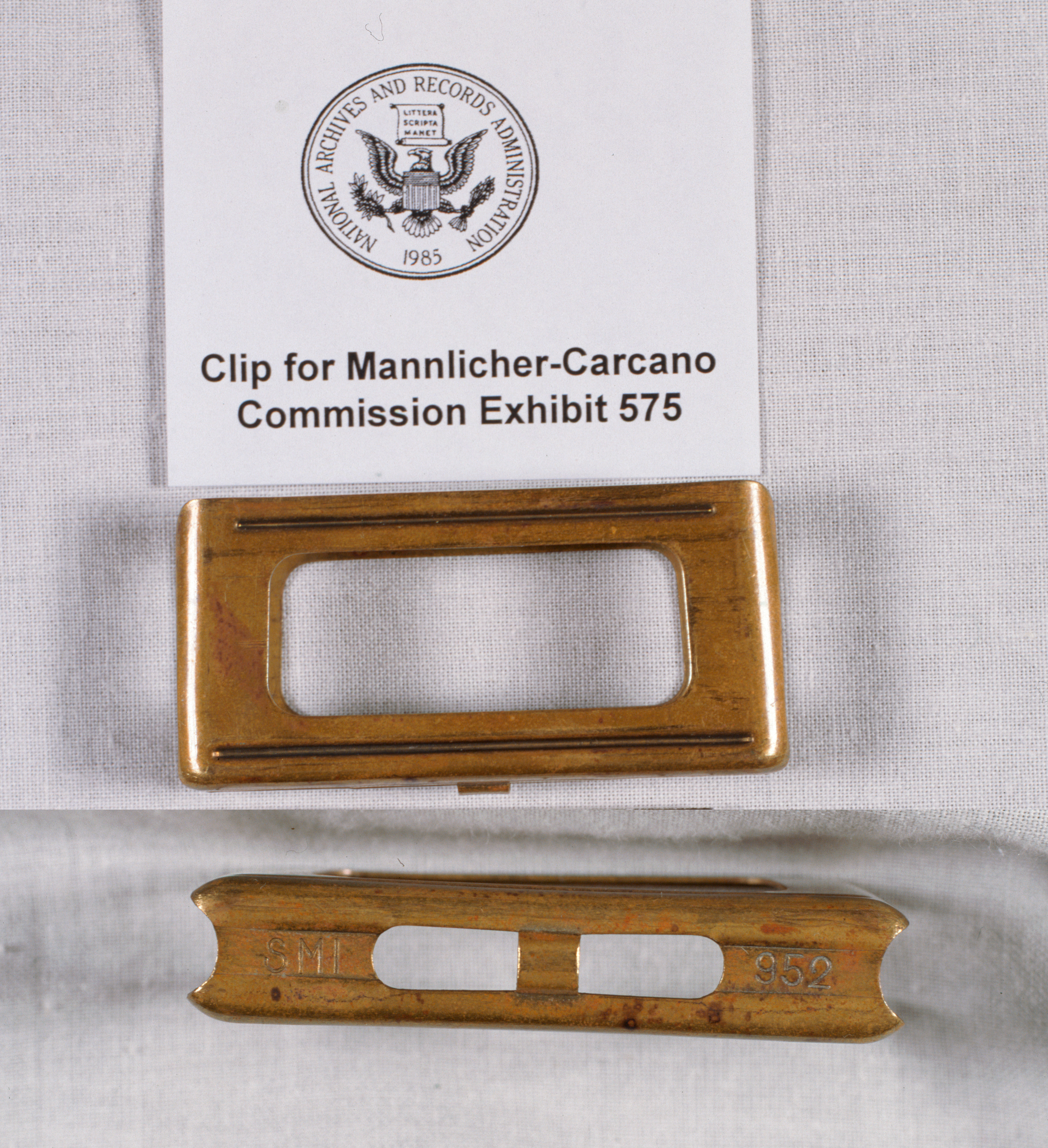
En bloc clip used in Oswald's Carcano rifle

== Characteristics of the Carcano rifle ==
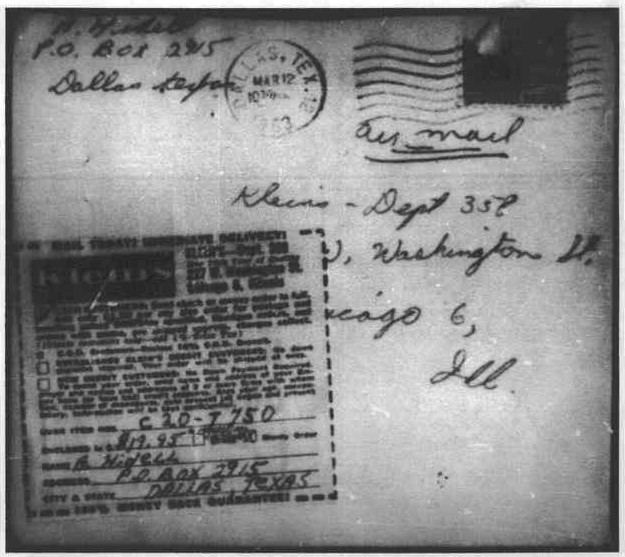
Order form and envelope used by Oswald to purchase the Carcano rifle

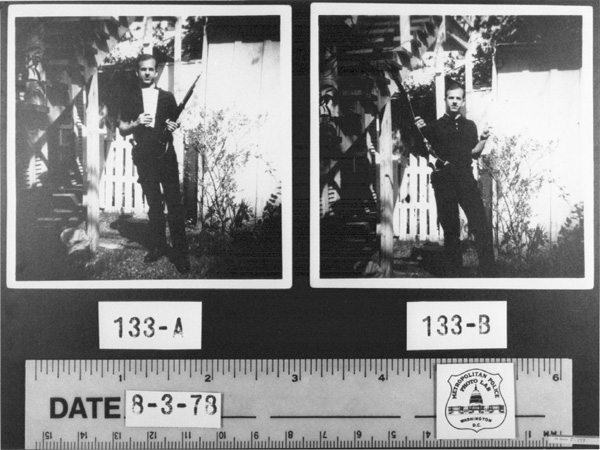
Oswald with the rifle, pistol, and two newspapers, in Dallas in 1963

Rifle details:

- 6.5×52mm Italian Carcano M91/38 bolt-action rifle with a six-round internal magazine
- Serial number C2766. Overall length when assembled: 40.2 inches (102 cm); longest piece when disassembled: 34.8 inches (88 cm)
- Western Cartridge Co. ammunition with a 160-grain (10 g) round nose bullet
- Left mounting sling attachments
- Side-mounted Ordnance Optics 4 × 18 telescopic sight

This surplus-sold rifle had the markings: "CAL. 6.5", "MADE ITALY", and "Terni", (the city of the manufacturer: the Royal Arms factory, Regia fabbrica d'armi di Terni) stamped with the Italian royal crown as part of the Terni factory symbol, and "ROCCA" (the manufacturer of the bolt cocking piece); it also had the serial number C 2766 and the numerals "1940" and "40" (the year of manufacture).

The 4-power telescope, made by Ordnance Optics, had been attached to the rifle by a gunsmith at Klein's Sporting Goods, an American retailer, shortly before being sold as a single unit with the surplus rifle, to Oswald.

Joseph D. Nicol, superintendent of the Illinois Bureau of Criminal Identification and Investigation, and Robert A. Frazier, FBI special agent, testified to the Warren Commission. A distinctive gouge mark and identical dimensions also identify it as the rifle Oswald is holding in several photographs taken in his backyard by his wife in March 1963.

A 6.5×52mm Carcano 160 gr (10 g) round-nosed fully copper-jacketed bullet, of a type normally used in 6.5 mm military rifles (such as the Carcano) was found on Governor Connally's gurney in Parkland Hospital. This bullet (CE 399, see single bullet theory), and two bullet fragments found in the presidential limousine, were ballistically matched to the rifle found in the book depository building. A partial palm print of Oswald was also found on the barrel of the gun.

Agents of the FBI learned on November 22, 1963, from retail gun dealers in Dallas that Crescent Firearms, Inc., of New York City, was a distributor of surplus Italian 6.5-millimeter military rifles. When contacted, Crescent Firearms said that they had shipped the rifle with the serial number C2766 to Klein's Sporting Goods Co., of Chicago. On the morning of November 23, Klein's found the order coupon and shipping record, showing the rifle was ordered by and shipped to "A. Hidell" at post office box 2915 in Dallas, Texas. That box had been rented under the name of Lee H. Oswald. Oswald was carrying two forged identification cards with the name "Alek James Hidell" in his wallet at the time of his arrest.

The handwriting on the order coupon matched that of Oswald's when compared to his passport application and letters he had written. The Italian Armed Forces Intelligence Agency (SIFAR) reported that the rifle with the serial number of C2766 was unique in its records.

In 1979, photographic analysis by the House Select Committee on Assassinations found that the rifle in the National Archives was photographically identical, in a number of distinctive marks, to the one found in the book depository and photographed at the time by numerous journalists and the police. The rifle was also identical in its dimensions to the one seen in the Oswald backyard photos, and both had the same damage mark on the stock.

== Revolver ==
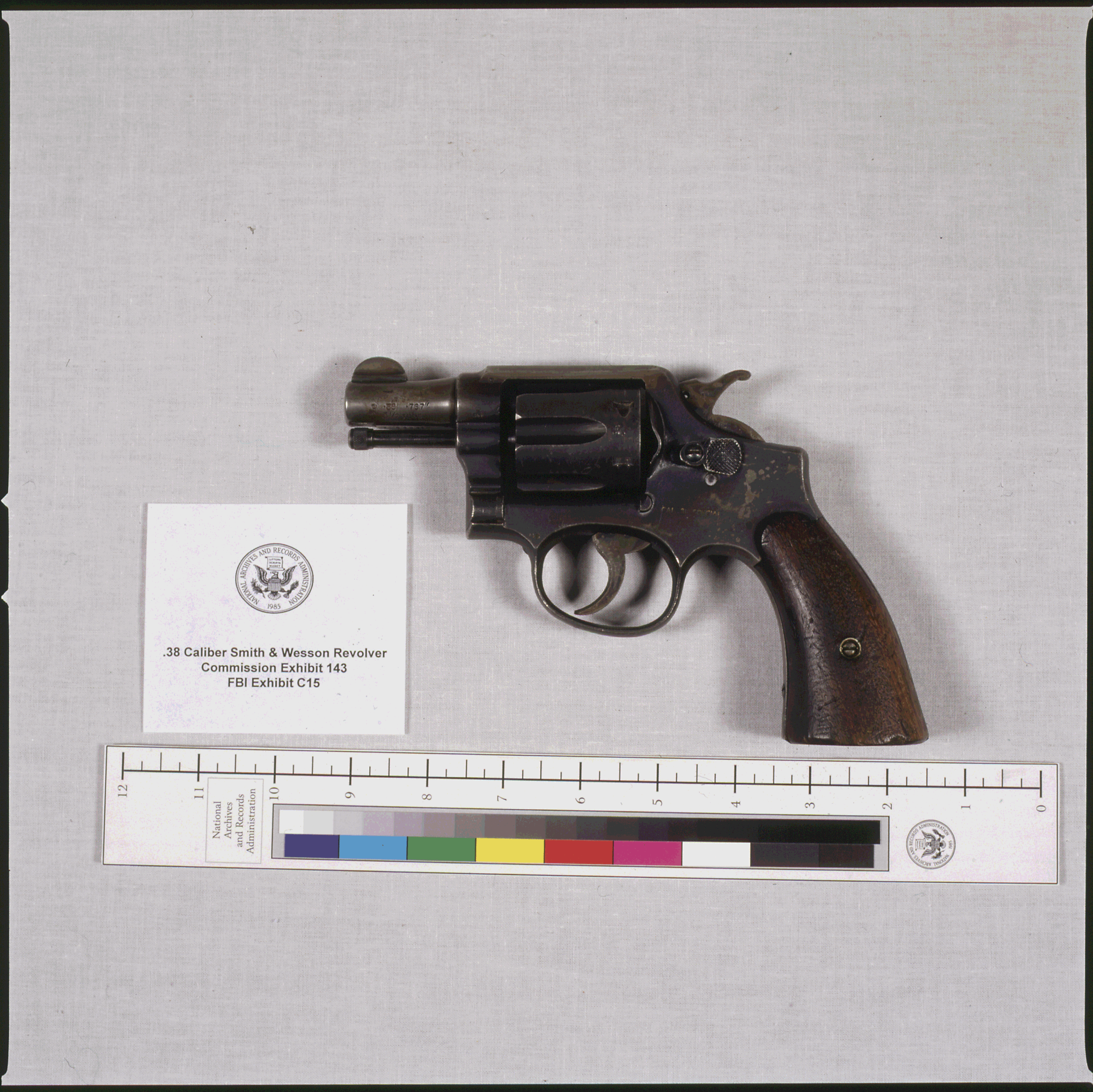
The revolver Oswald was carrying at the time of his arrest

The snub-nosed Smith & Wesson "Victory" Model .38 Special revolver, serial number V510210, which Oswald had in his hand when he was arrested in the Texas Theatre eighty minutes after the assassination, was identified by model and serial number as the one purchased by mail order using the same P.O. Box as the rifle, and also by an "A.J. Hidell", with handwriting that matched Oswald's (the pistol, however, was not shipped to this P.O. box, but to a freight outlet with a notice going to the box, as Texas law required a check of age for pistol buyers which the post office could not do). The Warren Commission concluded that Oswald used the revolver to murder Dallas police officer J. D. Tippit about forty-five minutes after the assassination when Tippit stopped Oswald on a residential street.

== Shirt ==
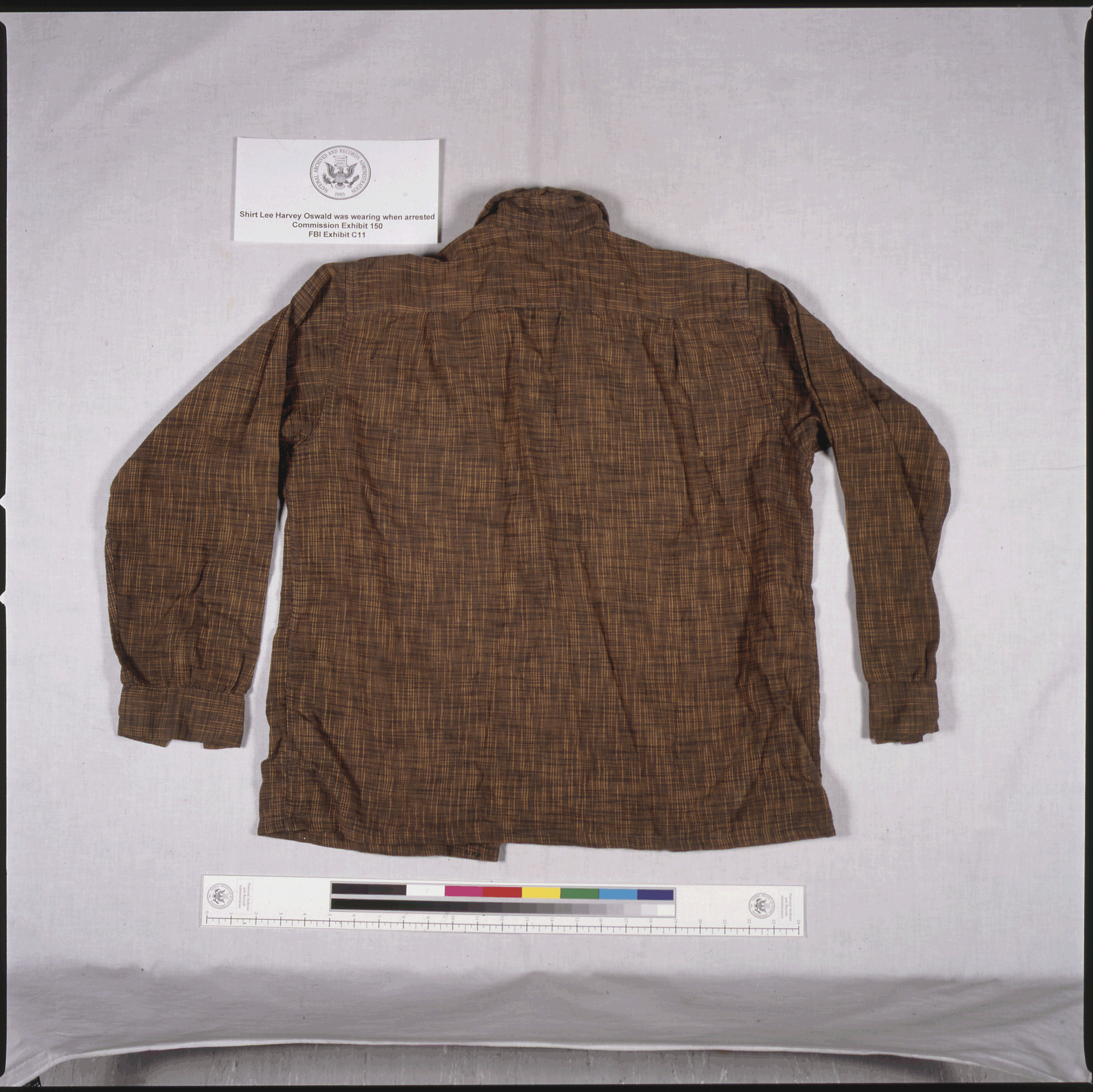
The shirt that Oswald was wearing at the time of his arrest

In the crevice between the butt-plate and the wooden stock of the Carcano rifle recovered from the Texas School Book Depository, a tuft of several cotton fibers of dark blue, grey-black and orange-yellow shades were found.

Upon his capture in a theater less than two hours after Kennedy was killed, Oswald was wearing a brown shirt composed of dark blue, grey-black and orange-yellow cotton fibers over a white T-shirt, the same type of fibers that were recovered from the rifle after close examination by experts.

After tests of the colors, shades, and weave patterns of the fibers found on the gun, Paul Stombaugh, a special agent of the FBI Laboratory's Hair and Fiber Unit, matched the fibers found on the gun to the fibers from Oswald's shirt design.

== Firing range ==
During his Marine Corps service in December 1956, Oswald scored a rating of sharpshooter (twice achieving 48 and 49 out of 50 shots during rapid fire at a stationary target 200 yards [183 m] away using a standard issue M1 Garand semi-automatic rifle), although in May 1959, he qualified as a marksman (a lower classification than that of sharpshooter). Military experts, after examining his records, characterized his firearms proficiency as "above average" and said he was, when compared to American civilian males of his age, "an excellent shot".

However, Nelson Delgado, a Marine in the same unit as Oswald, used to laugh at Oswald's shooting prowess and testified that Oswald often got "Maggie's drawers"; meaning a red flag that is waved from the rifle pits to indicate a complete miss of the target during qualification firing. He also said that Oswald did not seem to care if he missed or not. Delgado was first stationed with Oswald in Santa Ana, California, at the beginning of 1958, meeting him for the first time there and a little more than a year after Oswald first made sharpshooter.

Skeptics have argued that expert marksmen could not duplicate Oswald's shooting in their first try during re-enactments by the Warren Commission (1964) and CBS (1967). In those tests, the marksmen attempted to hit the target three times within 5.6 seconds. This time span has been heavily disputed. The Warren Commission itself estimated that the time span between the two shots that hit President Kennedy was 4.8 to 5.6 seconds. If the second shot missed (assuming the first and third shots hit the president), then 4.8 to 5.6 seconds was the total time span of the shots. If the first or third shot missed, that would give a minimum time of 7.1 to 7.9 seconds for the three shots. Modern analysis of a digitally enhanced Zapruder film suggests that the first, second, and final shot may have taken 8.3 seconds.

== CBS firing test in 1967 ==
For the test, 11 marksmen from diverse backgrounds were invited to participate: 3 Maryland State Troopers, 1 weapons engineer, 1 sporting goods dealer, 1 sportsman, 1 ballistics technician, 1 ex-paratrooper, and 3 H. P. White employees. CBS provided several Carcano rifles for the test. Oswald's rifle was not used in this test. The targets were color-coded orange for head/shoulder silhouette and blue for a near miss. The results of the CBS test were as follows: 7 of 11 shooters were able to fire three rounds under 5.6 seconds (64%). Of those 7 shooters, 6 hit the orange target once (86%), and 5 hit the orange target twice (71%). Out of 60 rounds fired, 25 hit the orange (42%), 21 hit the blue portion of the target (35%), and there were 14 misses on the target (23%).

One volunteer was unable to operate his rifle effectively, so the following statistics are based on the 10 remaining shooters. The mean time of all 10 shooters was 5.64 seconds, with a mode of 5.55 seconds. The mean times for the top five and bottom five shooters were 5.12 seconds and 6.16 seconds, respectively. There was a high occurrence of jamming during the test. On average, the rifles jammed after 6 rounds. The most rounds fired without jamming were 14, 11, 10 in a row. The least was 0 (back to back).

The first shooter to lead off the experiment was Al Sherman, Maryland State Trooper. The record of his effort: 5.0 sec: 2 orange, 1 blue / 6.0 sec: 2 orange, 1 blue / NT (jam at 3rd cartridge)/ 5.2 sec: 1 orange, 2 low / 5.0 sec: 1 orange, 2 blue. Sherman was able to fire 8 rounds before his rifle jammed. Of all the shooters, the fastest times were: 4.1 sec, 4.3 sec, 4.9 sec, 5.0 sec. The best accuracy was 3 orange in 5.2 seconds. The rifles were oiled and allowed to cool down between shooters. CBS reporter Dan Rather attended this experiment.

== FBI tests ==
The FBI tests of the Carcano's accuracy showed:

1) FBI firearms expert Robert A. Frazier testified that "It is a very accurate weapon. The targets we fired show that." From 15 yards (14 m), all three bullets in a test firing landed approximately 2 1/2 inches (64 mm) high, and 1-inch (25 mm) to the right, in the area about the size of a dime (0.705 inch diameter). At 100 yards (91 m), the test shots landed 2 1/2 to 5 inches (64 to 127 mm) high, within a 3-to-5-inch (76 to 127 mm) circle. Frazier testified that the scope's high variation would actually work in the shooter's favor: with a target moving away from the shooter, no lead correction would have been necessary to follow the target. "At that range, at that distance, 175 to 265 feet [53 to 81 m], with this rifle and that telescopic sight, I would not have allowed any lead – I would not have made any correction for lead merely to hit a target of that size."

2) The rifle couldn't be perfectly sighted using the scope (i.e., thereby eliminating the above overshoot completely) without installing two metal shims (small metal plates), which were not present when the rifle arrived for testing, and were never found. Frazier testified that there was "a rather severe scrape" on the scope tube, and that the sight could have been bent or damaged. He was unable to determine when the defect occurred before the FBI received the rifle and scope on November 27, 1963.

== Ballistics Research Laboratory tests ==
In an effort to test the rifle under conditions that matched the assassination, the Infantry Weapons Evaluation Branch of the U.S. Army's Ballistics Research Laboratory had expert riflemen fire the assassination weapon from a tower at three silhouette targets at distances of 175, 240 and 265 feet (53, 73 and 81 m). Using the assassination rifle mounted with the telescopic sight, three marksmen, rated as master by the National Rifle Association, each fired two series of three shots. In the first series, the firers required time spans of 4.6, 6.75, and 8.25 seconds respectively. On the second series, they required 5.15, 6.45, and 7 seconds. The marksmen took as much time as they wanted for the first target at 175 feet (53 m), and all hit the target. For the first four attempts, the firers missed the second shot at 240 feet (73 m) by several inches. Five of the six shots hit the third target at 265 feet (81 m), the distance of President Kennedy from the sixth floor window when he was struck in the head. None of the marksmen had any practice with the assassination weapon beforehand except to work the bolt.

During the investigation by the House Select Committee on Assassinations (1976–1978), the lead attorneys for the Committee, Robert Blakey and Gary Cornwell, were allowed to use WC-139 at an FBI firing range. The attorneys wanted to see how fast the bolt action could be operated. Blakey was able to fire two rounds in 1.5 seconds and Cornwell fired two rounds in 1.2 seconds. This was an experiment to test a possible theory that Oswald in his excitement may have pointed and fired, as opposed to aimed and fired. Some critics of the Warren Commission had claimed it was impossible to fire a Carcano rifle in less than 2.3 seconds. Both the CBS and HSCA tests proved conclusively that the claim was not accurate.

== Other research ==
In 1972, the Kennedy family chose John K. Lattimer, MD, as the first nongovernmental expert to examine evidence taken at Kennedy's autopsy. Lattimer performed ballistic tests and other research to prove that Lee Harvey Oswald was likely the sniper who shot and killed President John F. Kennedy from the Texas School Book Depository in Dallas. Dr. Lattimer frequently performed a demonstration of Oswald's shooting, firing three well-aimed shots within 8.3 seconds with Carcano M91/38 and under the same firing conditions. By doing so Dr. Lattimer intended to prove that Oswald could have performed such a feat. He continued to perform this demonstration well into his late 80s. Lattimer owned Oswald's Marine shooting record which he said showed that Oswald was an excellent shot. In 1980, Dr. Lattimer wrote a book: Kennedy and Lincoln: Medical & Ballistic Comparisons of Their Assassinations in which he did an investigation of both the Lincoln and the Kennedy assassinations, and supported the findings of the Warren Commission. In his book, Lattimer theorized that President Kennedy's arms exhibited the "Thorburn Position" with elbows extended and arms folded inward, as a neurological reaction to the bullet wound to his spine.

Vincent Bugliosi put forward the hypothesis that Oswald aimed the Carcano with the open sights, which reduced the time necessary to take the three shots postulated by the Warren Commission. He notes that, with the downward slope on Dealey Plaza, President Kennedy's head would have appeared to Oswald to be a stationary target as the vehicle moved down and away at a slow speed. This suggestion also therefore makes any claim that the scope was defective to be meaningless with respect to Oswald's shooting ability. However, with the M91/38 open sights being factory set to be accurate at 200 meters, the final shot being well under 100 meters and the M91/38 not being a very flat shooting rifle to begin with (up to ten inches [25 cm] high at 100 meters), this rifle would have been shooting quite high and would have made hitting Kennedy extremely difficult. This would have been further exacerbated by the steep downward angle from the sixth floor of the Depository building to the limo, which would have made the shot go even higher than what Oswald would have been aiming at.

In 2008, the Discovery Channel produced a documentary that played out several different versions of the Kennedy assassination on a dummy that had been specifically designed for ballistics tests, recreating the elevation, wind speed and distance at a California shooting range. Their forensic analysis, backed by computer models, showed that it was most likely that the shot that killed President Kennedy came from the Texas School Book Depository. They also concluded that a shot from the grassy knoll would have obliterated Kennedy's skull, contrary to what is seen in the Zapruder film. However, in this conclusion they assumed that an assassin on the grassy knoll would have used hollow point ammunition, which expands on impact to maximize damage. Thereafter, they attempted a second shot from the grassy knoll position, using a solid round. Analysis revealed that this bullet would have passed through Kennedy's skull from right to left, causing an exit wound on the left-hand side of the skull that did not match any postmortem reports. They also suggested that the bullet trajectory from this shot would have struck and likely killed Mrs. Kennedy.

== Later history ==
The rifle remained in the possession of the FBI from November 1963 to November 1966, except for brief periods in 1964 when it was loaned to the Warren Commission and tested by the U.S. Army's Weapons Evaluation Branch. Likewise, the pistol was held by the FBI from November 1963 to November 1966, except for a brief period in 1964 when it was loaned to the Warren Commission.

In December 1964, Lee Oswald's widow, Marina, sold whatever right, interest, or title that she had in the rifle and pistol for $5,000; and in March 1965 she sold whatever power of sale she had in them for an additional $5,000. A $35,000 additional payment to Marina Oswald was contingent upon the buyer obtaining possession "free and clear of all adverse claims".

The buyer, Denver oilman and gun collector John J. King, commenced an action in federal court in May 1965 for the recovery of the weapons from possession of the U.S. government. In response, the Alcohol and Tobacco Tax Division of the Internal Revenue Service began an in rem forfeiture proceeding against the rifle and the pistol. The U.S. District Court held that Oswald had used fictitious names when purchasing the weapons, in violation of the Federal Firearms Act of 1938, which allowed for immediate seizure and forfeiture of any such illegally obtained weapons.

The lower court's decision was reversed on appeal in July 1966, with the appellate court holding that "There is no provision in the Federal Firearms Act requiring a purchaser to use his true name when ordering weapons from a dealer licensed under the Act", and that the government would have to acquire title to the weapons by condemnation. Thereafter, in November 1966, the U.S. Attorney General, acting under the authority provided by Public Law 89-318, published his determination that the various items considered by the Warren Commission, including the weapons which were the subject of the forfeiture proceeding, should be acquired by the United States. Upon the publication of the Attorney General's determination, "all rights, title, and interest in and to" the weapons "shall be vested in the United States".

The buyer sued the U.S. government for damages of $5 million for the taking of the weapons, but his claim was rejected by the court, which set the case for trial, and wrote:

The demand of plaintiff for $5,000,000 is on its face inequitable — in fact unconscionable — and would appear to be based on some projected market value which could only arise from the fact that these are curiosities which derive their character as such from the assassination and which can be exhibited on a profit basis. But the uniqueness of the items in question, in our opinion, precludes reception of evidence of market value. We can see no demonstrable market for these particular objects.

King's claim was heard at trial in federal court in 1969, where a twelve-person jury agreed with the government's contention that Lee Oswald had abandoned the rifle in 1963, therefore Marina Oswald had no claim to it or a right of sale. King received no compensation for the rifle's taking by the federal government, although he did receive $350 in compensation for the government's taking of the pistol found on Oswald at his arrest, which King had also purchased from Marina Oswald.

The rifle is listed in the online inventory of the National Archives and Records Administration Building in College Park, Maryland. The Sixth Floor Museum in Dallas has a duplicate rifle on display.
