= Fabbrica Nazionale d'Armi =

Italian firearm manufacturer (1929–1957)

- Type: Societa anonima
- Industry: Small arms
- Predecessor: Fabbrica d'Armi Pietro Lorenzotti
- Founded: 1929
- Founders: Giacinto Mazzola
- Defunct: 1957
- Headquarters: Brescia, Italy
- Number of employees: 3,000 (1940)

Fabbrica Nazionale d'Armi (FNA) (Italian: Fabbrica Nazionale d'Armi, lit. 'National Arms Factory') was an Italian small arms manufacturer founded in Brescia on November 12 1929.

Following World War II, the firm continued arms manufacturing and attempted to enter civilian industries. But it would sell its assets in 1956 and dissolve in 1957.

== History ==
=== Founding and growth ===
FNA was founded in Brescia on November 12 1929 by the board of directors of Fabbrica d'Armi Pietro Lorenzotti. Since 1927, sales of their hunting shotguns had declined due to economic downturn. Pietro Lorenzotti would subsequently sell his factory to Giacinto Mazzola. The Lorenzotti name would continue being used for commercial guns while Mazzola focused on obtaining Italian military contracts for FNA.

Its first military contract arrived in September 1929. The conversion of 10,500 Carcano long rifles to the Truppe Speciali carbine pattern for the Regia Marina. The contract was completed by 1931, with the guns receiving Pietro Lorenzotti branding despite the establishment of FNA.

Further contracts for Carcano production with the Regia Marina and the Regio Esercito continued throughout the early 1930s. FNA expanded from its original factory on Via Vantini by acquiring the former MIDA factory on Via Apollonio.

FNA was initially given the exclusive rights to produce scaled-down Carcano moschetto carbines for the Opera Nazionale Balilla. Though many other companies would proceed to create these Carcano toys throughout the 1930s.

=== World War II ===
An FNA-produced Type I rifle, indicated by the logo on the bolt handle

During the Second Sino-Japanese War, Italian arms manufacturers were contracted to produce Type I rifles for Imperial Japan. From 1938 to 1939, FNA would produce 30,000 rifles for this order alongside Beretta and the state arsenal at Gardone Val Trompia.

During WWII, FNA would primarily manufacture moschetto and M38 pattern Carcanos. As well as components for Breda 30 light machine guns and barrels for Beretta M1934 and M1935 pistols. FNA would also manufacture samples of the experimental 20-round Sosso pistol in 1941. They may have also produced the model 1938 and 1941 Pavesi semi-automatic rifles for Italian military trials. (Note: Riccio claims that the Pavesi rifles were built by either FNA or Meccanica Bresciana Tempini (MBT), another Brescia-based weapons manufacturer)

Following Operation Achse in September 1943, the Wehrmacht, occupied its facilities to continue production of Carcanos, in addition to 2,084 Breda 30 machine guns. As well as the new FNAB-43 submachine gun which had been designed by Cremona's Armaguerra. It also contributed towards the conversion of Carcanos from 6.5×52mm Carcano to 7.92×57mm Mauser. The city of Brescia would be liberated In April 1945.

=== Postwar ===
In 1947, the factory fell under control of Italy's Finanziamento Industrie Manufacturare organizational body, and produced machinery for Officine Meccaniche. From 1950 to 1954, it would manufacture about 25,000 Carcano M38s for export to Egypt alongside Franchi.

FNA's last original firearm projects were the X4 and X5 submachine guns developed in the 1950s. They failed to secure any contracts, and only samples were manufactured. One of these would reach the Algerian FLN before being confiscated by French authorities.

Attempts to reorient its business towards agricultural equipment and precision instruments proved fruitless. In April 1956, it was sold to a conglomerate of Breda, Beretta, and Hispano Suiza. FNA would be formally dissolved in September 1957.

== Bibliography ==
- M. Zane, S. Soggetti - Val Trompia. I luoghi e le industrie nel Novecento - Fondazione Negri - 2013
- M. Signorini - Breve storia delle armi Bresciane - Walmar - 2008
