= Type I rifle =

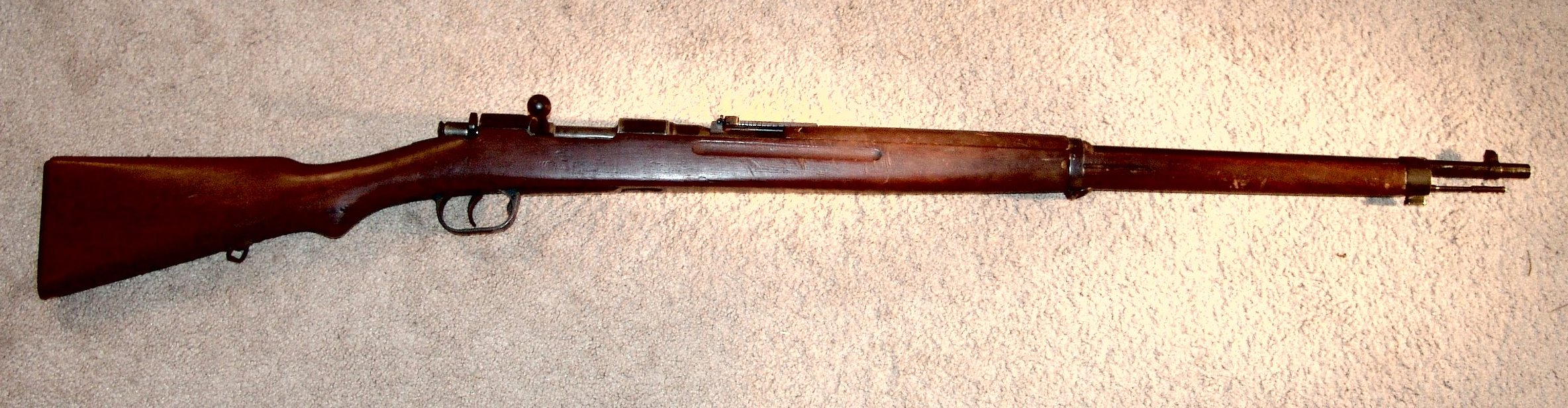
- Type: Bolt-action rifle
- Place of origin: Japan/Italy

Service history
- In service: 1938–1945
- Used by: See Users
- Wars: World War II

Production history
- Designer: Fabbrica d'Armi Terni
- Designed: 1938
- Manufacturer: Beretta; Fabbrica Nazionale d'Armi; Sezione Fabbrica d'Armi Regio Esercito
- Produced: 1938–1939
- No. built: 120,000

Specifications
- Mass: 3.95 kg (8 lb 11 oz)
- Length: 1,285 mm (50.6 in)
- Barrel length: 797 mm (31.4 in)
- Cartridge: 6.5×50mmSR Arisaka
- Action: Bolt action
- Muzzle velocity: 765 m/s (2,510 ft/s)
- Maximum firing range: 2,400 m (1.5 mi)
- Feed system: 5-round internal box magazine, loaded with 5-round stripper clips
- Sights: Open sights

The Type I rifle (Japanese: イ式小銃, Hepburn: I-shiki shōjū) was produced during the early years of World War II for the Empire of Japan by Fascist Italy (Type I is not a numeric symbol, it denominates Italian (イタリア語, Itaria-go)).

== Design ==
It was based on the Type 38 rifle and utilized a Carcano action, with a modification to the placement of the ejector groove: unlike the original design, the groove is centered in the receiver, not in the offset. It also retained the Arisaka/Mauser type 5-round box magazine, which resembled the one used in the Type 38 rifle, rather than Carcano's Mannlicher-style, en-bloc clip-fed magazine. It was chambered for the 6.5 x 50 mm cartridge. Additionaly, the rear of the action featured a stripper clip guide. The heel of the buttstock was joined to the rest of the stock using the Japanese method of splicing. This was done to conserve wood and ensure the proper alignment of the wood grain in the toe of the stock, helping to prevent cracking and chipping. As this technique was unusual for Italian manufacturing methods, it is presumed that such construction was requested by the Japanese. The front nosepiece and barrel diameter were designed to allow usage of the Type 30 bayonet.

== History ==
After the Second Sino-Japanese War began, Japan's domestic rifle production could not keep pace with wartime demands. Local production was able to supply firearms to Imperial Japanese Army, but not to the Imperial Japanese Navy. This necessitated the purchase of foreign rifles such as the Karabiner 98k and Vz. 24.

In December 1937 Arisue Seizo, Italy-based military attaché of the Japanese Defence Ministry, offered the Italian government a contract for 130,000 rifles, officially meant for the "Manchukuo Government for Training purposes". Order amount was then lowered; Japan initially ordered 60,000 Type I rifles from the Terni arsenal, but ultimately approximately 120,000 of those were produced in 1938 and 1939, with 30,000 each manufactured by Beretta and Fabbrica Nazionale d'Armi, and 60,000 manufactured by the state arsenal in Gardone Val Trompia. The manufacturer of each rifle can be identified by its serial number: prefixes A through F were assigned to Gardone Val Trompia, G through I to FNA Brescia, and J through L to Beretta. Each letter is followed by a number ranging from 1 to 9,999. These serial numbers provide evidence of the actual number of rifles manufactured, contradicting official documents, which consistently state that only 60,000 rifles were ordered. The final shipment reached Japan on 28 December 1939. Japan paid 9.6 million yen or 50 million liras. Since it was less than 10 million yen allocated by Japanese for this order, saved founds were spend on the German anti-aircraft ammunition.

The Imperial Japanese Navy was the primary user of the Type I. While typically used for training to free up more Type 38 rifles for frontline usage, they would periodically be fielded by the Special Naval Landing Forces. Some rifles were given to Japan's puppet regimes in China and used by garrison units of the Imperial Japanese Army until the conclusion of hostilities.

=== On the collector market ===
On the collector market in the United States, the Type I rifle is uncommon and not particularly popular among collectors. Since the heritage of the Type I rifle is both Japanese and Italian, it tends to be shunned by collectors of Japanese focus. The Type I never had the Japanese Imperial Chrysanthemum markings, or other markings that typically interest collectors of Japanese militaria. Many Type I rifles brought back to the United States as war trophies were reportedly captured at Kwajalein Atoll, the Philippines, or from Japan at the conclusion of hostilities. On the collector market, it is known as "Carcano-Arisaka", "Italian Arisaka" or "Japanese Carcano".

== Users ==
- Japan: Used by Imperial Japanese Navy in addition to rear line units of the Imperial Japanese Army.
- Reorganized National Government of the Republic of China: At least 2,000 sent to Collaborationist Chinese Army.
- Mengjiang: 1,000 sent to Mengjiang National Army in March 1940.

== See also ==
- Type 38 rifle
- Chiang Kai-shek rifle
- Mosin–Nagant
- Karabinek wz. 1929
- Karabiner 98k
- MAS-36 rifle
- Mannlicher M1895
