= M1870 Italian Vetterli =

Vetterli Model 1870
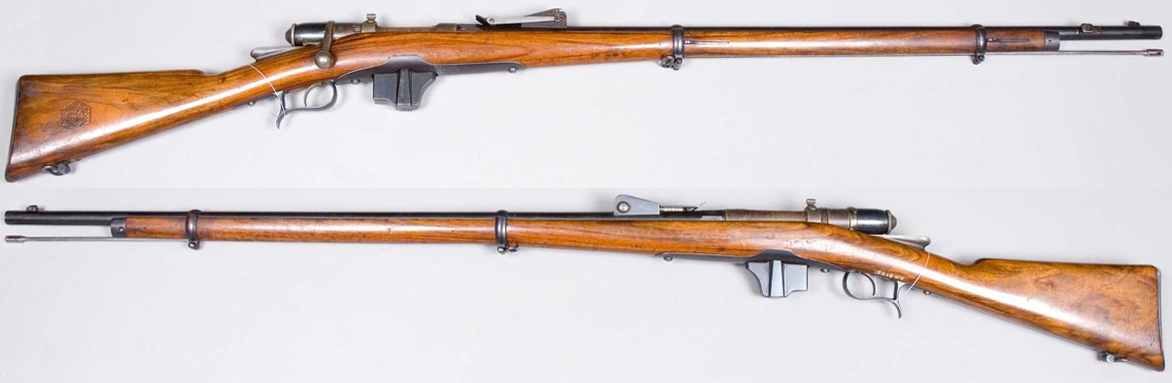
- Vetterli-Vitali rifle M1870/87
- Type: Bolt-action rifle
- Place of origin: Switzerland

Service history
- In service: 1871–1950s
- Used by: See Users
- Wars: Mahdist War; Macedonian Struggle; First Italo-Ethiopian War; Boxer Rebellion; Irish revolutionary period World War I Russian Civil War; Turkish Revolution; Second Italo-Ethiopian War; Chaco War; Spanish Civil War; World War II

Production history
- No. built: 1,500,000
- Variants: M1870/87 and M1870/87/15

Specifications
- Mass: M1870/87: 10.19 lb (4.62 kg); M1870/87/15: 10.19 lb (4.62 kg)
- Length: 52.95 in (134.5 cm)
- Barrel length: 33.85 in (86.0 cm)
- Cartridge: M1870/87: 10.4×47mmR; M1870/87/15: 6.5×52mm Carcano
- Action: Bolt-action
- Muzzle velocity: M1870/87: 1,410 ft/s (430 m/s); M1870/87/15: 2,395 ft/s (730 m/s)
- Effective firing range: M1870/87: 2,000 m (2,200 yd); M1870/87/15: 2,000 m (2,200 yd)
- Feed system: M1870: single shot M1870/87: 4 round magazine M1870/87/15: 6 round magazine

The M1870 Vetterli was the Italian military's service rifle from 1870 to 1891. In 1887, it would be modified into the repeating M1870/87 Italian Vetterli-Vitali variant. The Vetterli rifle used the 10.4mm Vetterli centrefire cartridge, at first loaded with black powder and later with smokeless powder. Some Vetterli rifles would later be converted into 6.5×52mm Carcano during World War I. Despite being supplanted by the Carcano rifle, it continued to see use in Italian service and abroad.

== Development ==
In the aftermath of the Risorgimento, the Italian Army's service rifles were muzzleloaders converted to needle rifles through a method developed by Salvatore Carcano. From 1869 to 1870, four infantry regiments and five Bersaglieri battalions trialed various bolt-action designs which used metallic cartridges. Among these was the Swiss Vetterli M1868, which the Italian government ultimately selected. However, the decision was made to make the rifles single-shot instead of retaining the tubular magazine of the original design. Some experimental examples were created by SIG before production began in Italy.

== M1870 ==
Italian state arsenals began producing the Vetterli from 1871. Rifles with varying differences were produced until the design was standardized in 1874. Five versions of the single-shot Vetterli were produced. The first of these were the infantry rifle and the cavalry carbine. A short rifle for special troops was introduced at some point before 1875. In the 1880s, variants of the carbine would be specially made for the Carabinieri and Corazzieri. In 1881, the rear sight would be replaced with the Vecchi sight.

== M1870/82 ==
In 1882, the Italian Navy adopted the Vetterli-Bertoldo, a tube magazine conversion.

== M1870/87 ==
From 1887 until 1896, the Italian Army converted M1870s into a four-shot repeating rifle, based on the system designed by Italian artillery captain, G. Vitali. This conversion added a box magazine fed from a steel and wood charger holding four cartridges, in the same caliber (10.4x47R mm) as before. The clip is pressed into the magazine, until the last round catches under the Cartridge retainer, and then the clip is withdrawn using the "pull string" in the top wooden frame of the clip. Clips of cartridges were supplied in a soldered sheet steel box, holding six clips. In 1890, the rear sight would again be modified to account for the smokeless version of the 10.4mm ammunition.

The conversion to the Vitali magazine was done on the long rifle, the TS (special troops musketoon) and possibly some of the Carabinieri carbines; No Vitali conversions were done to the Moschetto da Cavalleria for metropolitan Italian troops. In 1888, the Fondo Coloniale (Eritrea) requested 500 Vitali-converted Vetterli cavalry carbines for the Eritrean Native Cavalry ("spahi"—Swahili for "horse-soldier"). There are currently five known examples still in existence (one in Australia, two in the US, two in Italy). Collectors refer to it as the M1870/88 V.V.Eritrean cav carbine. The Regio Esercito (Royal Army) Cavalry units maintained the M1870 single shot Moschetto da cavalleria until replaced by the M1891 Moschetto da cavalleria in 1893.

The conversion is indicted by a cartouche "Artig. Fab. D'armi Terni 1888" (dates vary), on the butt stock. The center of the cartouche displays a Crest of Savoy and the word, Riparazione (Italian for repair) is directly below the cartouche. Shortages of small arms appeared from the very beginning of Italy's entrance into World War I on the side of the Allies.

During the Home Rule Crisis, Frederick H. Crawford arranged the Larne gun-running operation. The Ulster Volunteer Force would acquire thousands of M1870/87 rifles from German arms dealers. The Irish Volunteers also acquired Vetterli rifles from similar German sources, albeit in much smaller numbers. By the 1920s, many of these Vetterlis had been brought to Britain. They would later furnish Officers' Training Corps to free up Lee-Enfield rifles during WWII, most notably at Shrewsbury School's OTC.

As more of the population mobilized for the first total war in European history, the supply of modern small arms fell short before the end of 1915 and a large number of obsolete Modello 1870/87 Vetterli-Vitali rifles were issued to support units and to newly formed regiments that were not expected to be in combat, however, troops carried these antiquated rifles into battle on several occasions, especially Artillery crews.

As well, in 1916, Italy sent 400,000 Vetterli-Vitali rifles to Russia, as well as ammunition and components, which was facilitated by Britain. These "tsarist" rifles eventually ended up in Republican hands in the Spanish Civil War, as the Soviet Union emptied its depots of all the old black powder and early smokeless rifles it had inherited after the Bolshevik Revolution of 1917.

== M1870/87/15 ==
Going into World War I, Italy had about 1,316,000 M1870/87 rifles in their inventories, of which 500,000 got sold (but not withdrawn) to a private firm, Zumino & Rossetti. These 500,000 guns are the upstated M70/87 rifles sent to Russia; the other 816,000 left behind in Italy got converted to share the same 6.5mm round as the primary service rifle, the M1891 Carcano, by adding a 6.5mm barrel lining and a modified M91 Carcano magazine.

This conversion, formally adopted as Fucile Mod. 70/87/1916 (M1870/87/15 is used mostly in contemporary sources) was first proposed by the Beretta company, on the eve of Italy's entry into war, in May 1915. The Beretta proposal got initially refused by the Italian Army because it required to produce brand new barrels, at a prohibitive cost for a third line gun in a war economy. So the Terni arsenal' Chief Technician Giuseppe Salerno, specialised in Barrel making, proposed to use his patent for barrel sleeving in order to convert the old 10.4 diameter barrels into 6.5. This barrel sleeving was hence called the "Salerno method", and consisted in drilling the old barrel with some steps along it, inserting a brand new tubular sleeve with matching steps, and pressure fitting it to the old barrel. The bolt face was also machined to accept the smaller diameter 6.5 mm cartridge head, and the firing pin shortened.

The First completed guns got delivered in July 1916, destined to the Territorial Militia units of the 1st, 4th and Carnia Armies. Every batch of 6.5 vetterli delivered got swapped with the old 10.4 Vetterli previously issued to that unit, in order to keep the conversion circle going. In total, about 700,000 Vetterli rifles got converted to 6.5, almost entirely by the Rome Arsenal, although barrels were probably converted in Terni as well.

These converted rifles were used by rear echelon troops (Artillery crews, Territorial militias, guards, fortress units, training, etc.) and were rarely fired, although photographic evidence of its use on active battlefields exists.

After WWI, many of these rifles were assigned to Italy's colonial units. These rifles were used in the Second Italo-Ethiopian War and World War II, mostly by native African soldiers. This version would also be used by the Nationalist faction during the Spanish Civil War, as war aid offered by the Italian fascist government. During World War II, they were used by some fascist Blackshirts paramilitaries and some Partisan units.

== Users ==
- Albania: Supplied by Italy along with Carcano rifles during the Interwar period.
- Republic of China (1912–1949): At least 143,000 purchased between 1919 and 1924 during the Warlord Era. Predominately by Cao Kun and Wu Peifu.
- Ethiopian Empire: In 1884, 5,000 were sent to Menelik II. After the Italian defeat at the Battle of Adwa, at least 9,000 extra were captured. These would later be used by irregular forces in the 1930s resisting the second Italian invasion.
- Kingdom of Italy: Service rifle until the adoption of the Carcano.
- Italian Republic: Still used by station masters in rural areas by the 1950s.
- Paraguay: Purchased surplus M1870/87/15 rifles during the Chaco War.
- Kingdom of Romania: From 1917, 123.000 rifles purchased from Italy.
- Russian Empire: From 1915, approximately 400,000 M1870/87 rifles purchased with 31 million rounds of 10.35mm.
- Spanish Republic: Supplied by the USSR during the Civil War.
- Spanish State: Used M1870/87/15 rifles supplied by Fascist Italy.
- United Kingdom: Some 1870/87 rifles were confiscated from the Ulster Defence Force and later issued to the Home Guard

=== Non-state actors ===
- Hellenic Macedonian Committee: Unknown number in use by 1905. Ioannis Ramnalis was photographed with an M1870 carbine in hand.
- Makhnovshchina: Supplied 3,000 rifles and 100,000 rounds of 10.35mm by the Bolsheviks in 1919.
- Irish Volunteers: Approximately 1,000 purchased.
- Ulster Volunteers: Acquired 7,000 by 1917.
- Appalachian Miners' Union Forces: Photos taken between in West Virginia during the Paint Creek Strike of 1912 and following the defeat of United Mineworker forces at Blair Mountain in 1921 show Vetterli 1870/87 rifles in piles of weapons captured by the National Guard. Like most non-standard weapons used, it appears to have been sporadic due to the lack of archaeological evidence of expended cartridges.

== Comparison with contemporary rifles ==
Comparison of 1880s rifles
Calibre	System	Country	Velocity					Height of trajectory				Ammunition	
Calibre	System	Country	Muzzle	500 yd (460 m)	1,000 yd (910 m)	1,500 yd (1,400 m)	2,000 yd (1,800 m)	500 yd (460 m)	1,000 yd (910 m)	1,500 yd (1,400 m)	2,000 yd (1,800 m)	Propellant	Bullet
.433 in (11.0 mm)	Werndl–Holub rifle	Austria-Hungary	1,439 ft/s (439 m/s)	854 ft/s (260 m/s)	620 ft/s (190 m/s)	449 ft/s (137 m/s)	328 ft/s (100 m/s)	8.252 ft (2.515 m)	49.41 ft (15.06 m)	162.6 ft (49.6 m)	426.0 ft (129.8 m)	77 gr (5.0 g)	370 gr (24 g)
.45 in (11.43 mm)	Martini–Henry	United Kingdom	1,315 ft/s (401 m/s)	869 ft/s (265 m/s)	664 ft/s (202 m/s)	508 ft/s (155 m/s)	389 ft/s (119 m/s)	9.594 ft (2.924 m)	47.90 ft (14.60 m)	147.1 ft (44.8 m)	357.85 ft (109.07 m)	85 gr (5.5 g)	480 gr (31 g)
.433 in (11.0 mm)	Fusil Gras mle 1874	France	1,489 ft/s (454 m/s)	878 ft/s (268 m/s)	643 ft/s (196 m/s)	471 ft/s (144 m/s)	348 ft/s (106 m/s)	7.769 ft (2.368 m)	46.6 ft (14.2 m)	151.8 ft (46.3 m)	389.9 ft (118.8 m)	80 gr (5.2 g)	386 gr (25.0 g)
.433 in (11.0 mm)	Mauser Model 1871	Germany	1,430 ft/s (440 m/s)	859 ft/s (262 m/s)	629 ft/s (192 m/s)	459 ft/s (140 m/s)	388 ft/s (118 m/s)	8.249 ft (2.514 m)	48.68 ft (14.84 m)	159.2 ft (48.5 m)	411.1 ft (125.3 m)	75 gr (4.9 g)	380 gr (25 g)
.408 in (10.4 mm)	M1870 Italian Vetterli	Italy	1,430 ft/s (440 m/s)	835 ft/s (255 m/s)	595 ft/s (181 m/s)	422 ft/s (129 m/s)	304 ft/s (93 m/s)	8.527 ft (2.599 m)	52.17 ft (15.90 m)	176.3 ft (53.7 m)	469.9 ft (143.2 m)	62 gr (4.0 g)	310 gr (20 g)
.397 in (10.08 mm)	Jarmann M1884	Norway and Sweden	1,536 ft/s (468 m/s)	908 ft/s (277 m/s)	675 ft/s (206 m/s)	504 ft/s (154 m/s)	377 ft/s (115 m/s)	7.235 ft (2.205 m)	42.97 ft (13.10 m)	137.6 ft (41.9 m)	348.5 ft (106.2 m)	77 gr (5.0 g)	337 gr (21.8 g)
.42 in (10.67 mm)	Berdan rifle	Russia	1,444 ft/s (440 m/s)	873 ft/s (266 m/s)	645 ft/s (197 m/s)	476 ft/s (145 m/s)	353 ft/s (108 m/s)	7.995 ft (2.437 m)	47.01 ft (14.33 m)	151.7 ft (46.2 m)	388.7 ft (118.5 m)	77 gr (5.0 g)	370 gr (24 g)
.45 in (11.43 mm)	Springfield model 1884	United States	1,301 ft/s (397 m/s)	875 ft/s (267 m/s)	676 ft/s (206 m/s)	523 ft/s (159 m/s)	404 ft/s (123 m/s)	8.574 ft (2.613 m)	46.88 ft (14.29 m)	142.3 ft (43.4 m)	343.0 ft (104.5 m)	70 gr (4.5 g)	500 gr (32 g)
.40 in (10.16 mm)	Enfield-Martini	United Kingdom	1,570 ft/s (480 m/s)	947 ft/s (289 m/s)	719 ft/s (219 m/s)	553 ft/s (169 m/s)	424 ft/s (129 m/s)	6.704 ft (2.043 m)	39.00 ft (11.89 m)	122.0 ft (37.2 m)	298.47 ft (90.97 m)	85 gr (5.5 g)	384 gr (24.9 g)

== Gallery ==
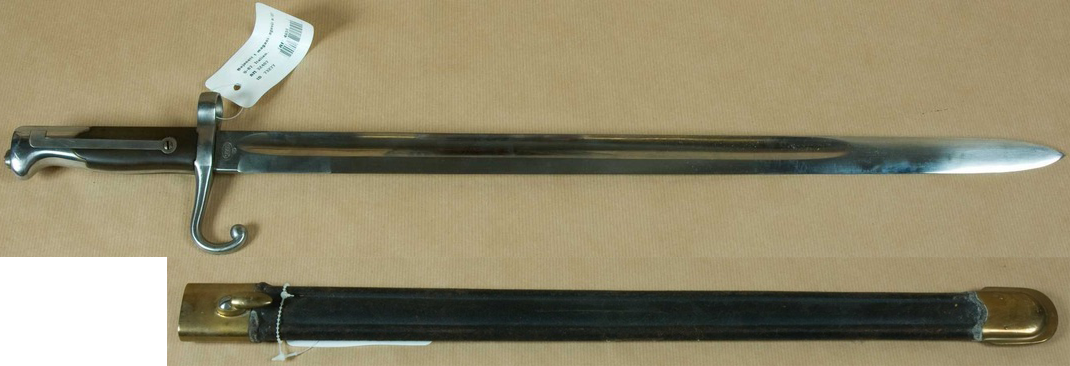
Bayonet and scabbard

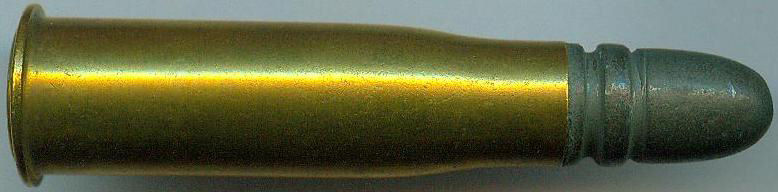
M.70 cartridge

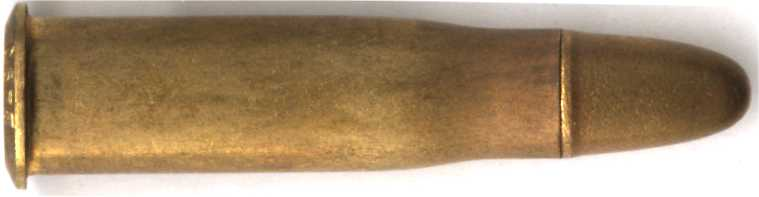
M.90 cartridge

== Sources ==
- Italian Vetterli MILITARY RIFLES IN THE AGE OF TRANSITION
- M1870/87 Italian Vetterli-Vitali Military Rifles in the Age of Transition

For the specifications and the service history of the Italian Vetterli-Vitali rifles. M1870/87 and the M1870/87/15: ,

- First Italo-Ethiopian War,
  - Battaglia_dell'Amba_Alagi,
  - Battaglia_di_Adua,
  - Vetterli-Vitali_Mod._1870/87,
  - Vetterli-Vitali_Mod._1870/87/15

For amendments and additions (July 2, 2015) Typographical, Vitali clip design and function, Eritrean Cav.Carbine, Salerno method, Safety of Ball 6,5 ammunition: Personal examination and research by Dr. Astrid M.Vallati MD, JD. (DocAV) AV Ballistics Technical and Forensic Services, Brisbane, Australia. Rifles examined: M1870/87 Long Rifle, ex-Tsarist Russia, ex SCW; Moschetto TS M1870/87 AOI marked; Moschetto Cavalleria Eritrea M1870/88: Provenance Confirmed, Bringback to Australia, in 1928, by Surveyor-Gen. of Sudan; Acquired from grandson of same in 1990s, with Certificate of Sudan Service. Fucile M70/87/15 Cal. 6,5mm.
