= Salvatore Carcano =

Italian inventor

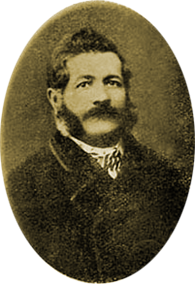
Salvatore Carcano

Salvatore Carcano (Bobbiate, 11 October 1827 - Turin, 1903) was an Italian inventor known for designing the Carcano bolt-action rifle, adopted by the Italian Regio Esercito throughout World War I and World War II.

== Biography ==
He was born near the industrialized city of Varese in the then-Austrian Lombardo-Veneto, in a family of modest income. He enlisted as a volunteer in the Lombard artillery in April 1848 during the First Italian War of Independence, after the Austrian victory he fled to Piedmont and was admitted into the Sardinian artillery as "Cadet gunsmith". When his enlistment expired in 1852 he was immediately employed by the Royal Arms Factory in Turin, quickly rising through the ranks. His work (including machinery designed by him for precision working of rifle parts), contributing to Piedmontese effort to prepare for the Crimean War, earned him a medal and a diploma in 1858.

After travelling in France and Switzerland from 1862 to 1863 to acquire and inspect machinery, in 1868 he was involved in the design of a new breech-loading rifle for the Regio Esercito, who was looking to convert its existing stocks of the muzzle-loader Fucile Mod. 1860 into a needle gun, being unable to build from scratch a new gun due to financial reasons; Carcano applied to the Doersch-Baumgarten bolt the security of the Dreyse, with satisfying results. The resulting Fucile Mod. 1867 was thus adopted by the Italian army, till its substitution with the M1870 Italian Vetterli.

Most notably, he gave the decisive contribution for the realization of the Fucile Modello 1891 ("the ninety-one", as commonly known in Italy); he coupled his own bolt design, derived from that of the Mod. 1867, to the Mannlicher-type charger clip. His accomplishment earned him a sum of money and the title of knight of the Order of Saints Maurice and Lazarus.

He retired in 1896, and died in Turin in 1903.

== Bibliography ==
- Morin, Marco (1974). Dal Carcano al FAL. Milan: Editoriale Olimpia.
- Rotasso, Gianrodolfo; Ruffo, Maurizio (1997). L'armamento individuale dell'esercito italiano dal 1861 al 1943. Stato Maggiore dell'Esercito - Ufficio Storico. ISBN 9780000154583.
