= Tromboncino M28 grenade launcher =

Interwar-era grenade launcher developed in Italy

The Tromboncino M28 ('Little Trombone') was an interwar period infantry weapon developed by the Italians. It combined a grenade launcher with a carbine.

== Purpose ==
The grenade launcher was permanently mounted on the right-hand side of a modified Carcano M91TS carbine. This was the Carcano M91/28 Moschetto per Truppe Speciali, 'carbine for special troops', i.e. a carbine intended for those other than front-line infantry such as machine gun crews, a shortened version of the M91 infantry rifle.

The intention of the combined weapon was to give infantry riflemen their own grenade launcher capability, instead of relying on crew-served mortars.

== Operation ==
The launcher was permanently attached to the carbine, but only one could be used at a time. It used a unique 'shared bolt' system: to use the grenade launcher, the carbine's bolt was removed from the receiver of the carbine and installed in the launcher.

The grenade was of 38.5 mm calibre. The standard S.R.2 grenade weighed around 160 grammes, with a cast-iron head, a finned aluminium tail and an explosive filling. It had an effective range of up to 200 m, with a small blast radius. Grenades were impact-fuzed, with a safety ring pin removed before loading them through the muzzle, where they were then retained by a spring detent.

Grenades were propelled by a standard-issue rifle round, in 6.5×52mm Carcano, with a standard bullet. (Note: Most 'cup' launchers of this period required the shooter to carry blank cartridges) This was loaded individually into the breech. Inside the launcher was a bullet trap, a steel plug between the chamber and the grenade, with four gas ports around it. The bullet trap was part of a 'spigot' within the grenade chamber, although this was not a spigot mortar, (Note: In a true spigot mortar, the propellant gas pressure is only applied on a small diameter, that of the spigot.) but merely a distance piece keeping the grenade from seating at the bottom of the chamber. This made the lower part of the chamber into an expansion space, giving a high-low chamber pressure effect, as used by modern 40 mm grenades. The bullet trap was headspaced to have the bullet resting on it before firing. The cartridge chamber was relieved at the front of the case, so that the bullet did not move when fired and instead the cartridge bottleneck crimp blew out sideways. This allowed the bullet trap to be of lighter construction, as the bullet did not hit it with any significant energy, also the bullet was not 'trapped' in the trap but could fall out easily after firing, once the bolt was removed. If the bullet did jam in the trap, the fore end of the spigot was squared and could be unscrewed by a wrench in the rifle toolkit.

A single trigger worked both weapons, depending on where the bolt was installed. As both receivers were fitted to the same bolt, both were identically numbered. The same rear sight was also used for both, although with separate markings and separate fore sights. WWI-era rifle grenades were fired by placing the butt of the rifle on the ground, as the recoil of firing a much heavier hand grenade could injure the firer. (Note: The Mills bomb weighs five times the S.R.2 grenade, and the .303 British cartridge can give 3,500 J of energy, compared to 2,500 J for the Carcano. Although the cartridge energy difference is not itself substantial, the heavier grenade at the same kinetic energy would involve significantly more momentum and thus felt recoil, about $\sqrt {3500 / 2500 \times 5 } = \sqrt {7} \simeq 2.5$ times as much.) Also these heavier grenades, still propelled by a single rifle cartridge, had slow, high-arching trajectories needing greater elevation.

A separate sight was provided for the grenade launcher, similar to a long-range volley sight. The existing adjustable sight had an additional V notch added to the left-hand side. Together with a post foresight mounted on the side of the stock, this gave a high-angle sight. The rear sight was adjustable by the usual Carcano mechanism, but had new graduations on the side for grenade ranges of 100, 150 and 200 m.

== Drawbacks ==
The obvious drawback was the slow process of moving the bolt from one breech to the other, with the weapon unfirable in the meantime. Despite the economy of sharing the bolt, the overall weapon was still heavy and expensive.

They were withdrawn from service in 1934, with the weapons being converted to the regular M91/TS configuration. The infantry's need for an organic mortar capacity was then met by the conventional 45 mm Brixia Model 35, introduced in 1935. A few have been reported to have survived into WWII service, but this appears most unlikely, given the unique ammunition required.

== Modern examples ==
Modern examples are rare. Although not seen as particularly collectible, their scarcity makes them valuable. One for sale in a 2018 US auction sold for $4,888. Like other contemporary rifle grenade launchers, US regulations allow them to be collected and the carbine part fired as a Curio and Relic, although any live grenades would be classed as destructive devices.
