= Brixia Model 35 =

Mortaio d'assalto Brixia Mod. 35
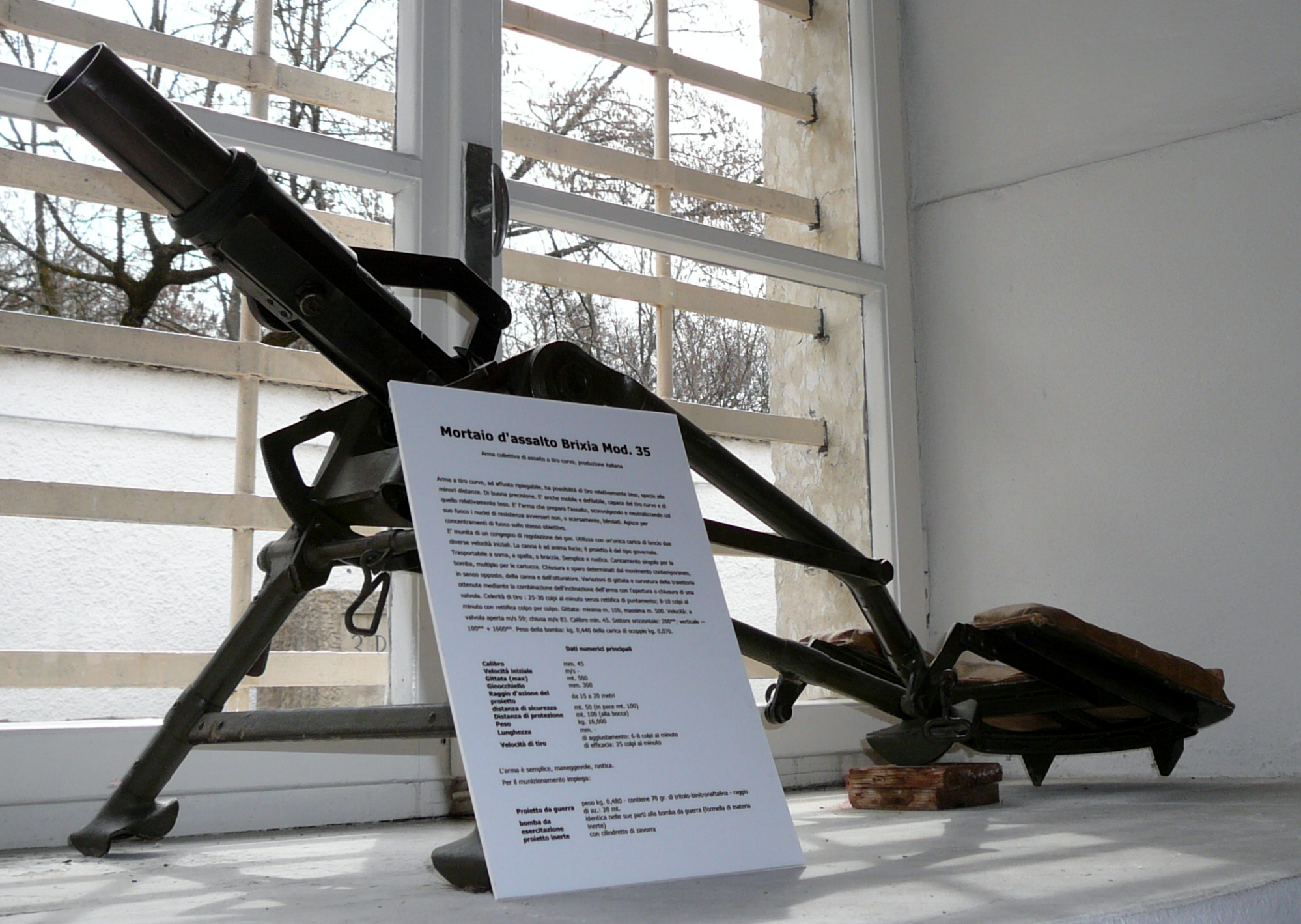
- Type: Infantry mortar
- Place of origin: Kingdom of Italy

Service history
- In service: 3 October 1935 – c. January 1950
- Used by: Kingdom of Italy
- Wars: Second Italo-Ethiopian War; Spanish Civil War; World War II

Production history
- Designed: 1935
- Manufacturer: M.B.T. (Metallurgica Bresciana già Tempini)
- Produced: 1935-1943

Specifications
- Mass: 15.5 kg (34 lb)
- Barrel length: 26 cm (10 in) L/5.4
- Crew: 2
- Shell: 465 g (1 lb) (Mod.35)
- Caliber: 45 mm (1.8 in)
- Elevation: -5.6° to +90°
- Traverse: 20°
- Rate of fire: 8-10 rpm
- Muzzle velocity: 83 m/s (270 ft/s)
- Maximum firing range: 530 m (580 yd)

The Mortaio d'assalto Brixia Mod. 35 or Mortaio da 45 Mod. 35 was a small-sized, rapid-firing Italian light mortar of World War II. The Brixia Modello 35 provided light supporting fire to infantry companies. It was issued at battalion level, with each battalion containing nine mortars divided between each infantry company. It had a reasonable rate of fire, but lacked power due to its small round. It was widely used, and saw action on every major Italian front.

== Description ==
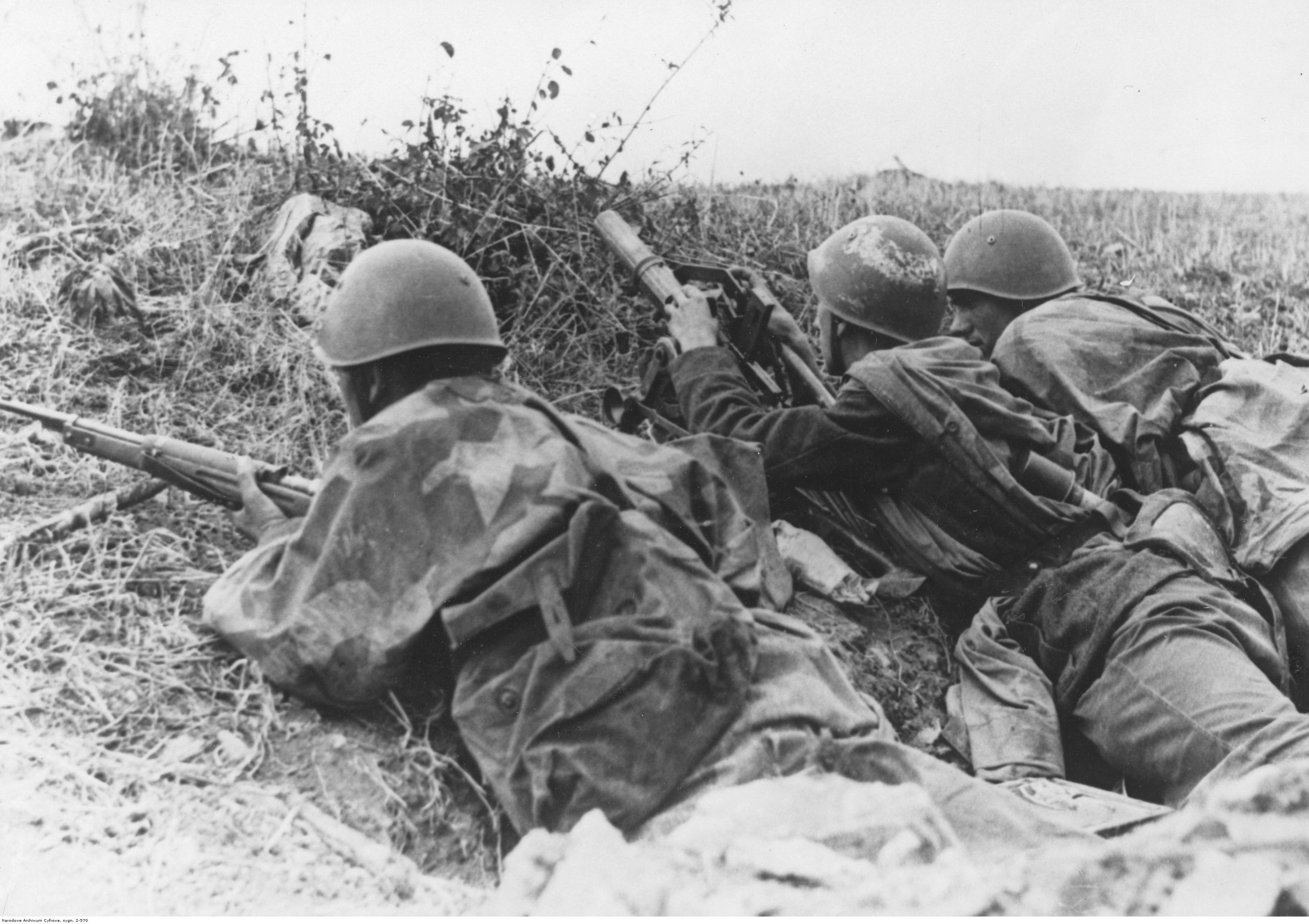
Brixia light mortar in action.

The Brixia light mortar is a 45 mm calibre light mortar mounted on a legged base and designed for operation by two crew. The rear legs are fitted with a pad for the gunner to lay forward behind the mortar or sit upon when the situation allows. A lever allowed for operating the breech and firing the weapon while the loader fed ammunition. Well-trained teams could reach up to 18 rounds per minute, although the operational rate of fire was less intense to avoid damage to the firing tube. The Brixia mortar differed from comparable World War II weapons in that it was trigger-fired with the help of separate ignition cartridges to be fed into a special magazine, making the weapon more similar to modern cannon mortars than conventional parabolic grenade launchers of the time.

At the tactical level, an infantry battalion had two platoons of 9 Brixia mortars assigned. Each Brixia mortar platoon was divided into three squads with three mortars each, distributed to the companies. The heavier 81mm mortar was assigned to the heavy weapons company of the regiment.

The Brixia was a complicated weapon but could lay down exact and intense fire curtains. This was offset by the shells, which fragmented poorly and, due to the limited calibre, had a very light and low-yield warhead. The weapon served on every front where Italian troops were involved (North Africa, Balkans, East Africa, Southern Russia, France) and was employed to defend the homeland against invading allied troops. During clashes between RSI formations and Italian partisans on both sides, due to many Italian partisans having a former military background, it was one of the few support weapons that could be found in the hands of the local Resistance. Mortars used by the German units fighting alongside the Italians were given the designation 4.5 cm GrW 176(i).

== Users ==
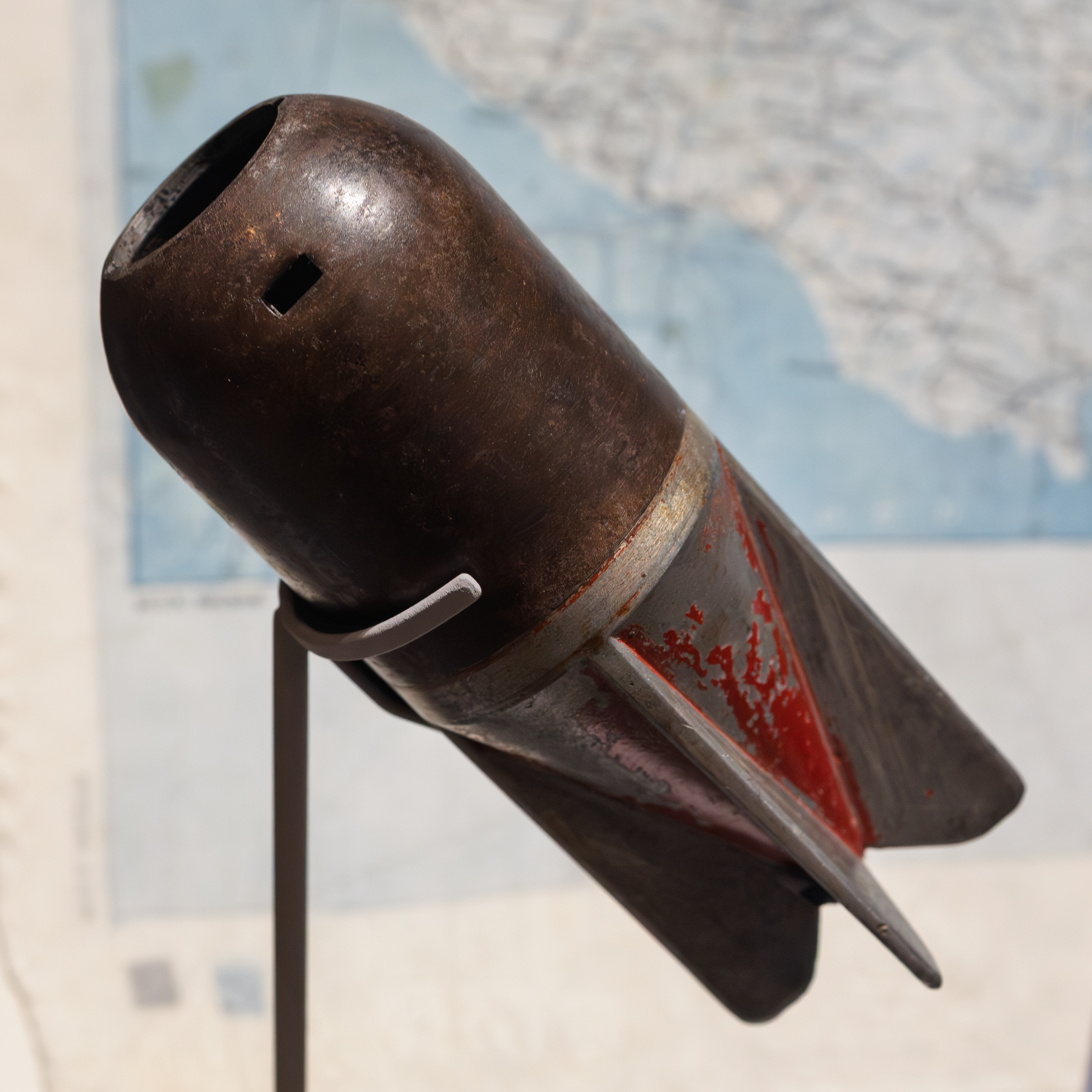
Ammunition for the Brixia Model 35

- Nazi Germany
- Spanish State
- Kingdom of Greece: captured from the Italians
- Kingdom of Italy
- Italian Social Republic
- Yugoslav Partisans

== See also ==
- Tromboncino M28 grenade launcher, a combined carbine and rifle grenade launcher, used unsuccessfully prior to the Model 35
- List of infantry mortars
