= Cacciatori d'Africa =

African Hunters
- Cacciatori d'Africa
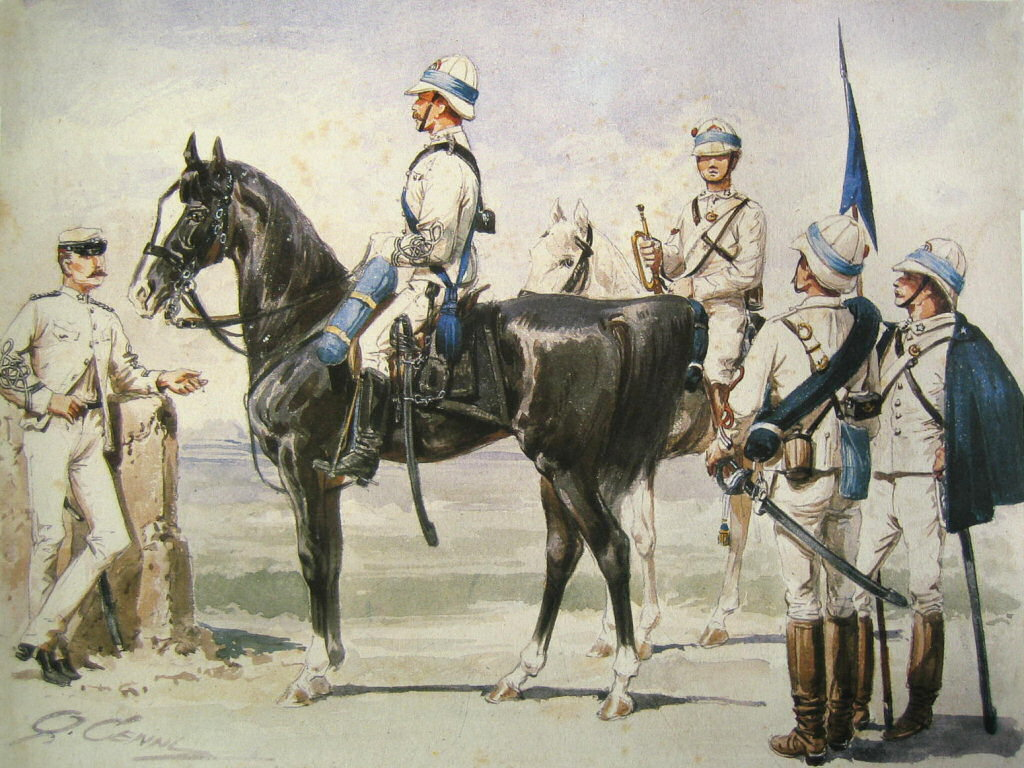
- Italian Cavalry in East Africa, 1885–86
- Active: July 14, 1887–1937
- Country: Italy
- Type: Regiment and battalion
- Role: Infantry and mounted infantry

The Cacciatori d'Africa (literally "African Hunters") were Italian light infantry and mounted infantry units raised for colonial service in Africa. Cacciatori units later served in Somalia, Eritrea, Tripolitania and Cyrenaica for the Italian colonial empire. Partially mechanised in the early 1920s, the Cacciatori d'Africa remained part of the Regio Corpo Truppe Coloniali (transl. Royal Corps of Colonial Troops) until 1942.

== History ==
=== Eritrea ===
After the 1887 Battle of Dogali, the Governor of Italian Eritrea Depretis decided to increase Italian military forces to reconquer lost territory and secure the colony. The Royal Decree n. 4783 of 14 July 1887, created a new corps comprising three battalions of infantry, plus a squadron of mounted soldiers, in Eritrea as part of the Corpo Speciale per L'Africa (Special Corps of Africa).

Recruited initially amongst volunteers from the line infantry and grenadier regiments of the metropolitan army, the Cacciatori d'Africa were subsequently partly conscripted from Italian colonial settlers. Intended as swift infantry Jäger-like skirmishers, the foot soldiers were supported by mounted infantry that rode on horses or camels.

In 1887, the Cacciatori d'Africa included five battalions. With a regal decree of December 11, 1892, recruitment included Italian colonists, and the five battalions were reduced to one, composed of six companies. The Royal Corps of Colonial Troops was established on February 18, 1894, and the Cacciatori participated in the 1896 Battle of Adwa, where they were stationed at an Adigrat fort under the command of Major Marcello Prestinari.

The Cacciatori left Eritrea when the Royal Corps of Colonial Troops was reorganized in 1919.

=== Libya ===
After the Italo-Turkish War, the formation of Italian Libya, and the outbreak of World War One, the Libyan people rebelled, particularly the Senussi population. The "Cacciatori d'Africa" was a volunteer force established to protect the Italian colonists and equipped with trucks and armored cars.

=== Italian East Africa ===
The name "Cacciatori d'Africa" was eventually reused by the 40th Infantry Division Cacciatori d'Africa in Italian East Africa during the Second World War.

== Uniforms and equipment ==
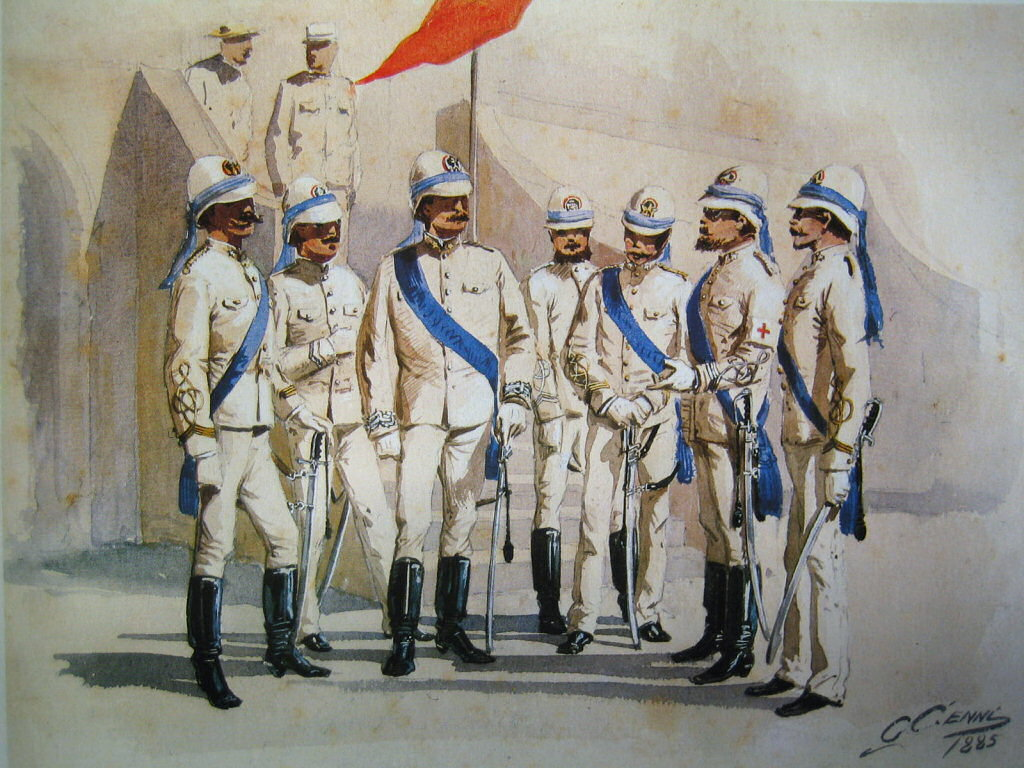
Italian officers in 1885

=== Eritrea ===
The Cacciatori d'Africa had standard armament for colonial troops. Up until the Battle of Adwa in 1896, they continued to use muskets and rifles of the M1870 Italian Vetterli and Vetterli-Vitali Mod. 1870/87 models. Those were replaced by the more modern Carcano rifles. On the right side of their helmets, the foot infantry wore a feather, while the mounted infantry had a black feather.

=== Libya ===
The uniforms were the standard grey-green of colonial or "continental" units of the Italian Kingdom. The infantry also wore black gorget patches with a red border marked by a Stellette militari. The first helmets they used were made of cork, as was typical for colonial military units. In the 1910s, they switched to khaki pith helmets, inspired by the English cavalry of the Boer War. During the 1920s, the pith helmets were replaced with hats similar to the Cappello Alpino, without a feather or tassel. Canvas bandoliers were also often used, much like hunters, the Zaptié, and the Méhariste.

== Military structure ==
=== 1888 ===
- Special African Corp (General Alessandro Asinari di San Marzano)
  - 1st Brigade (General Carlo Genè)
    - 1st Special African Regiment (Colonel Coriolano Ponza di San Martino)
      - 1st Battalion (Major Carlo Rodano)
      - 2nd Battalion (Lieutenant Colonel Giovan Battista Luciano)
      - Battalion of Bersaglieri
    - 2nd Special African Regiment (Colonel Camillo De Charbonneau)
      - 3rd Battalion (Major Camillo Fiore)
      - 4th Battalion (Major Pio Carlo Di Majo)
      - 5th Battalion (Lieutenant Colonel Gustavo Ferrua)
    - Squadron of cavalry
    - Brigade of artillery, with four companies of gunners
    - Command company
    - Health company
    - Logistics company
    - Transport company
    - Bashi-bazouk irregulars

=== 1923 ===
- Royal Colonial Troops of Tripolitania
  - 1st Battalion (Zuwarah)
  - 2nd Battalion (Tripoli)
- Royal Colonial Troops of Cirenaica
  - 3rd Battalion (Benghazi)
    - 1st Squadron Armored Car (8 Lancia 1ZMs)
    - 2nd Squadron Armored Car (3 Lancia 1ZMs, 2 Fiat-Terni Tripoli, 2 Lanchester armoured cars)
  - 4th Battalion
    - 1st Squadron Armored Car (12 Fiat-Terni Tripolis)
    - 2nd Squadron Armored Car (8 armed Fiat 15 trucks)
  - 5th Battalion

=== 1935 ===
- Royal Colonial Troops of Libya
  - 1st Infantry Regiment of Africa
    - Command company
    - 1 battalion of tank hunters
    - 1 battalion of Milizia Coloniale
    - 1 storage depot
  - 2nd Infantry Regiment of Africa
    - Command company
    - 1 battalion of tank hunters
    - 1 battalion of Milizia Coloniale
    - 1 storage depot
