= Medium machine gun =

Usually refers to a belt-fed automatic firearm firing a full-power rifle cartridge

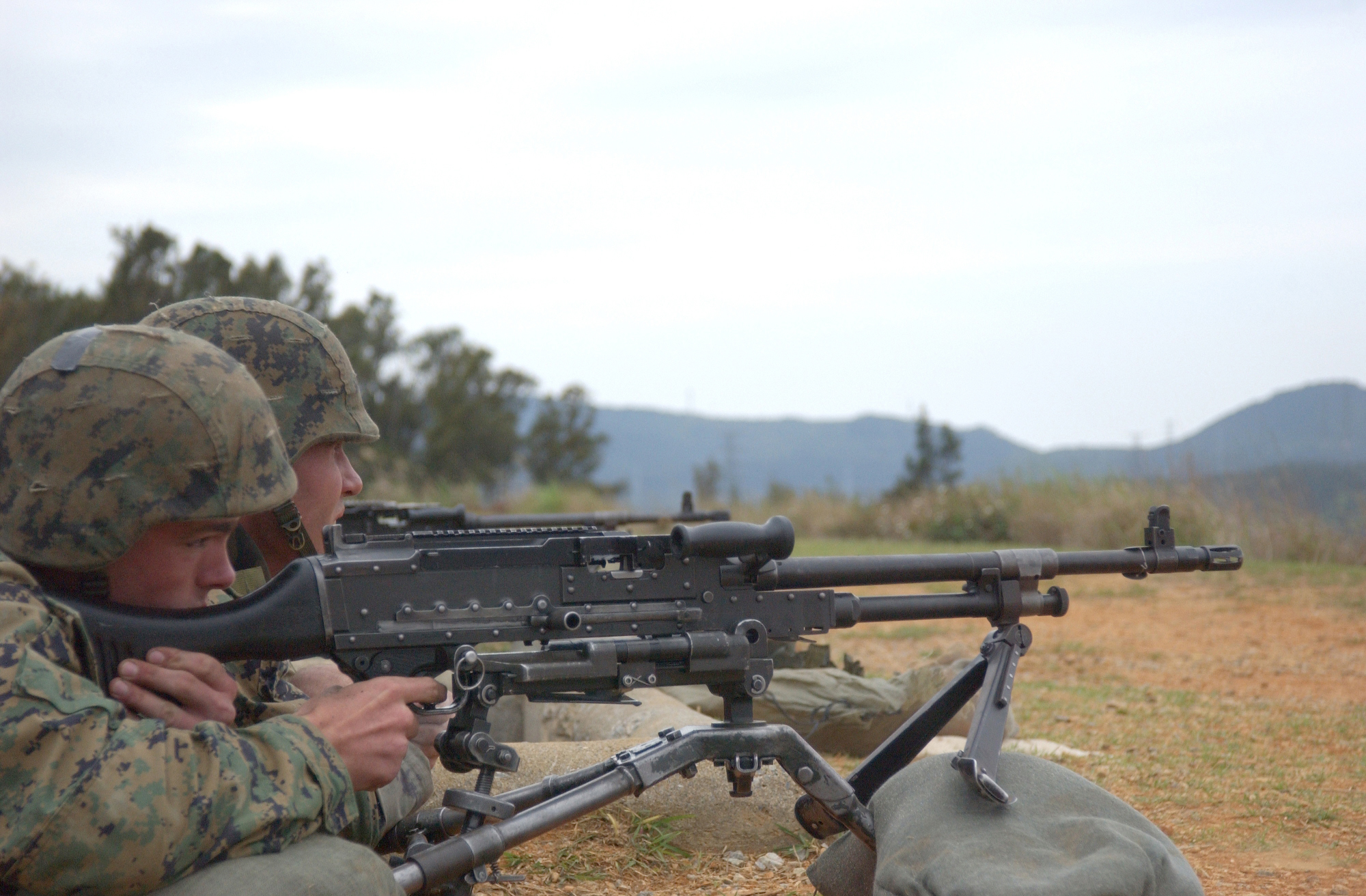
U.S. Marines firing an M240G at Camp Hansen, Okinawa

A medium machine gun (MMG), in modern terms, usually refers to a belt-fed machine gun firing a full-powered rifle cartridge, and is considered "medium" in weight (15–40 lb or 6.8–18.1 kg). Medium machine guns are light enough to be infantry-portable by a single individual (as opposed to a heavy machine gun, which completely relies on mounting onto a weapons platform for operational stability and mobility and is typically carried separate from the tripod by a second soldier). Many medium machine guns are also considered general-purpose machine guns as they are broadly useful across a variety of infantry roles and can be mounted to a wide range of vehicles, aircraft, or static mounts; however the overlap is not complete, as not all MMGs are GPMGs and not all GPMGs are MMGs.

== History ==
=== Late 19th century ===
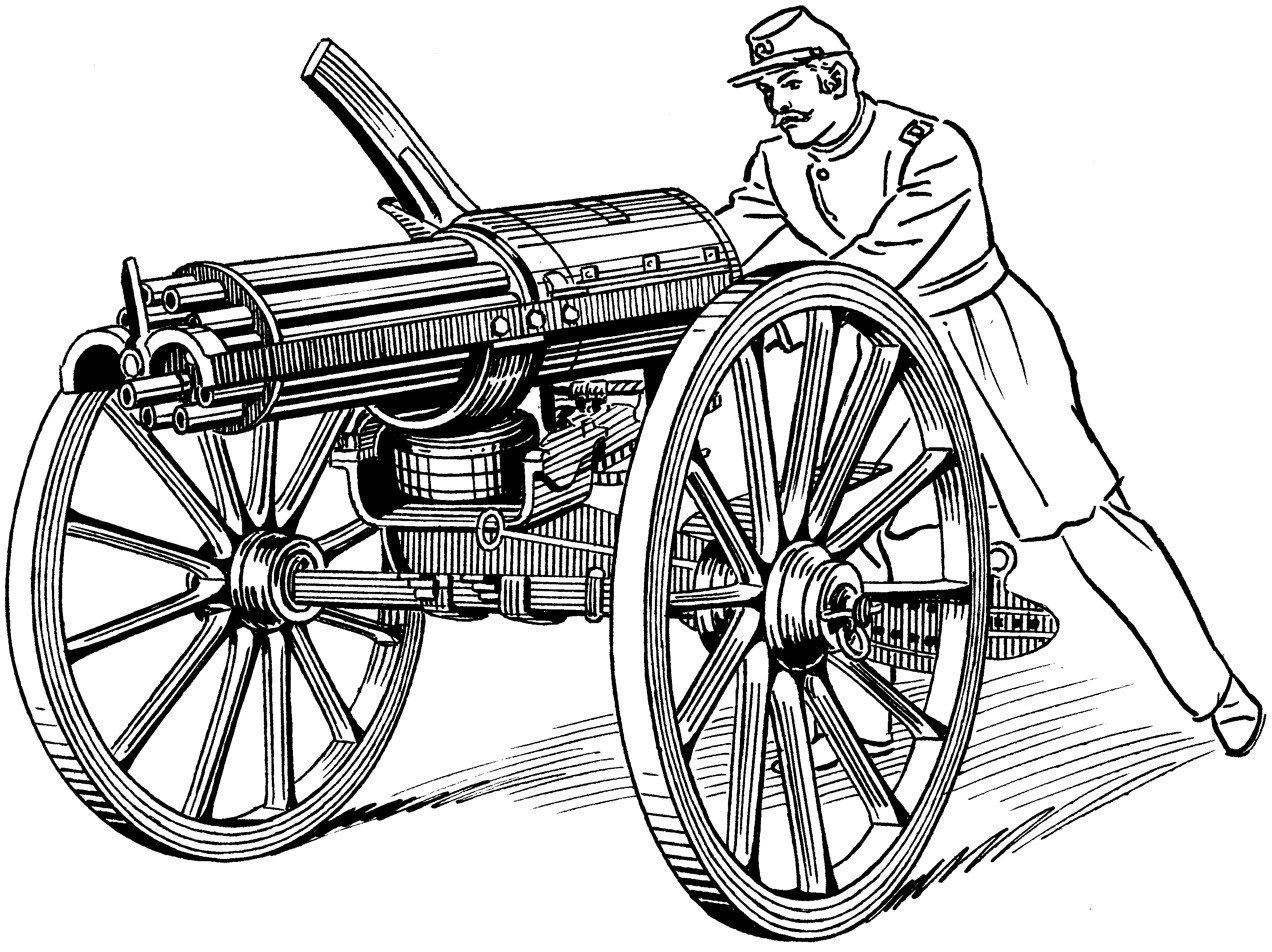
Hand cranked, multi-barrelled Gatling gun

In the late 19th century, Gatling guns and other externally powered types, such as the Nordenfelt, were often made in different ranges of calibers, such as half-inch and one-inch. Thanks to their many barrels, overheating was not a major issue, and they were also quite heavy, being, essentially, heavy machine guns.

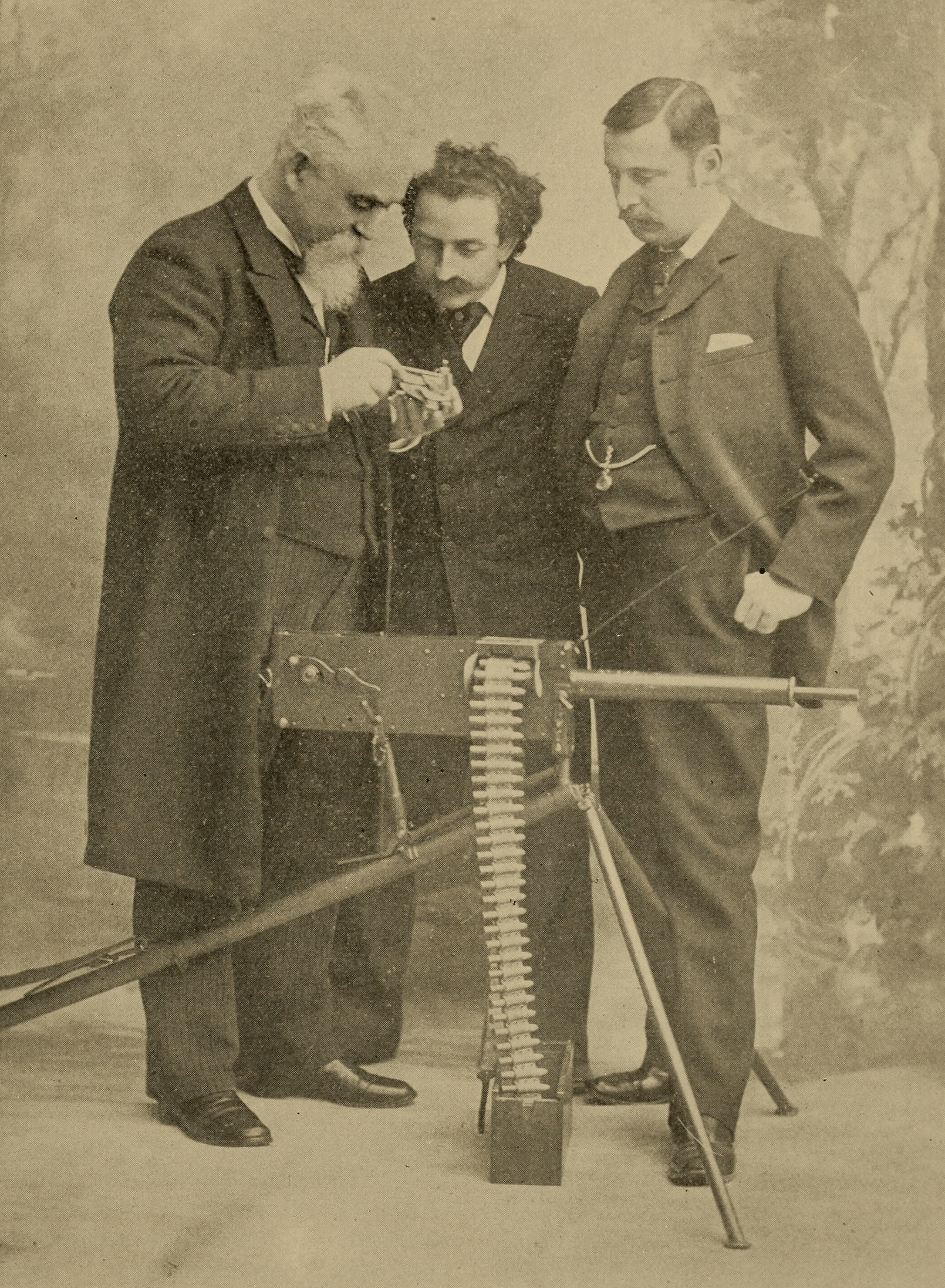
Less bulky, automatic, single-barrelled Maxim gun

When Hiram Maxim developed his recoil-powered machine gun that used a single barrel, the first main design was a modest 26 pounds (11.8 kg) in weight, firing a .45-inch rifle caliber bullet (from a 24 inch long barrel). As depicted in a famous photo of Maxim, it could be picked up complete with its 15-pound (6.8 kg) tripod with one arm. It was similar to later-design medium machine guns, but it could not be fired for extended periods. As a result, he created a water-jacket cooling system to enable it to fire for extended periods. This added significant weight, as did changes to more powerful cartridges. However, the much lighter total weight possible by using recoil to power automatic loading was not lost on the firearms designers of the day, resulting in other automatic firearms that used this concept, such as the Borchardt pistol, the Cei-Rigotti rifle, the Madsen 1902, as well as lighter, gas-operated, air-cooled designs.

=== Early 20th century ===
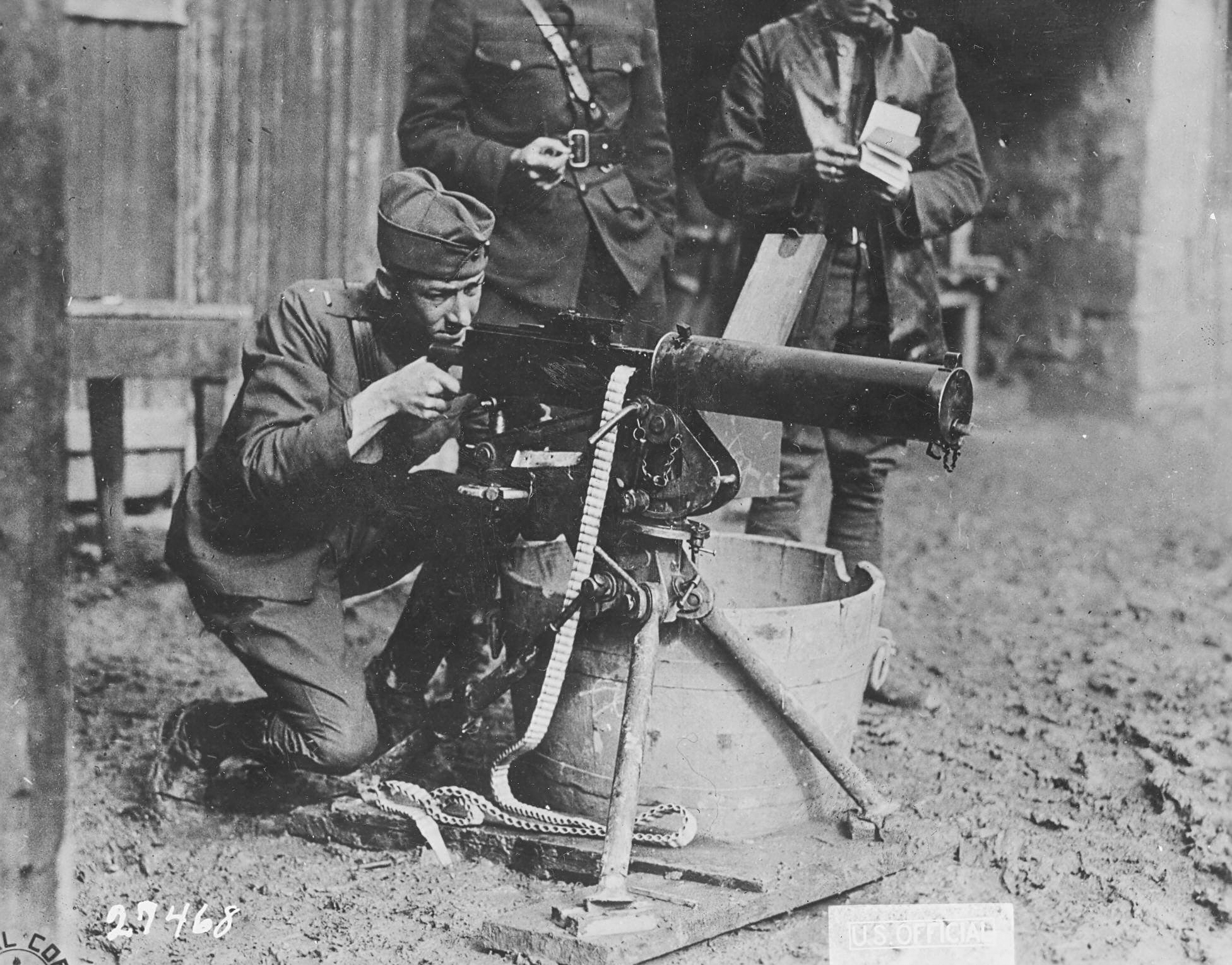
Water cooled M1917 demonstrated in 1918

Many new designs were developed, some powered by air or recoil, or a combination of the two (e.g., the Colt 1895 and M1895, Hotchkiss M1909, PM M1910, Fiat–Revelli Modello 1914, Fiat–Revelli Modello 1935, Breda M37, and Breda 38). Also, instead of the rather heavy water jacket, new designs introduced other types of cooling, such as barrel replacement, metal fins, and/or heat sinks or some combination of all of them.

Machine guns then diverged into heavier and lighter designs. The later model water-cooled Maxim gun and its derivatives (the MG 08 and the Vickers gun), as well as the American Browning Model 1917 machine gun, were all substantial weapons. The .303 inch Vickers, for example, weighed 33 lb (15 kg) alone and on its tripod mount the total weight was 50 lb (22.7 kg). The heavy machine gun was mounted on a tripod and was often water-cooled; a well-trained and well-supplied crew could fire for hours on end. Carefully positioned heavy machine guns could stop an attacking force before they reached their objectives.

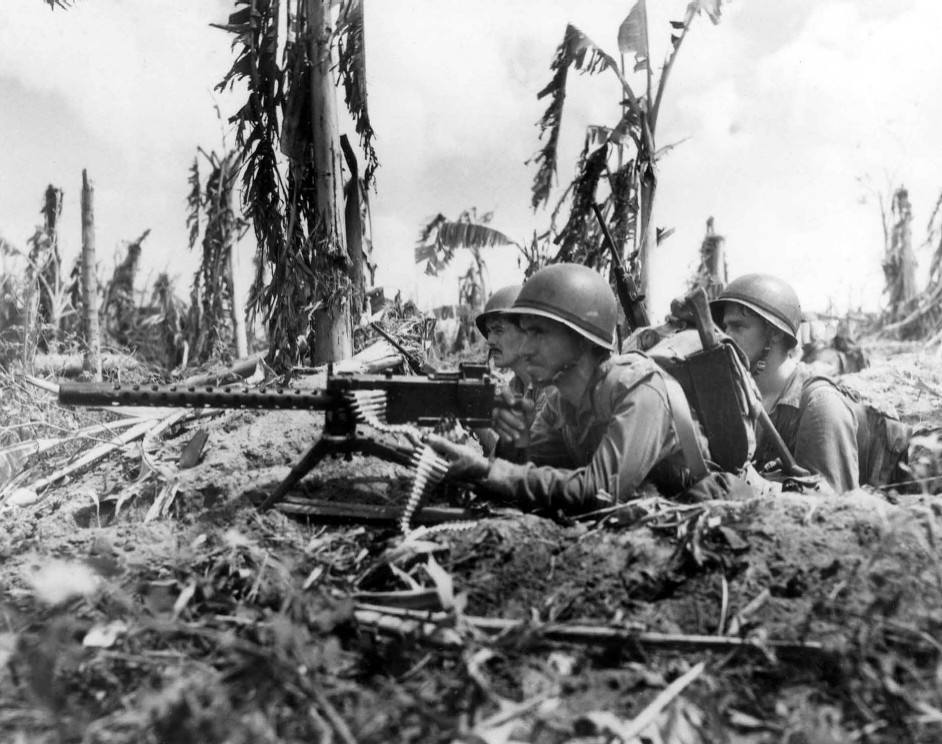
The air-cooled Browning M1919 during WW2.

The first machine guns in use before World War I covered a wide range of characteristics. In addition to these heavier designs, there were also a number of lighter types. During the same period, a number of new air-cooled designs were developed that were lighter and more mobile. In World War I, they were to be as important as the heavier designs, and were used to support squads and infantry on the move, on aircraft, and on many types of vehicle, including some tanks.

Light machine guns were introduced as lighter, more portable automatic weapons. They still fired the same full-power rifle caliber ammunition, but used lighter barrels without extra cooling and were fired from a bipod. Light machine guns were not intended to be fired for extended periods of time. The lightest of the new designs were not capable of sustained fire, as they did not have extra cooling features and were fed from a comparatively small magazine. Essentially a machine rifle with a bipod, weapons like the Chauchat or the Madsen 1902 were the most mobile, but were made for single and burst fire. These were used in assaults to great effect by infantry, but were less effective in vehicle-mounted and other applications.

The Hotchkiss Mark I (e.g. Benét–Mercié M1909) was a 27.6 lb (12.2 kg) MG that normally used a mini tripod and linkable 30-round strips or in vehicles, but there was also a belt-fed version of it. Not be confused with heavier Hotchkiss models (such as the M1914), the design proved a useful intermediate and would serve even to the end of World War II in some jobs. The design would be followed by lighter machine rifles and better medium types. They also shared a common characteristic: they fired full power rifle caliber ammunition such as 8mm Mauser or .30-06 Springfield.

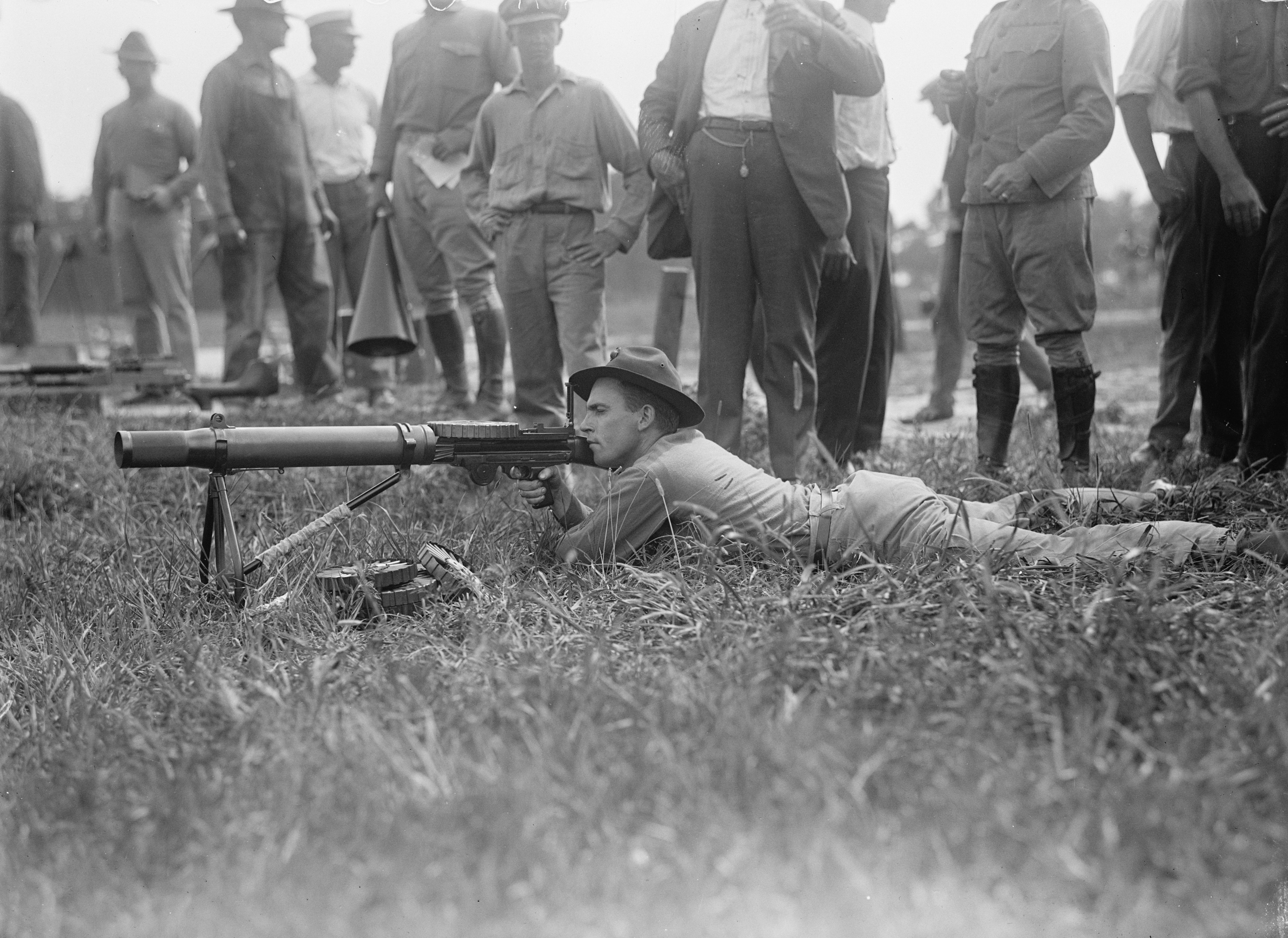
Lewis gun training, 1917

The Lewis gun, which weighed 27 lb (12.3 kg), was commonly used with a 47-round drum and bipod; it was used on the move in support of squads, and on vehicles and aircraft as well, or on a tripod (either for anti-aircraft use, or to fill in for a heavier MG). What made it very useful was that it was significantly lighter than water-cooled weapons, but could fire nearly as much due to a very large cooling assembly.

=== Mid 20th century ===
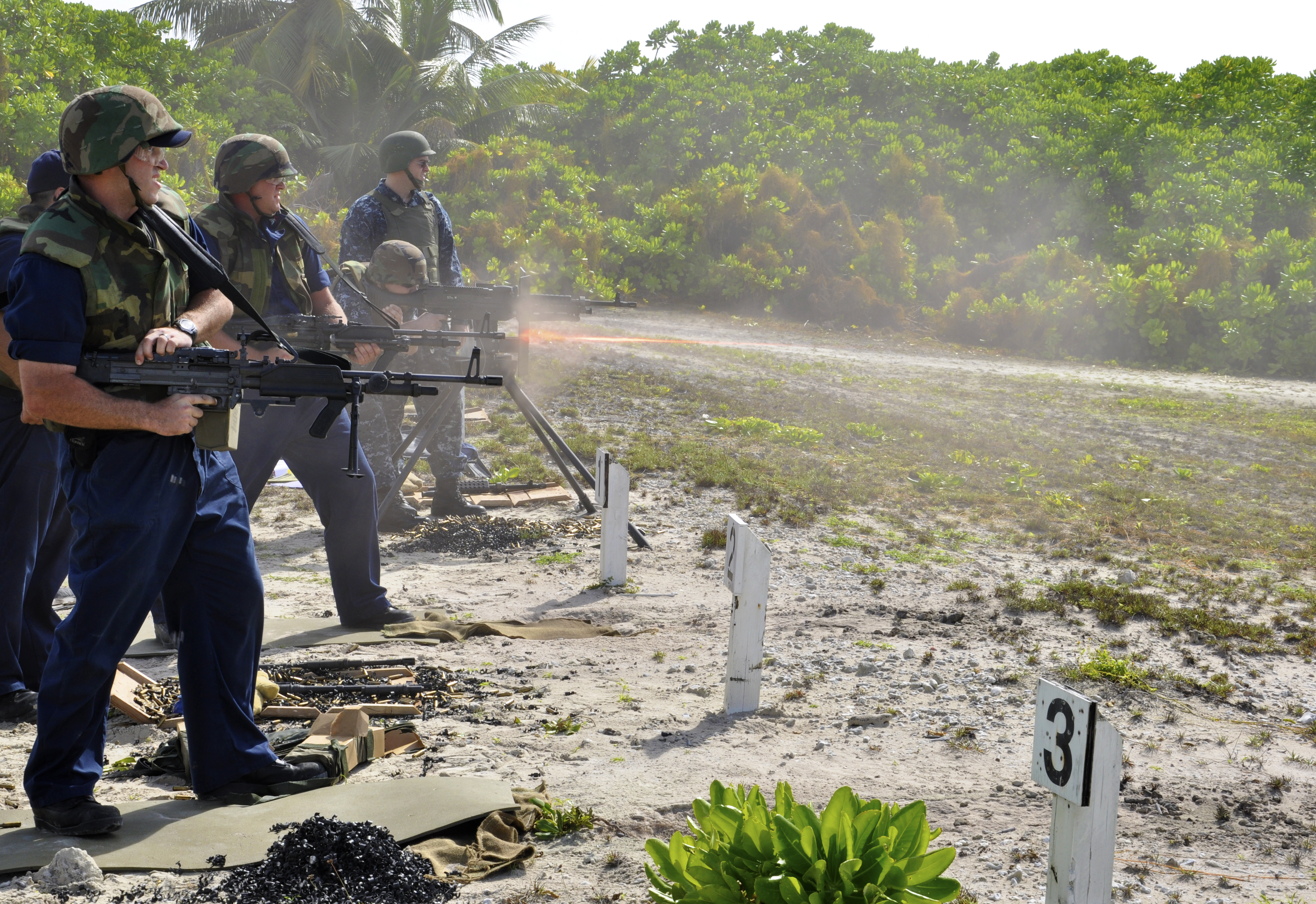
Light variants of the M60 machine gun (foreground) and a M240B (back) in use with the US Navy, 2010.

The heavier water-cooled designs continued to be used throughout World War II and into the 1960s, but were gradually phased out in favor of the lighter air-cooled designs. The mediums are now used both as heavy machine guns, while mounted on tripods, and as light machine guns, while mounted on bipods. This was possible, in part, because a heavy static MG position was not a very effective tactic in vehicle centered warfare, and the lighter air-cooled designs could nearly match the capabilities of water-cooled designs with a combination of other, lighter cooling features. This resulted in the widespread use of medium weight machine guns by infantry, but also on tanks, aircraft, and on tripods.

The practice of using medium-weight machine guns continued into the 1930s. The French made a version of their infantry machine gun, the Châtellerault M1924, with 150-round magazine and internal water cooler. The German requirement for a new medium machine gun, a Einheitsmaschinengewehr (standard machine gun), resulted in a Universelles Maschinengewehr (universal machine gun) that was to not only be a medium machine gun that was used in many roles, but was specifically named so. It was similar to older mediums in that it was a medium machine gun intended to replace older light and heavy machine guns of the same caliber, though Germany would continue using a variety of heavier and lighter automatic machine guns to a limited extent.

=== Late 20th century ===
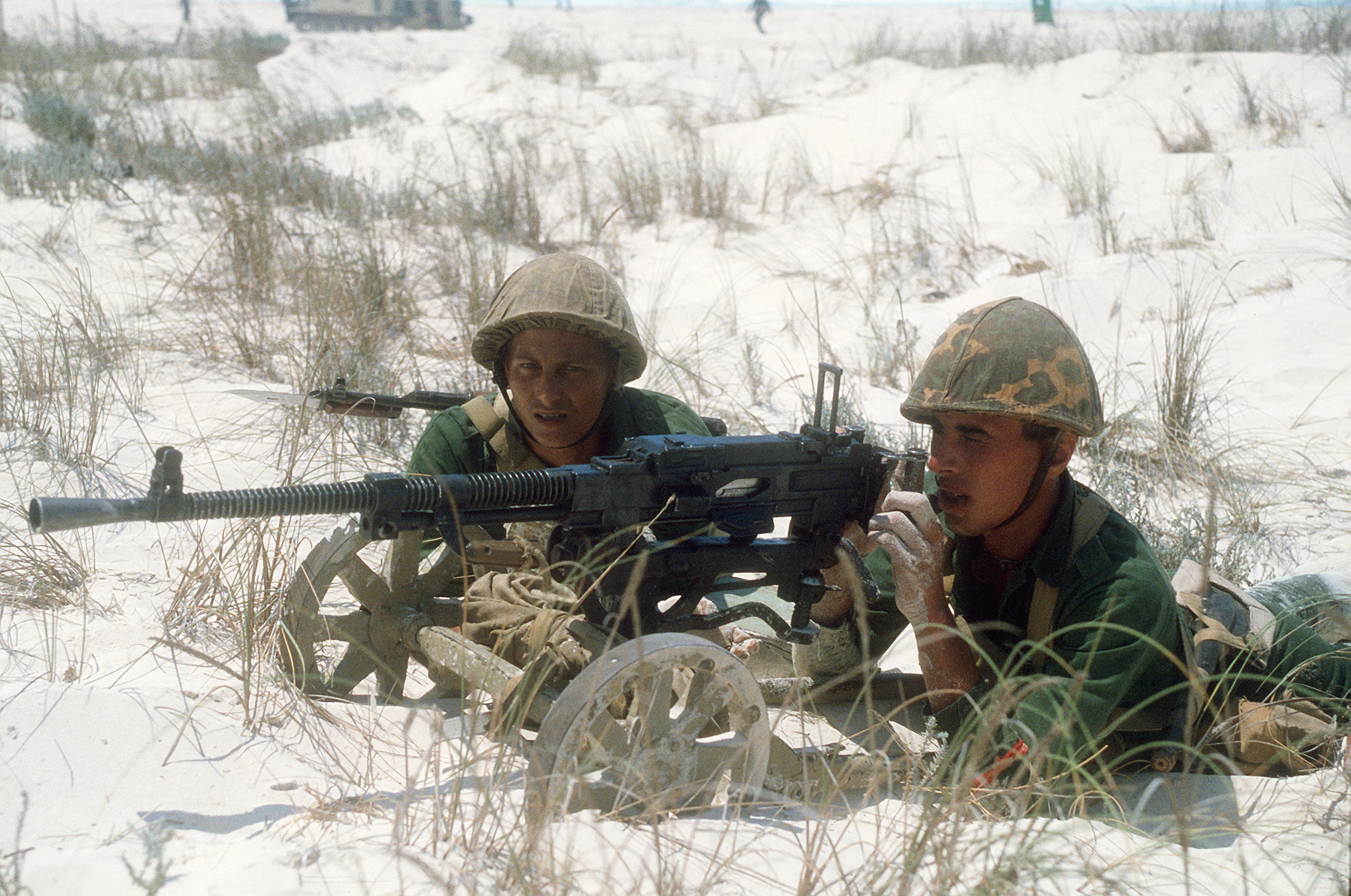
Soviet medium machine gun SG-43.

By the late 20th century, water-cooled machine guns of the same caliber as the existing mediums were no longer useful, as the situation in which they excelled (non-stop firing) was regarded as no longer being needed in modern warfare. This is because mass charges by infantry are rarely done, replaced by AFV-based thrusts, and that a static MG position is a high-priority target for infantry rocket launchers. Modern medium machine guns do not match the sustained firing ability of many older mediums; there is no longer a need for it. They can only keep firing if they have spare barrels.

==== Smaller-caliber light machine guns ====
The 1960s and 70s saw the introduction of new families of automatic weapons using smaller cartridges than the full-power rifle caliber cartridges previously in use. These weapons were called Squad Automatic Weapons (SAW). They have taken roles away from the previous medium machine guns, as well as lighter machine guns of the same caliber. However, the medium machine guns continue to be used in many of their previous roles, especially on tanks and vehicles. Often, countries field a mix of medium-caliber medium machine guns, and smaller-caliber light machine guns.

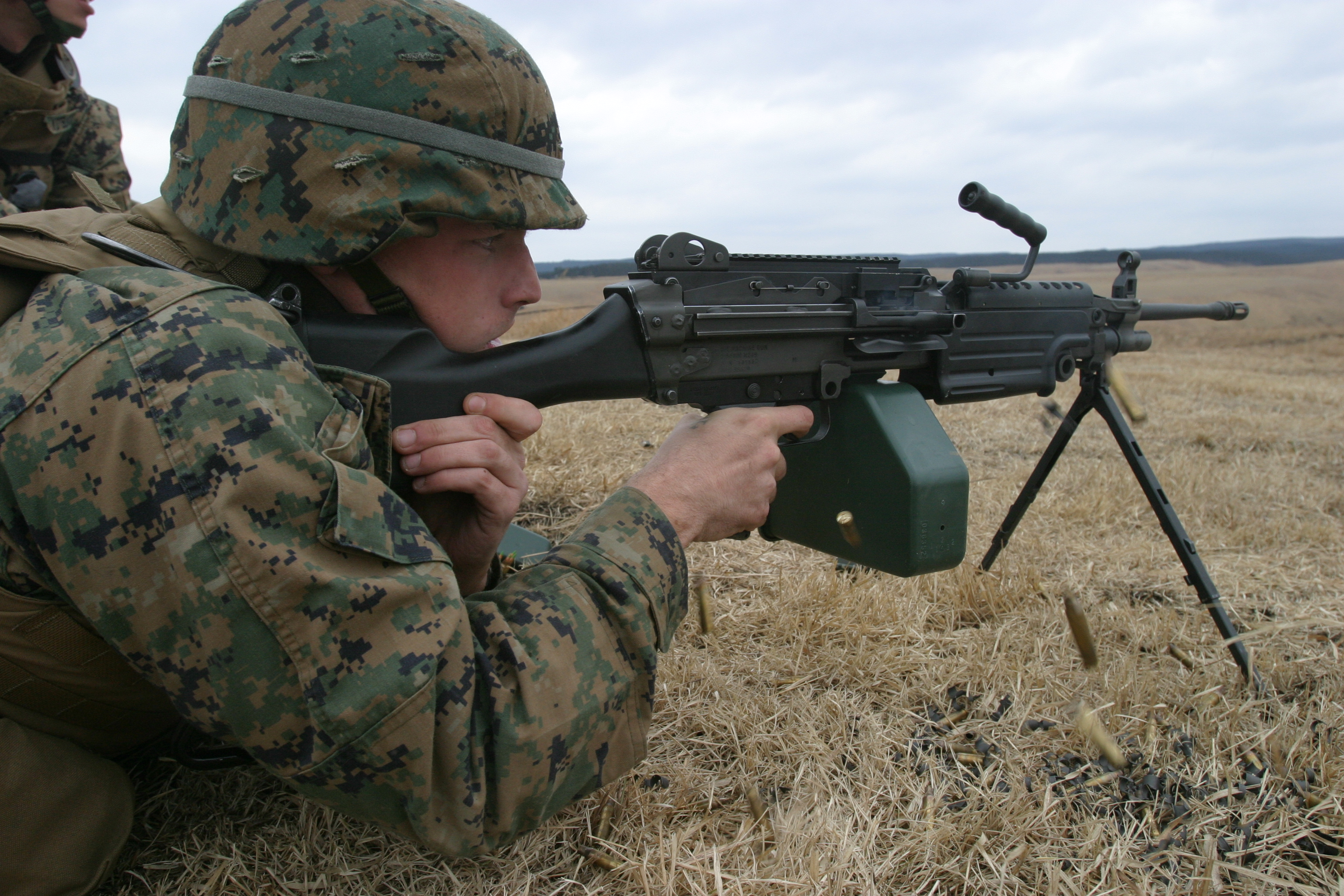
M249 in the SAW role

These weapons typically fired the 7.62×39mm cartridge fired by the AK-47 series or the 5.56×45mm NATO standard cartridge first used in the AR-15/M-16 rifles. These lightweight machine guns were designed for more sustained fire than normal infantry rifles, several hundred rounds worth of extended firing. Many models were scaled-down medium caliber designs or heavier, longer-barrel versions of infantry standard Assault rifles. Examples include the FN Minimi, M249 (US designation of the FN Minimi) or the RPK.

=== 21st century ===
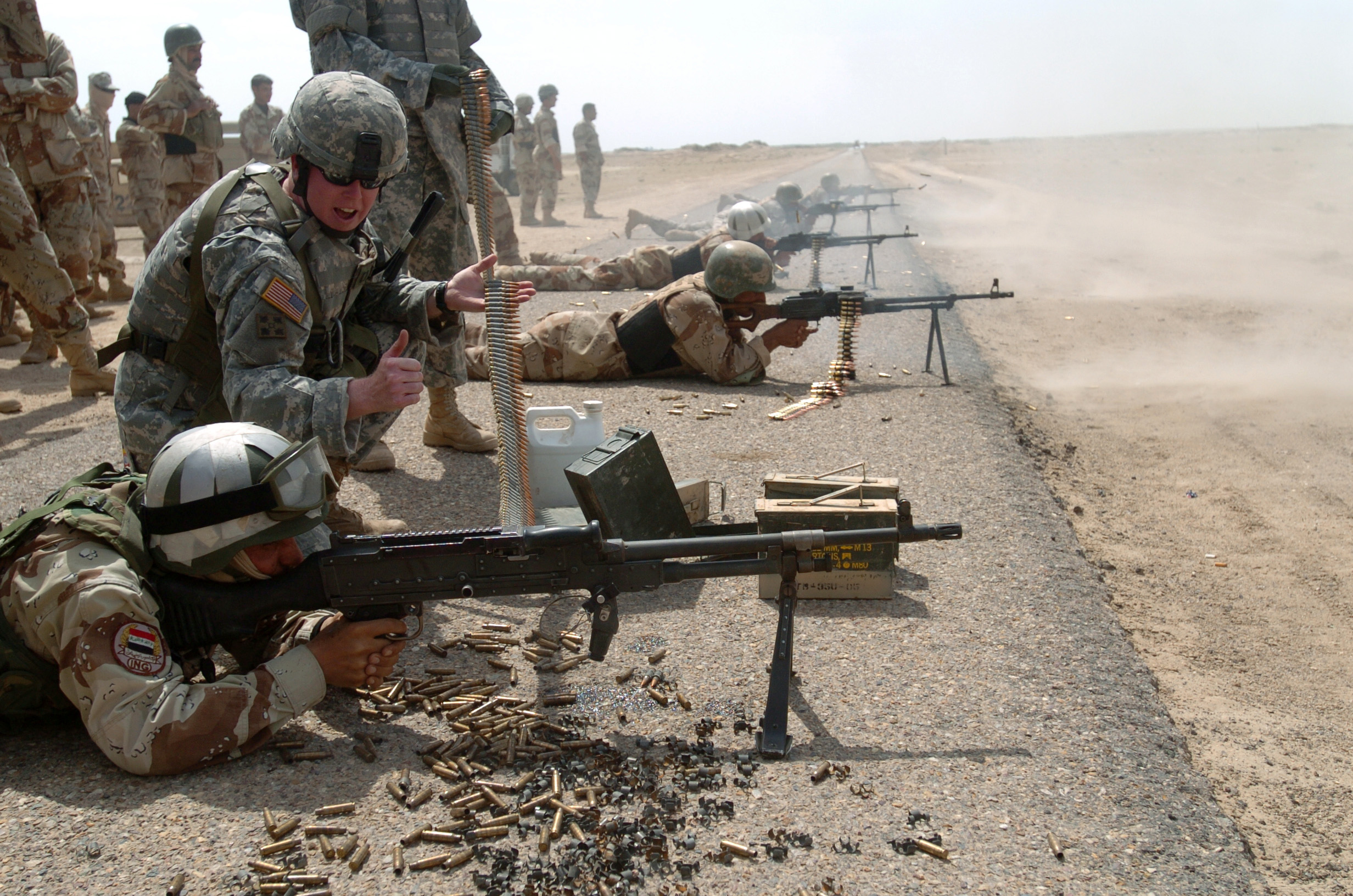
American M240G (foreground) and an Iraqi PKM (background)

The term "medium machine gun" is used to refer to the ubiquitous full-power rifle-caliber machine gun design. When capable of being used for flexible purposes (such as mounting on a pintle mount, bipod, tripod, coaxial turret, or aircraft fixed gun), they are categorized as general-purpose machine guns.

Most have provisions for quick-change barrels and the ability to be fired from a bipod, tripod, or pintle mount, and weigh between 20-30 pounds. Modern Western MMG/GPMG weapons almost always fire 7.62×51mm full-power rifle ammunition; modern Eastern MMG/GPMG weapons usually fire 7.62×54mmR full-power rifle ammunition with a rimmed cartridge.

For example, the US Army and Marines now use the FN MAG (as the M240 machine gun), which is generally called the "M240 medium machine gun". It was originally adopted for vehicle mounting in the late 1970s, but its higher reliability resulted in the infantry adopting it for use over the M60 machine gun, despite it being several pounds heavier. They both have quick-detachable barrels, bipods in their light infantry model, tripod and pintle mount options for other models, and similar weight and size. Both the M240 and the M60 are considered GPMGs and MMGs and were employed on a variety of aircraft and vehicles as well as by dismounted personnel; however when dismounted the M60 was typically issued as a squad-level weapon (in lieu of a squad automatic weapon or light machine gun) while the M240 remained a platoon-level asset located in the platoon's weapon's squad, with the M249 SAW being used at the squad level as a LMG/SAW.

== See also ==
- Automatic rifle
- General-purpose machine gun
- Heavy machine gun
- Light machine gun
- Squad automatic weapon
- Submachine gun
- Coaxial machine gun
