= Fiat-Revelli machine gun =

FIAT-Revelli machine gun can refer to:

- Fiat-Revelli Modello 1914
- Fiat-Revelli Modello 1935
