= 8×59mm Rb Breda =

Machine gun cartridge

8×59mmRb Breda
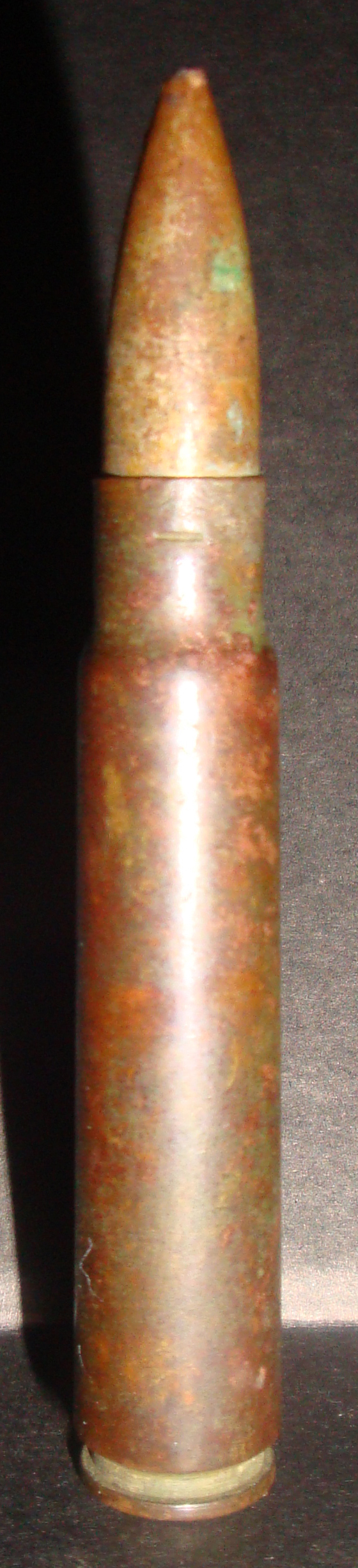
- A Breda cartridge discovered buried in the ground
- Type: Machine gun
- Place of origin: Italy, Kingdom of Italy

Service history
- In service: 1935–1960s
- Used by: Italy, Portugal
- Wars: World War II; Portuguese Colonial War

Production history
- Designed: 1935
- Produced: 1935–1960s

Specifications
- Parent case: unknown
- Case type: rebated rim, bottleneck
- Bullet diameter: 8.36 mm (0.329 in)
- Land diameter: 8.0 mm (0.31 in)
- Neck diameter: 9.14 mm (0.360 in)
- Shoulder diameter: 10.80 mm (0.425 in)
- Base diameter: 12.49 mm (0.492 in)
- Rim diameter: 11.92 mm (0.469 in)
- Rim thickness: 1.40 mm (0.055 in)
- Case length: 58.84 mm (2.317 in)
- Overall length: 80.44 mm (3.167 in)
- Rifling twist: 240 or 245 mm
- Primer type: large rifle
- Maximum pressure: 3150 atm 46,300 psi

Ballistic performance
Bullet mass/type	Velocity	Energy
13 g (201 gr)	790 m/s (2,600 ft/s)	4,057 J (2,992 ft⋅lbf)
13.4 g (207 gr) Ball mod. 35	750 m/s (2,500 ft/s)	3,768 J (2,779 ft⋅lbf)
12.57 g (194 gr) AP mod. 39	790 m/s (2,600 ft/s)	3,950 J (2,910 ft⋅lbf)

8×59mmRb Breda was an Italian heavy arms cartridge. It is unusual in that it is one of the small number of cartridges designed with a rebated rim, meaning the rim of the cartridge is smaller in diameter than the body of the cartridge. The "Rb" in the designation stands for "rebated rim".

== History and Usage ==
8×59mmRB Breda was a caliber created for use by the Royal Italian Army in World War II. The cartridge was originally designed for use in anti-aircraft heavy machine guns like the Breda M37, Breda M38, and Fiat–Revelli Modello 1935. It was also used in the experimental Pavesi M42 semi-automatic rifle. It was introduced in 1935 but is no longer in production today.

Italy manufactured ammunition during the brief period the Breda machine guns were in Italian service.
Albania manufactured ammunition after World War Two to use in Italian machine guns they captured during World War 2.

== See also ==
- List of rebated rim cartridges
