= AMO-F-15 =

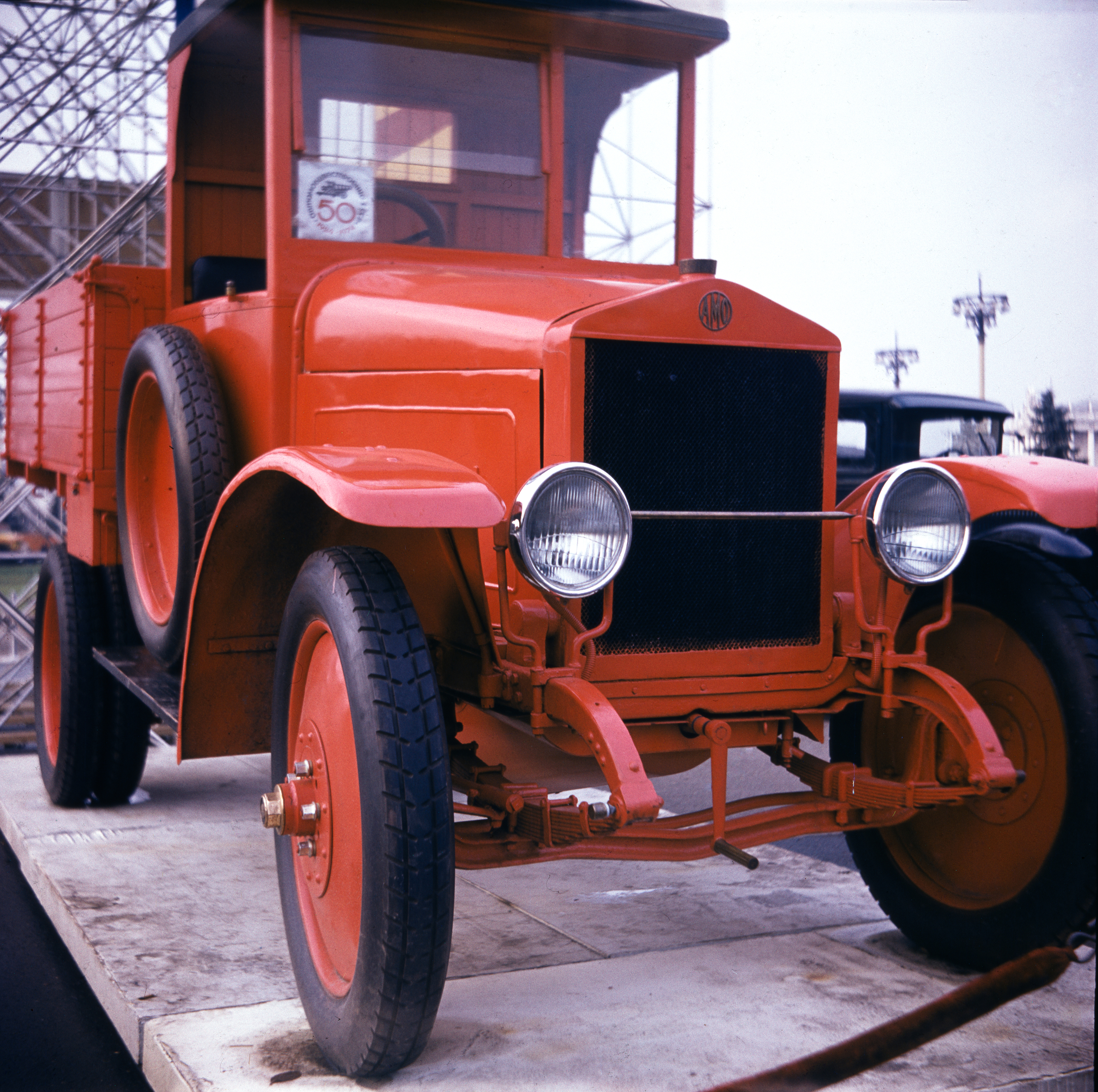

Overview
- Manufacturer: AMO
- Production: 1924-1931/1932
- Assembly: Russia: Moscow

Body and chassis
- Class: truck
- Layout: Front engine layout, 4×2

Powertrain
- Engine: I4, 4396 ccm, 26 kW
- Transmission: 4-speed manual

Chronology
- Successor: AMO-2

The AMO-F-15 was a light truck based on the Italian Fiat 15Ter made at the AMO-plant in Moscow in the Soviet Union from the mid-1920s. It was the first Soviet truck to be produced in the first series, with a total of more than 6,000 units made between 1924 and 1931. Different models were built based on the vehicle: flatbed trucks, omnibuses, fire engines, ambulances and armored versions for the military.

== History ==
Produced under licence, the production of the truck was originally meant to begin shortly after the October Revolution in 1917. Because of the events of the First World War, AMO initially had to limit itself to assembling components purchased from Fiat. Independent series production of the AMO-F-15, which was a replica of the Fiat F-15, did not begin until 1924.

Various changes were made to the vehicle over the course of the production history. Between 1925 and 1926 the shape of the radiator changed, since 1927 there was a new shape of the fenders and a fixed canopy. In 1928, an electrical lighting system and a horn were installed for the first time; In 1930 the steering wheel was moved to the left.

Up to 1931, 6,285 trucks were produced, 3,227 of them in the penultimate year of production. From 1930 a new truck type was produced with the AMO-2 and in October 1931 with the appearance of the AMO-3 the production of the AMO-F-15 was stopped.

== Models and variants ==
Six variants were manufactured:

- The AMO-F-15 was the basic version and was delivered as a flatbed truck.
- With a bus body, the vehicle was produced from 1926 and was equipped with seats for 14 passengers.
- A fire engine from 1927.
- An armored version was produced for the military from 1928 under the name BA-27. 215 copies were built.
- Also for the military in 1927, nine AMO-F-15s with a top and a car body were manufactured. They served as staff vehicles for high-ranking Red Army officers.
- An ambulance version of the vehicle had been available since 1925.

== Specifications ==
The following technical data apply to the version with a flatbed.

- displacement: 4396 cm^{3}
- power: 35 HP
- bore / stroke: 100 mm / 140 mm
- length over all: 5050 mm
- width: 1760 mm
- height: 2250 mm
- wheelbase: 3070 mm
- ground clearance: 225 mm
- transmission: 4-speed gearshift
- vehicle lighting: gas-fired, electric from 1928
- empty weight: 2050 kg
- payload: 1500 kg
- total weight: 3550 kg
- tire dimension: 885 × 185 mm
- top speed: 50 km/h
- fuel consumption: 28 L/100 km
- tank capacity: 70 L
- maximum negotiable slope: 12°
- maximum slope that can be driven on: 10°
- wading depth: 600 mm
- layout: 4×2
