= Fiat–Revelli Modello 1935 =

Italian medium machine gun

Mitragliatrice Fiat Mod.1935
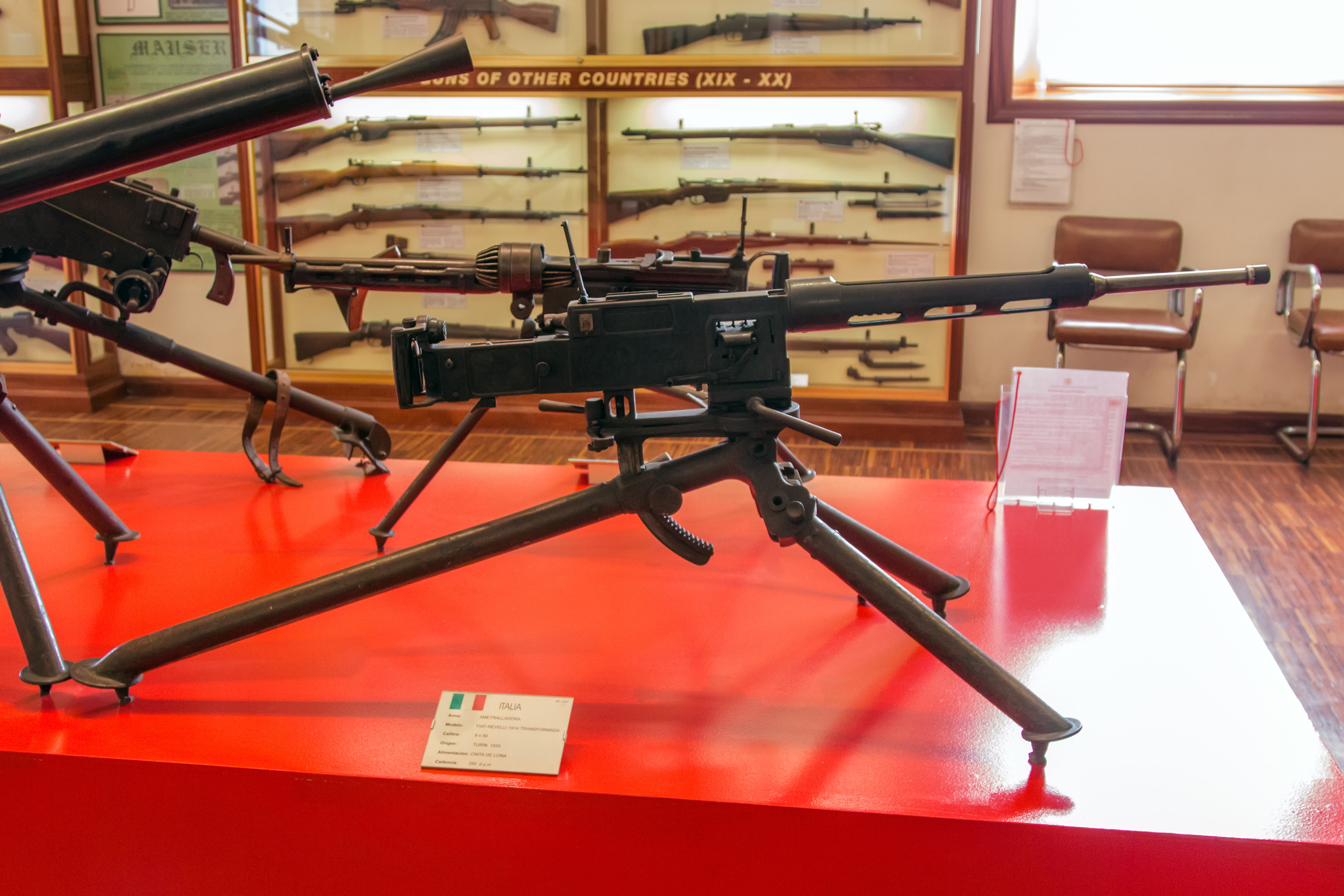
- A Fiat Mod.35, mounted on its tripod.
- Type: Medium machine gun
- Place of origin: Italy

Service history
- In service: 1935–1945
- Used by: Kingdom of Italy
- Wars: Spanish Civil War; World War II

Production history
- Designed: 1934
- Manufacturer: M.B.T. (Metallurgica Bresciana già Tempini)
- Developed from: Fiat Mod.14
- Produced: 1935–1943

Specifications
- Mass: 40.8 kg (89.95 lb) (Total weight): Gun: 17.8 kg (39.24 lb); Tripod: 23 kg (50.71 lb)
- Length: 1,265 mm (49.8 in)
- Barrel length: 650 mm (25.59 in)
- Shell: 8×59mm Rb Breda
- Action: Short recoil
- Carriage: Tripod
- Rate of fire: Theoretical: 600 rounds/min
- Muzzle velocity: 750 m/s (2,460 ft/s)
- Effective firing range: 1,000 m (1,090 yd)
- Maximum firing range: 5,200 m (5,690 yd)
- Feed system: 50-round belt
- Sights: Front Blade; Adjustable Rear Leaf

The Fiat Modello 1935 or Fiat Modello 14/35, frequently shortened in Fiat Mod.35 or just Fiat 35, was an Italian machine gun, a modified version of the Fiat Mod.1914, which had equipped the Italian Army of World War I. It was a vast improvement on the early model: offering superior penetration power due to the adoption of belt fed 8mm (8×59) rounds, a quick-change barrel and the removal of the water jacket and water pump. During the service life the gun was still found to be relatively prone to jamming and dust. Despite its faults the Mod.35 saw extensive action during World War II. After the Italian Armistice the guns captured by the Germans were renamed 8 mm Schweres Maschinengewehr 255(i).

== Overview ==
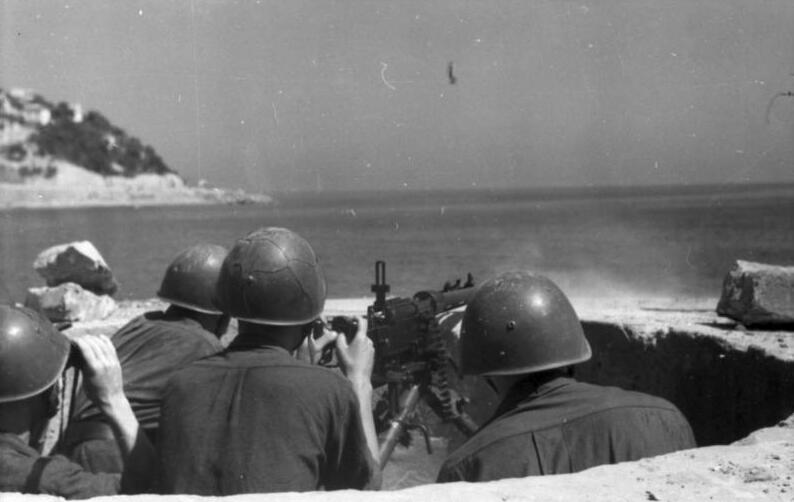
Italian soldiers firing a Fiat Mod.35.

The Fiat Mod. 1914 had seen widespread use during World War I, but its flaws (Note: The Fiat–Revelli Modello 14 was heavy and cumbersome, being a water-cooled machine gun and its use of the underpowered 6.5×52mm Carcano.) became more and more apparent as time passed.

Since 1926 the Italian Army felt the need for a machine gun with a caliber larger than the 6.5 mm and since 1928 started experimentations with Fiat Mod.14 machine guns modified in various calibers: 8 mm, 7.92 mm and 7.65 mm. In the meantime (1931) the Army started also a competition for a completely new machine gun in 8-7.92 mm caliber. After the final adoption of the new 8 mm cartridge in 1933 the Regio Esercito pursued both with the experimentation of modified Fiat Mod.14 and with the competition for the new machine gun, these came to an end in 1935 with the adoption of the Fiat Mod.35 for the modified gun and in 1937 with the Breda Mod.37 for the new gun.

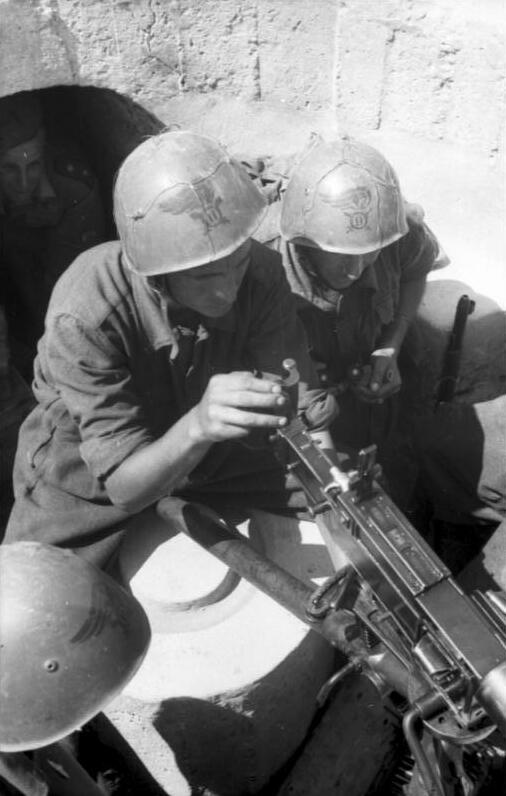
Italian soldiers aiming a Fiat Mod.35.

The Mod.35 opted for a more conventional belt feed, air-cooling, rechambering for the 8x59mm RB Breda. Also, the machine gun was prone to the cook-off of the chambered rounds during the pauses of firing.

The gun has an overall length of 1650 mm, including its 650 mm barrel. Unloaded, the gun weighs 17.8 kg, while the tripod weighed 23 kg. Like the Mod.14, the Mod.35 is a complete weapon system made up of the machine gun unit, the tripod mounting assembly and ammunition supply, and therefore required a multi-person crew to operate.

The rechambering to the 8mm calibre and the adoption of a belt feed succeeded in improving both the stopping power and the rate of fire of the machine-gun; however, it reportedly suffered from jammings rather often.

There is unsubstantiated data (frequently reported in English-language texts and websites) about the Mod.35 using an integrated oil pump to lube the ammo, and that such device was inherited by the previous Fiat Mod.14. Such a device was never implemented in either machinegun, but it was recommended in the gun manuals to slightly lube each round before inserting it in the Mod.14 box magazine or in the Mod.35 belts, in order to facilitate extraction and cycling.

== Use on vehicles ==
Lancia 1ZM
Installed on some units to replace the previous Fiat Mod.14.
Fiat-Terni Tripoli
Installed for a short time to replace the previous Fiat Mod.14.
Fiat 3000
Installed in a twin mount to replace the previous SIA Mod.18.
CV 33
Installed in a twin mount to replace the previous Fiat Mod.14 Avio.
CV 35
Installed in a twin mount.
Fiat 1100 C.M.
Installed in a twin anti-aircraft mount.
T17E1 Staghound
On the Staghounds used by the Italian Police the Browning M1919 placed in the hull was replaced with a Fiat Mod.35.

== See also ==
- Breda M37
