= Fiat 15 =

Italian truck

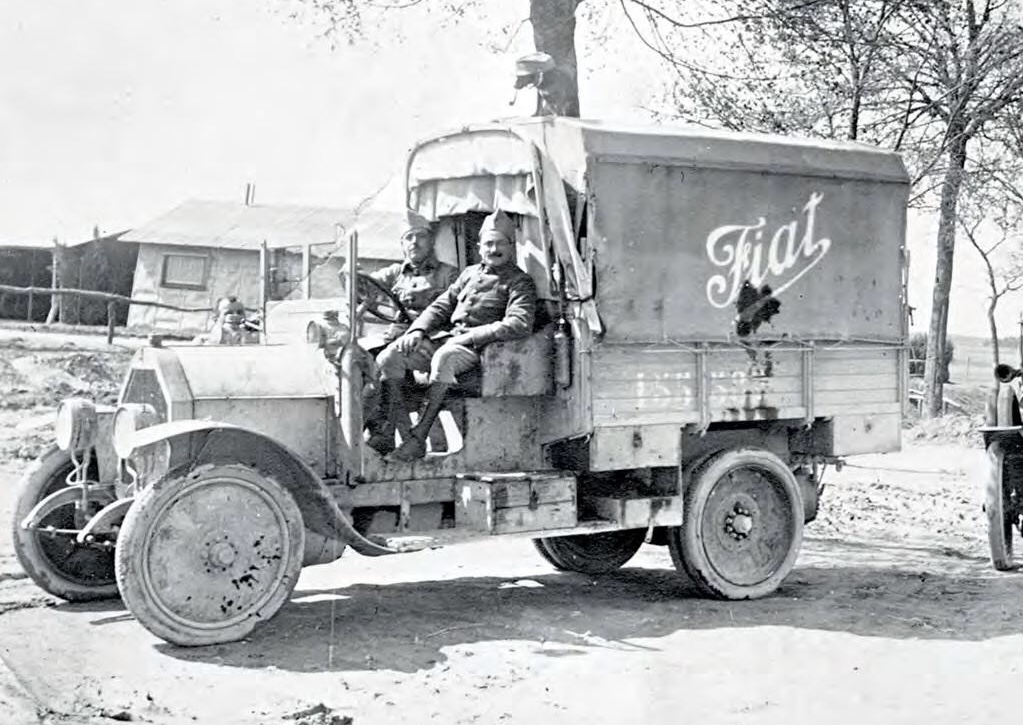
- Fiat 15 Ter in French Army service during the First World War
- Type: Light truck
- Place of origin: Italy

Service history
- Used by: Italy, France, British Empire & United States
- Wars: Italo-Turkish War & First World War

Production history
- Designer: Carlo Cavalli
- Manufacturer: Fiat Veicoli Industriali
- Produced: 1911–1922
- No. built: 26,714
- Variants: AMO-F-15 (additional 6,285 built)

Specifications (Fiat 15 Ter)
- Length: 4.57 m (15 ft) overall 3.05 m (10 ft) wheelbase
- Width: 1.74 m (5 ft 9 in)
- Crew: Two seats
- Engine: Fiat 53A; 4,398 cc (268.4 cu in); 4-cylinder inline petrol 40 bhp (30 kW) at 1800rpm
- Payload capacity: 1.5 t (30 cwt, 1.65 short tons)
- Drive: Rear wheel
- Transmission: 4-speed
- Suspension: Leaf springs
- Maximum speed: 58 km/h (36 mph)
- References: Gosling

The Fiat Tipo 15 is a light military truck produced by Fiat Veicoli Industriali. Introduced in 1911, the Tipo 15 was used by the Royal Italian Army in the Italo-Turkish War and in the First World War. It was also produced in the Soviet Union as the AMO F-15.

== Creation and design ==
In 1909, the Royal Italian Army requested a light multi-role truck to transport personnel and materials. Designed by Carlo Cavalli, the Fiat Veicoli Industriali presented the Fiat 15. This new model inaugurates a technical novelty on this type of vehicle: the fuel pump replacing a gravity feed.

The truck entered military service in 1911 as the Fiat 15 bis and was heavily utilized in the Italo-Turkish War. It was nicknamed "Libya", because it was intended for use in this colony. Subsequently, in 1913, the Fiat 15 Ter, equipped with a more powerful engine, was introduced.

During the First World War, its production for the armed forces was joined by that of the Fiat 18.

The chassis of the civilian truck was also namely used for the preparation of buses and fire engines for the civic firefighters. From 1918, an armored car, called Fiat Terni and based on the Fiat 15 Ter truck chassis, was developed and exclusively used in Libya, earning it the name Fiat Terni-Tripoli.

== Technology ==
The Fiat 15 chassis is mounted on four-spoke wheels, at the front and back. The engine on the Fiat 15 is a 3,053 cm^{3} (186.3 cu in) four-cylinder petrol Fiat Brevetti 15/20 unit, innovative at the time due to the presence of a fuel pump instead of relying on gravity feed. The Fiat 15 bis maintains the same engine, while the Fiat 15 ter is fitted with a more powerful 4,398 cm^{3} (268.4 cu in) Fiat 53A petrol engine (Note: The top speed increased from 35 to 40 km/h (22 to 25 mph)) and steel disc wheels.

== Military use ==
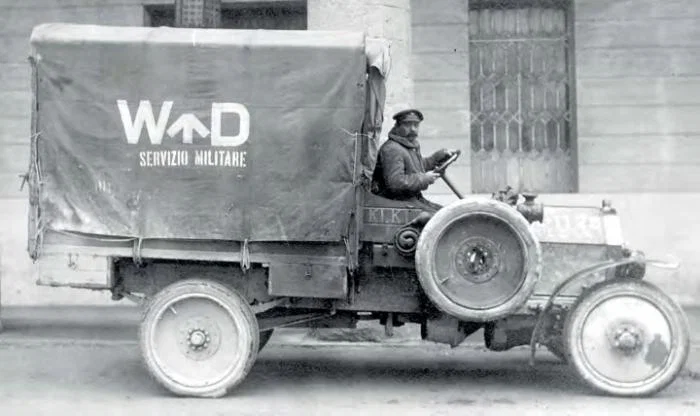
Fiat 15 Ter in British Army service during the First World War

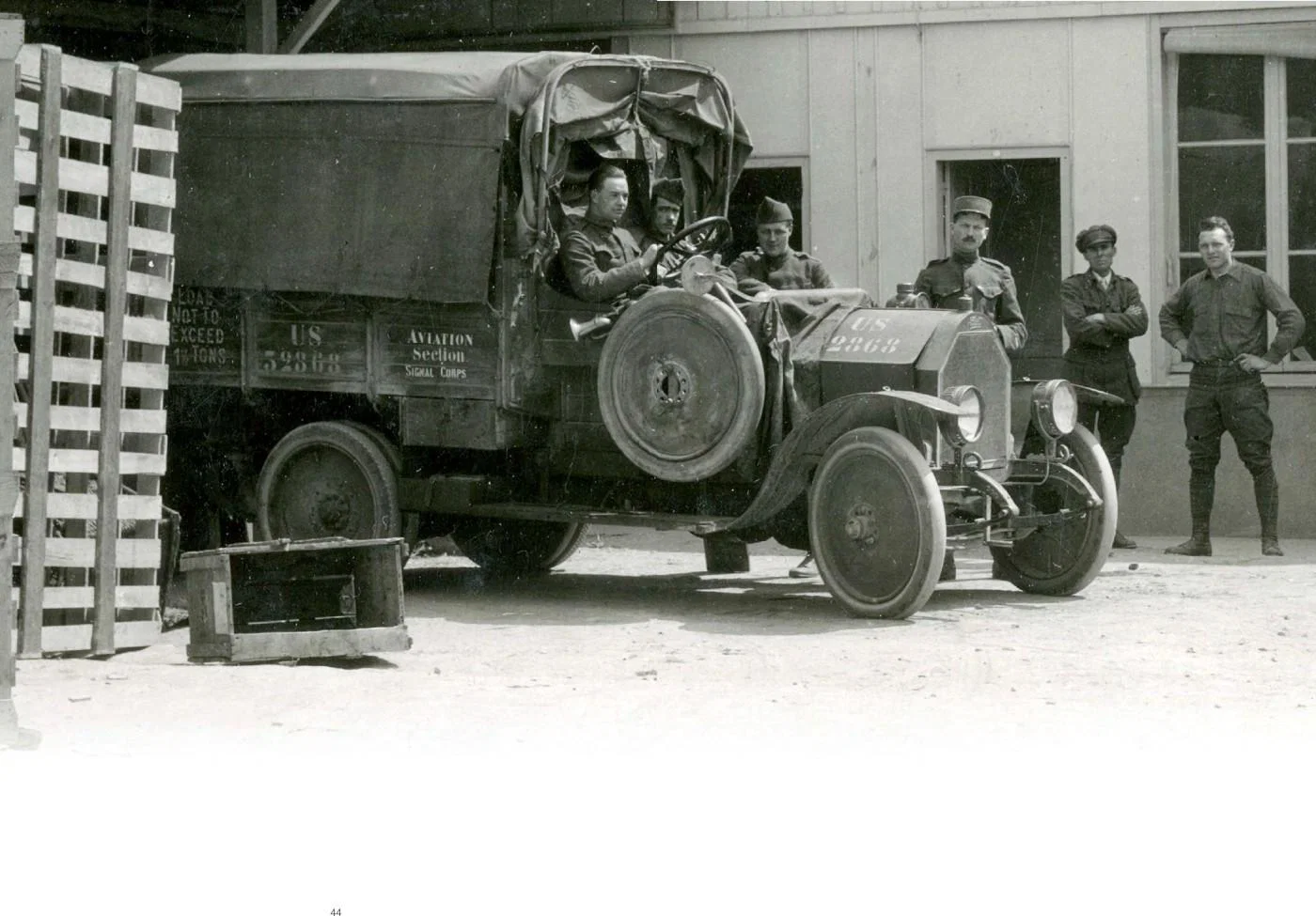
Fiat 15 Ter in service with the American Expeditionary Forces

=== Italy ===
The Fiat 15 was the stalwart of the first motorization of the Italian armed forces and the Royal Army acquired all versions of the truck in many configurations, including ambulance, garage, and fire engine. Alongside its use as a logistic means, Italy was the first country to use the motor vehicle directly in combat.

In fact, the Fiat 15 bis was used as the basis for the construction of the armored car Fiat Arsenale, used in the Italo-Turkish war together with the Bianchi. After the Great War, the Fiat-Terni Tripoli bus was produced on the chassis of the Fiat 15 ter by the steel mills of Terni. During this campaign, the squadrons were also motorized with numerous Fiat 15 ter trucks (defined at the time as "tanks"), protected with armored metal plates and armed with three Schwarzlose machine guns with 15,000 rounds, conducted by a crew of four men.

In 1918, the Italian army counted 8,206 Fiat 15 trucks in its ranks, including 710 in sanitary version.

=== France ===
In 1907, the French Ministry of War had decided to reserve its orders to national manufacturers only. But in October 1914, it was realized that national production could not satisfy the needs of the French Army; 2,585 vehicles were delivered by the French national manufacturers in 1914. As such, foreign designs were pursued by the French government to fulfill its remaining vehicle deficit, and the Fiat 15 and 18 trucks were supplied by Fiat to serve in the French Army throughout the First World War.

A first order for 500 units of the Fiat 15 came through in December 1914, followed by a second order for 600 vehicles in January 1915. On 30 June 1915, there were 635 Fiat 15 trucks in service with the French Army. On 31 May 1918, 839 trucks were assigned to aviation squadrons.

=== Other countries ===
The Fiat 15 Ter was used by several other armies during the First World War. The United Kingdom obtained 386 trucks, while the United States received only 200, despite an order for 4,000 units.

Many copies were also delivered to Russia; 1,319 trucks were assembled at the AMO factory in Moscow between 1917 and 1919 with parts supplied by Fiat. The Fiat 15 Ter was then manufactured under license by AMO under the name of AMO F-15, with 6,285 trucks built between 1924 and 1931.

== Technical features ==
Model	Type	Years of production	Motor type	Displacement (cm³)	Power	PTC (in tons)
Fiat 15/20 HP Base "Brevetti Tipo 2"	Frame	1909–1910	Fiat Brevetti 15/20	3,053 cm^{3} (186.3 cu in)	16 hp (12 kW)	1.2
Fiat Tipo 15	Chassis, Bus	1911–1912	Fiat Brevetti 15/20	3,053 cm^{3} (186.3 cu in)	20 hp (15 kW)	2.5
Fiat Tipo 15 bis	Truck, Chassis, Bus, Ambulance	1912–1913	Fiat 15/20 HP	3,053 cm^{3} (186.3 cu in)	20 hp (15 kW)	3.1
Fiat Tipo 15 Ter	Truck, Chassis, Bus, Ambulance	1913–1922	Fiat 53A	4,398 cm^{3} (268.4 cu in)	40 hp (30 kW)	3.95
Fiat Tipo 15 Ter – Military	Truck, Chassis, Bus, Ambulance	1913–1922	Fiat 53A	4,398 cm^{3} (268.4 cu in)	36 hp (27 kW)	3.75
AMO-ZIL F-15	Manufactured in Russia under license (Fiat 15 Ter)	1924–1931	Fiat 53A	4,398 cm^{3} (268.4 cu in)	40 hp (30 kW)	4.0
Fiat Bertone Type 15 Ter	Bus	1921–1922	Fiat 53A	4,398 cm^{3} (268.4 cu in)	40 hp (30 kW)	3.95
Fiat 502F	Truck, chassis	1923–1926	Fiat 101	1,460 cm^{3} (89 cu in)	23 hp (17 kW)	2.07

The total production in Italy of the Fiat 15 Bis and 15 Ter models between 1911 and 1922 was 26,714 units. There is no data regarding the production of the civilian base version 15.
