= Fiat-Terni Tripoli =

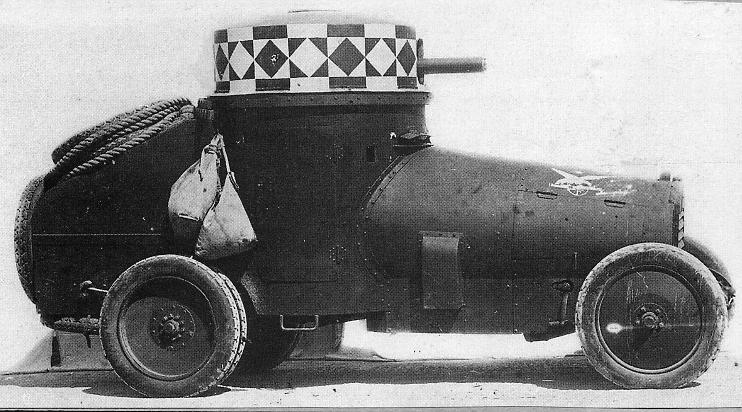
- Type: Armored car
- Place of origin: Italy

Service history
- In service: 1918-1942
- Used by: Royal Italian Army
- Wars: World War II

Production history
- Designed: 1918
- Manufacturer: Odero-Terni-Orlando
- Produced: 1918
- No. built: 14

Specifications
- Mass: 1,400 kg
- Length: 4.54 m
- length: 123 mm (4.8 in)
- Width: 1.7 m
- Height: 1.8 m
- Crew: 4 (driver, co-driver/commander, gunner, loader)
- Armor: 6 mm
- Main armament: Fiat–Revelli Modello 1914
- Engine: Fiat 53A; 36 hp at 1600 rpm
- Power/weight: 25.71 hp/t
- Operational range: 300 km
- Maximum speed: 65 km/h

The Fiat-Terni Tripoli, also known as the Terni armored car, Fiat Terni, Fiat Tripoli, and Fiat Libia, was an armored car used in the colonial theater by the Royal Italian Army during the Interwar period and World War II.

== History ==
The Tripoli was created in the OTO (Livorno) Steelworks of Terni in 1918, but the Italian front (World War I) wasn't compatible with armored cars due to terrain and the vehicle was instead destined for use in the Italian colonies. A first batch of 12 armored cars was sent to Libya, where the Royal Corps of Colonial Troops of Italian Cyrenaica and that of Italian Tripolitania were engaged in the reconquest of territories lost during the Italo-Turkish War. The Tripoli, together with the Lancia 1Z and the Fiat 15b armored trucks, equipped the armored car squadrons of the III and IV African Hunters Battalion. The Tripoli continued to be employed in colonial policing duties until the mid-1930s, by which time it had been outnumbered and outclassed so was relegated to reserve status. The outbreak of the Second World War caught the Royal Army short of motorized vehicles, so much so that the armored bodies of 6-8 surviving Tripoli were installed on the chassis of Fiat-SPA 38R trucks. The turrets were open at the top and 12.7 mm Breda-SAFAT machine guns scavenged from discarded aircraft were installed in place of the 6.5 mm Fiat–Revelli Modello 1914 machineguns. These vehicles were assigned anti-aircraft duties for the "Babini" special armored brigade, established on November 25, 1940, but all were lost in the initial months of the North African campaign.

== Design ==
The Tripoli was based on the armored version of the Fiat 15 (15b). Compared to the Lanzcia 1Z, the Tripoli is lighter and more agile. It was rear-wheel drive in a 2x4 layout, with the steerable front axle having two steel disc wheels and the fixed rear axle having four.

The armored bodywork was made of 6 mm cold steel, with a vertical cylindrical driving compartment equipped with two side doors and armored vision slits for the drivers. The horizontal front engine compartment featured a truncated cone armored hood, with side hatches for access to the engine and grille protected by sheet metal flaps. A spare tire was carried on the rear storage compartment. Above the driving compartment was a 360 degree, two-man, revolving turret.
