= Milizia Coloniale =

Former Italian all-volunteer colonial militia

The Milizia Coloniale was an all-volunteer colonial militia composed of members of the Fascist Milizia Volontaria per la Sicurezza Nazionale ("Volunteer Militia for National Security") or MVSN, commonly called the "Blackshirts". It is considered unique in modern Italian military history, with its reputation matched only by the pre-unification paramilitary forces Redshirts.

The Milizia Coloniale was formed by Benito Mussolini in 1923. Its organization was based on the "action squads" he introduced in 1919 to counter communists and quash his enemies within the National Fascist Party. The militia organization had special branches that performed police functions covering infrastructure, postal services, and borders. For instance, there are Special Blackshirt units tasked with coastal defense. Based in Italian North Africa and Italian East Africa, the milizia coloniale recruited initially among Italian colonists, but later also among local Africans. By December 1931, the recruits reached 399,000.

The Milizia Coloniale saw action during the Italian invasion of Ethiopia in 1936 where 83 battalions were deployed. The colonial militia units involved in this campaign consisted seven legions (legioni):

- First Legion – Addis Ababa, Ethiopia
- Second Legion – Asmara, Eritrea
- Third Legion – Gondar, Ethiopia
- Fourth Legion – Massawa, Eritrea
- Fifth Legion – Mogadishu, Somaliland
- Sixth Legion – Jimma, Ethiopia
- Seventh Legion – Dessie, Ethiopia

Units from Italian East Africa were formed into the Africa Division, which was a light infantry division and was later destroyed in combat during the East African campaign. Forty six legions were also mobilized in World War II, with each legion serving under one Italian Army division. All remaining legions were destroyed during the Western Desert campaign during World War II.
