= Breda M37 =

Mitragliatrice Breda cal. 8 mod. 37
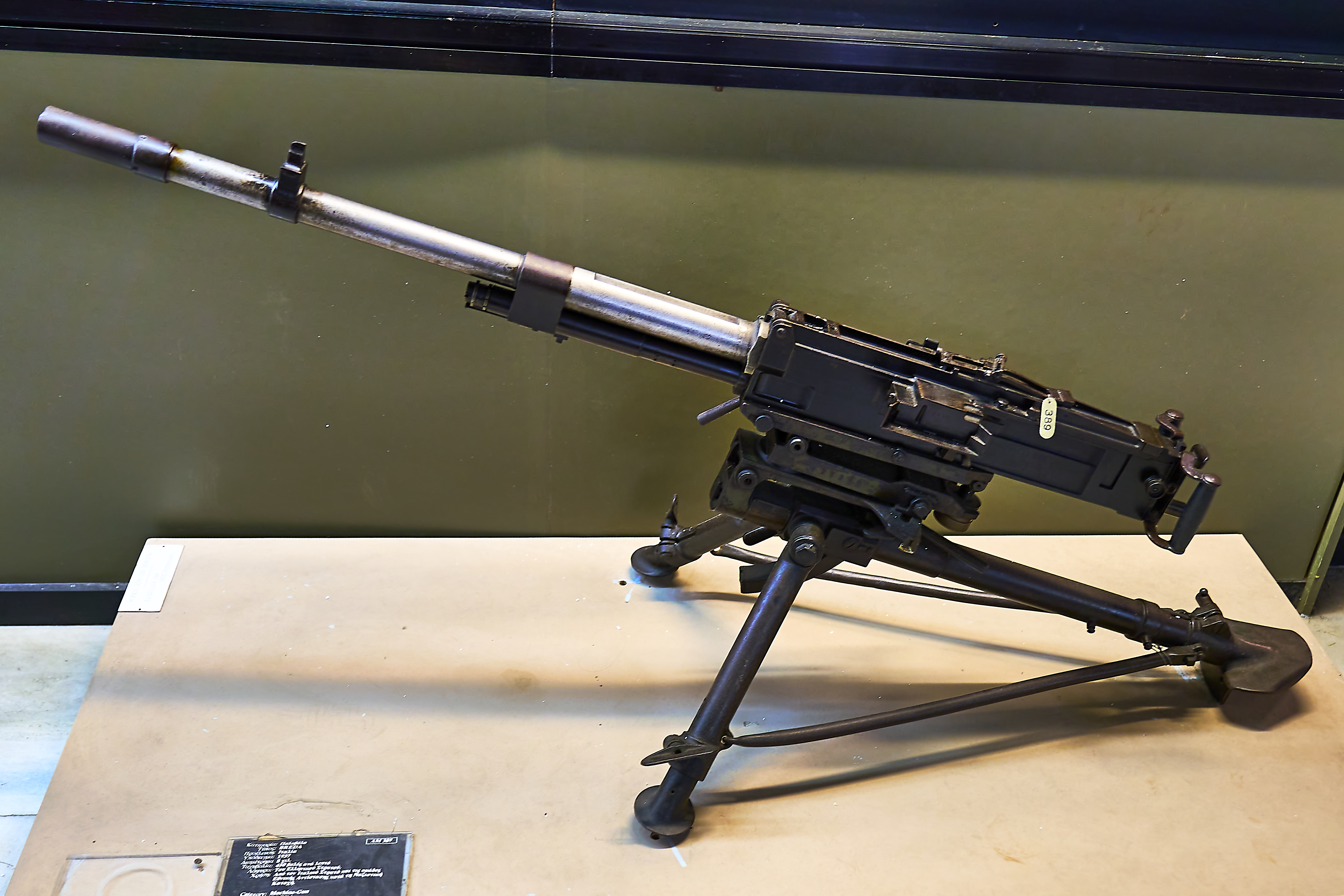
- On display at the Athens War Museum
- Type: Heavy machine gun
- Place of origin: Kingdom of Italy

Service history
- In service: 1937−1960s
- Used by: See Users
- Wars: Spanish Civil War; World War II; Portuguese Colonial War

Production history
- Designed: 1935−1937
- Manufacturer: Società Italiana Ernesto Breda
- Produced: 1937−1945
- Variants: See Variants

Specifications (Mod. 37)
- Mass: 19.4 kg (43 lb) (gun); 18.8 kg (41 lb) (tripod)
- Length: 1,270 mm (50 in)
- Cartridge: 8×59mm Rb Breda
- Action: Gas-operated
- Rate of fire: 450 rpm (cyclic); 200 rpm (practical)
- Muzzle velocity: 800 m/s (2,600 ft/s)
- Effective firing range: 800–1,000 m (870–1,090 yd)
- Feed system: 20-round strip
- Sights: Tangent, graduated up to 3,000 m (3,300 yd)

The Mitragliatrice Breda calibro 8 modello 37 (commonly known as the Breda mod. 37 or simply Breda 37/M37 and also just M37) was an Italian heavy machine gun produced by Breda and adopted in 1937 by the Royal Italian Army. It was the standard heavy machine gun for the Royal Italian Army during World War II, and continued to be used by the Italian Army after the conflict. Post-war, it was also used during the early stages of the Portuguese Colonial War until it was replaced by the MG42/59. The M37 remained in service or kept in strategic storage with a handful of African countries until the late 1980s.

The weapon was also adopted by the Marines and Blackshirt militia. Some guns were also supplied to Nationalist forces during the Spanish Civil War and to Italian-trained Ustaše troops during WWII.

== Design and operation ==
The Breda M37 is a downscaled version of the 13.2 mm Breda M31, (Note: Clifford erroneously stated that it was derived from the problematic Breda 30.) since the latter was considered too large to fit into the tankettes used by the Royal Italian Army. The M37 retains the same rising block breech-locking system of its predecessor, but its fed with 20-round metal strips, similar to the ones used by the Hotchkiss machine gun. Development of the gun faced some delays since the 8×59mm Rb Breda cartridge was not approved until 1935. Ultimately, it took two more years for the machine gun to finally appear.

The strips were inserted into the left side of the gun and the gas-piston driven bolt removed a cartridge from the strip, fed it to the chamber, fired it and put the spent cartridge case back into the strip, which then moved one notch to the right to restart the cycle until the last round was fired. Then the strip was ejected on the right side of the gun as the machine gunner's assistant loaded a fresh ammunition strip. Like the Hotchkiss, continuous fire required the assistant to feed one strip after another while the gunner kept the trigger pulled. M37 crews had a crank-operated machine to remove the spent cases from the strips and load them with fresh cartridges. These devices also had a hopper to store spent cases. The barrels had an expected service life of 20,000 rounds each, and they had to be changed every 400 rounds fired to cool down.

The cartridges didn't need to be oiled, (Note: Several sources stated that the M37 was fitted with an oiler, while Pignato stated that while the ammunition didn't need oiling, the gun itself needed to be lubricated.) though the use of 20-round ammunition strips limited the rate of fire to about 200 rounds per minute (the weapon was air-cooled, so it could not be continuously fired anyway). Rugged and accurate, It was popular with its crews despite the weight of 38 kg (83 lb) with the tripod (it was heavier than the British Bren and the German MG 42), and the low rate of fire, specially when compared to the machine guns used by the Germans. (Note: The MG 42 had a rate of fire between 900 and 1200 rounds per minute.)

According to Hobart, the gun was originally intended to be mounted on tanks and having the spent cases reinserted into the strips instead of scattering around the floor would prevent the crews from slipping on them; while Ian V. Hogg's explanation is that tanks built during the 1930s had a lot of operating mechanisms exposed inside the hull, and having a ejected cartridge case finding its way to this machinery could result into mechanical breakdowns, though he also notes that the tank-mounted Breda 38 used a bag to collect spent cartridges instead; Another suggestion is that this feature was included for economical reasons, allowing spent cartridges to be reused and saving strategic metals. Regardless of the actual reason, it ultimately proved to be impractical on the battlefield.

== Variants ==
- Breda 37 − Original version. Post-war attempts to rechamber the gun to fire the 7.62×51mm NATO cartridge were unsuccessful
- Breda 38 − Vehicle-mounted variant, it was fed from a top-mounted box magazine, fitted with a heavier barrel and a pistol grip. Officially designated as the Mitragliatrice Breda cal. 8 mod. 38 per carri armati

== Service use ==
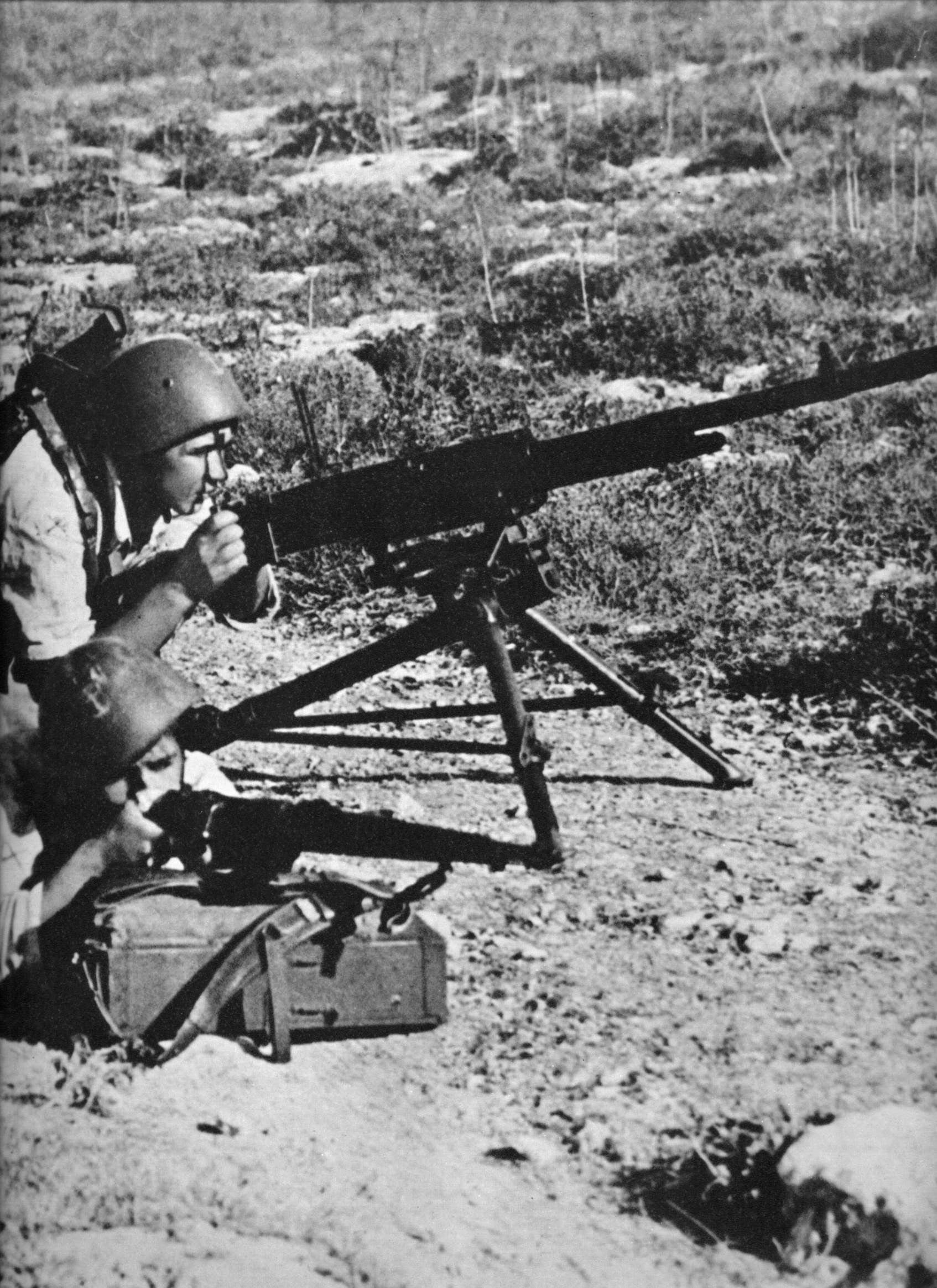
Italian marines' M37 during the Battle of Crete

The Breda 37 was supposed to replace the Fiat–Revelli Modello 1935, but the latter remained in use during the campaigns in North Africa and the Balkans. Every Italian machine gun section had 2 non-commissioned officers, 16 privates, and 2 Breda 37s or Fiat 35s. Each squad had a commander, a machine gunner, the gunner's assistant, 2 soldiers to carry the tripod, 2 soldiers to carry the spare parts, and 2 soldiers to carry the ammunition.

Besides the Army, the Breda was also issued to the Blackshirt militia and Marines (such as the Decima Flottiglia MAS). In North Africa, the M37 was mounted on SPA-Viberti AS.42 reconnaissance cars to improve mobility. Each vehicle carried up to three guns which could be dismounted if necessary.

During the late stages of the Spanish Civil War, Italy supplied the Nationalist forces with about 2,500 guns. During World War II, Italian-trained Ustaše troops were also supplied with Bredas. In the North African campaign the British made wide use of captured M37s, particularly with its Long Range Desert Groups (LRDG). After the Italians surrendered to the Allies in 1943, production of the Breda continued in the Italian Social Republic to supply its German allies, who gave the M37 the designation 8 mm sMG 259(i), while the M38 was designated as the 8 mm Kpfw.MG 350(i). It was also adopted by the Portuguese armed forces, who placed it into service as the Metralhadora m/938. The Breda saw extensive service in Portugal's African colonies during the early stages of the Portuguese Colonial Wars.

During the post-war period, the reformed Italian Army kept the M37 in use until the 1960s. Attempts to convert the Breda to chamber and fire the 7.62×51mm NATO were unsuccessful and it was eventually replaced by the MG42/59. The gun would remain in service or kept in strategic storage with a few African nations, including Somalia, Libya, and Chad (Note: The People's Armed Forces, a Chadian insurgent group that opposed the rule of president Hissène Habré, was supported by Libya.) until the late 1980s.

== Gallery ==
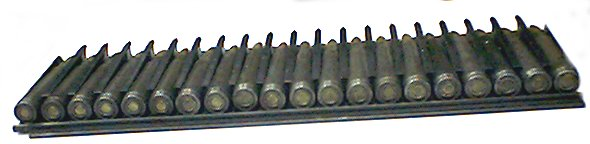
A 20-round ammuntion strip

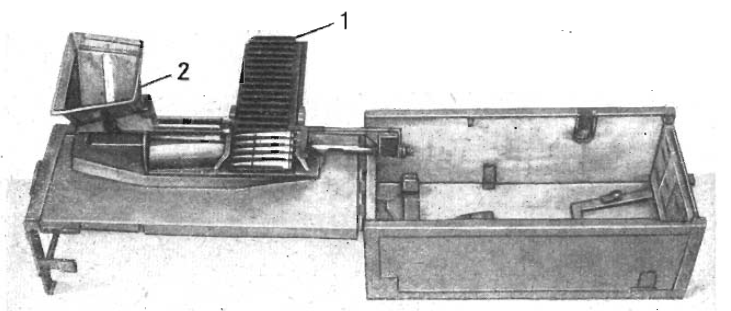
A device to remove spent cases from the ammo strips and replace them with fresh cartridges

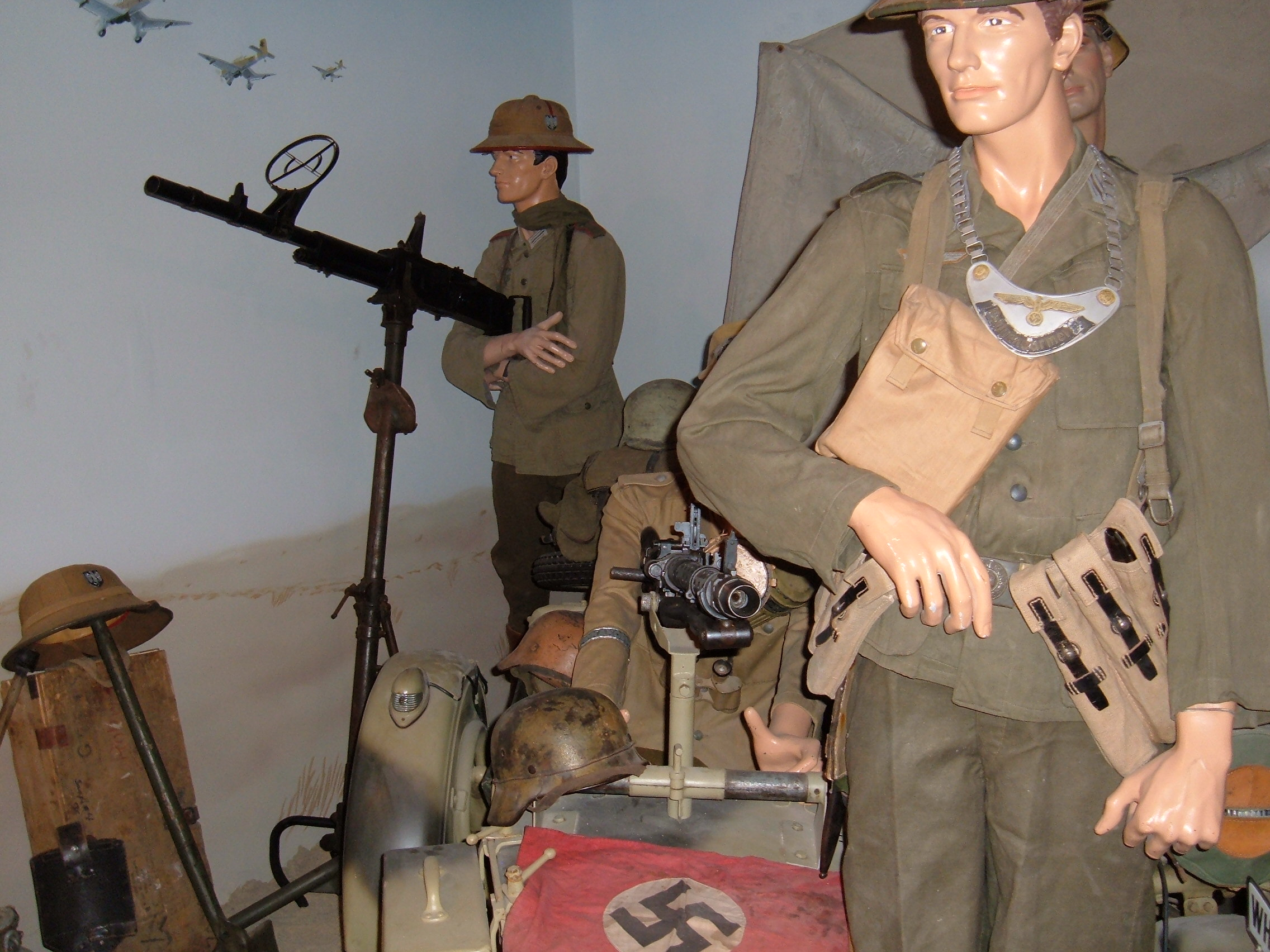
A M37 mounted in an anti-aircraft tripod at a museum in Petaluma, California

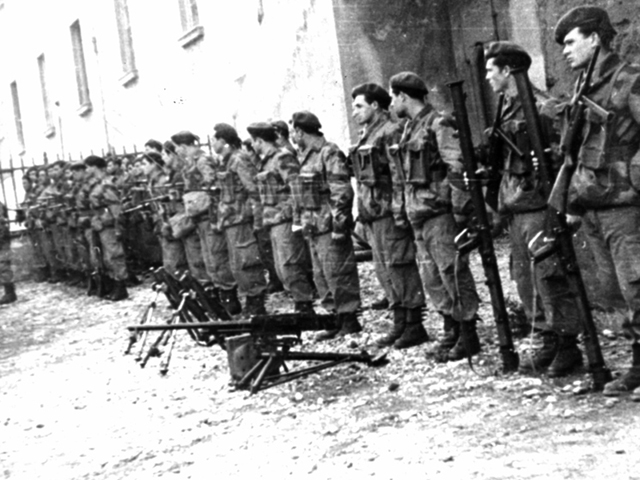
Italian Army soldiers with a M37 ready for training, 1952

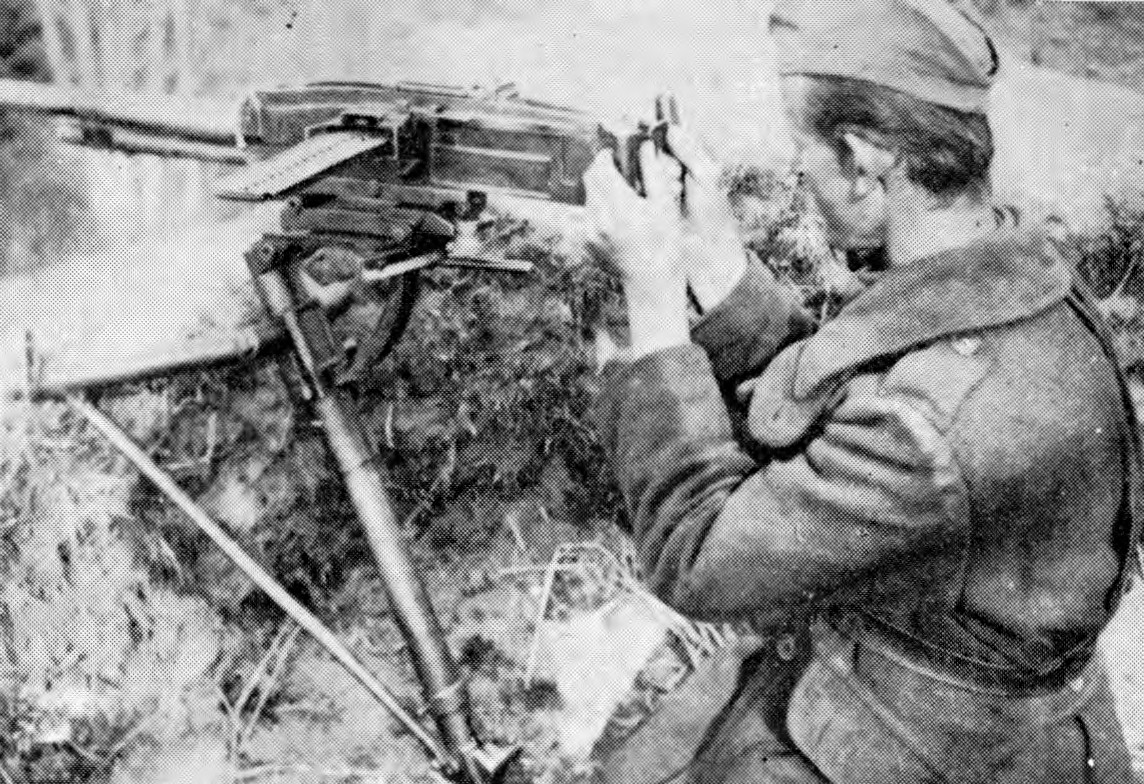
A Breda 37 operated by a Slovene partisan

== Users ==
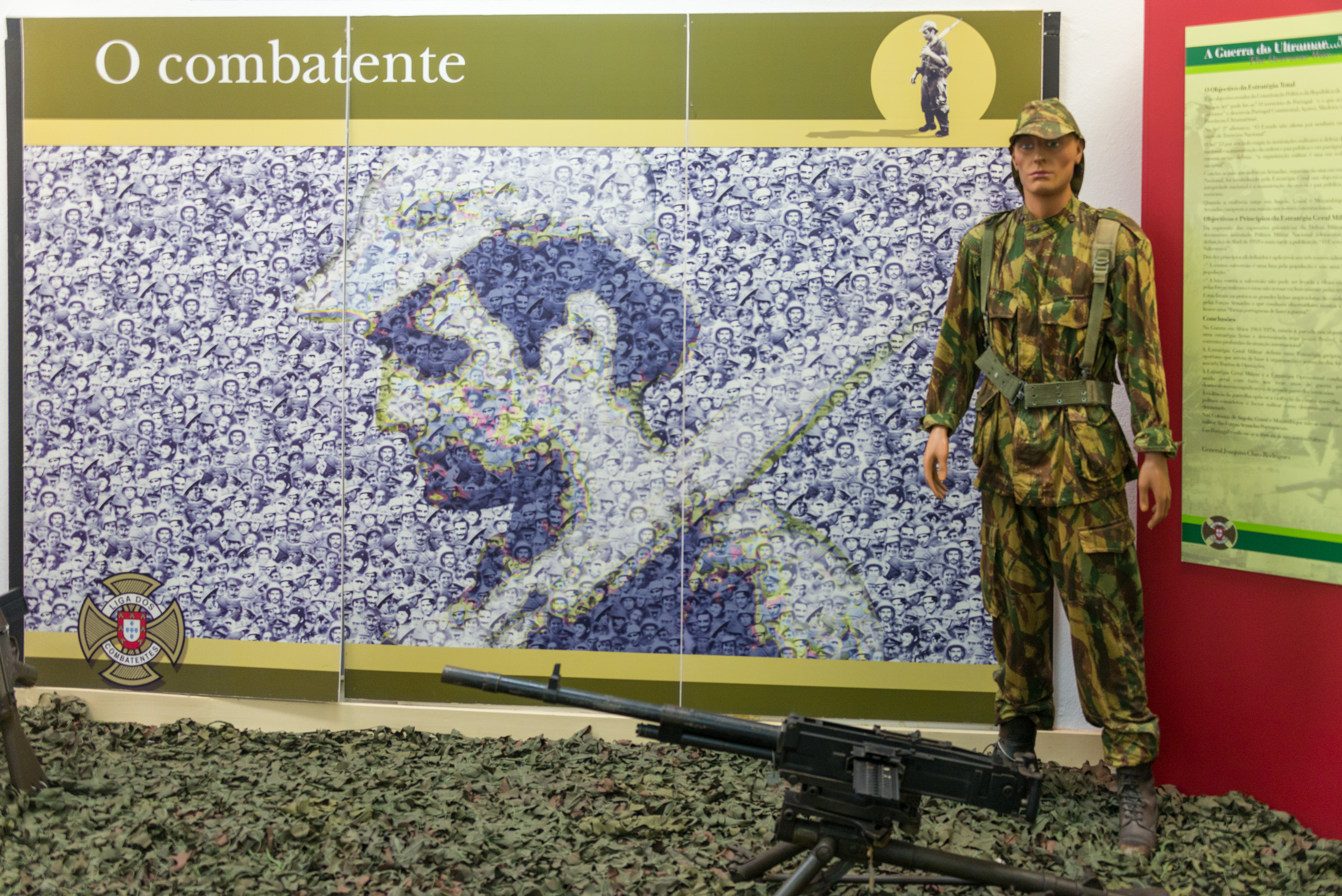
An m/938 Breda in a museum in Lisbon

- British Empire − Captured Model 37 and 38 guns were used by the LRDG
- Chad − Used as late as 1988
- Croatia
- Ethiopia
- Nazi Germany − Captured guns were designated as the 8 mm sMG 259(i)
- Greece − Captured, used by the EDES
- Kingdom of Italy
- Italian Social Republic
- Italy − Replaced by the MG42/59
- Libya − Some guns were possibly kept in reserve as late as 1988
- Portugal − Designated as the m/938, replaced by the MG42/59
- Somalia − Remained in use as late as 1987
- Spain − Approximately 2,500 were delivered during the Spanish Civil War
