= Fiat–Revelli Modello 1914 =

Mitragliatrice FIAT Modello 1914
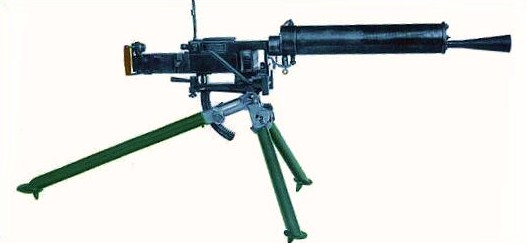
- Type: Heavy machine gun
- Place of origin: Italy

Service history
- In service: 1914–1945
- Used by: See § Users
- Wars: List of conflicts: World War I; Vlora War; 2^{nd} Italo-Ethiopian War; Spanish Civil War; World War II

Production history
- Designer: Abiel Bethel Revelli
- Manufacturer: FIAT Metallurgica Bresciana già Tempini
- Produced: 1914–1919
- No. built: ~37,500

Specifications
- Mass: 43.4 kg (95.68 lb) (fully loaded): Gun: 17 kg (37.48 lb); Water: 3 kg (6.61 lb); Tripod: 22.4 kg (49.38 lb)
- Length: 1,180 mm (46.46 in)
- Barrel length: 654 mm (25.75 in)
- Cartridge: 6.5×52mm Carcano
- Action: Short recoil
- Rate of fire: Cyclic: 200–500 rounds/min; Practical: 250 rounds/min
- Muzzle velocity: 660–680 m/s (2,170–2,230 ft/s)
- Effective firing range: 1,000 m (1,100 yd)
- Maximum firing range: 3,000 m (3,300 yd)
- Feed system: 50-round strip-feed box magazine; 100-round strip-feed box magazine

The Mitragliatrice FIAT Modello 1914, often referred to as FIAT-Revelli mod. 1914 was an Italian water-cooled heavy machine gun produced from 1914 to 1919. It was the standard machine-gun of the Italian Army in World War I, and was used in limited numbers into World War II.

== History ==
In 1908, Italian Regio Esercito Colonel Abiel Bethel Revelli patented and presented a brand new machine gun, inspired by his own contemporary-designed Pistola Automatica Mod. 910 overall concept.

The first iteration of this Mitragliatrice Automatica "Revelli" was almost identical to the final Mod. 1914, with just small external differences: it featured a large oval milled aperture on top to expel the spent cases and quickly inspect the chamber and address any magazine issues; it used 100 round box magazines, and instead of a water jacket, it had a fluted heavy barrel to lighten the overall weight to an astounding 12 kg. With a 14 kg very flexible tripod, it was a light machine-gun, especially compared to its contemporaries, weighing (with tripod) around 33-40kg. Cyclist units in particular showed interest for this light gun, as it suited the corps' needs.

The gun was immediately put under trials by the Royal Italian Army, always looking for better machine-guns, since firearm technology at the dawn of the 20th century was evolving at a very fast pace. They had already adopted the Gardner Mod.1886, the Maxim Mod. 1887, Maxim Mod.1906, the Perino Mod. 1908 and would soon experiment with the and the Vickers-Maxim Mod.1911. This first iteration was rejected in 1911, in favour of the Vickers-Maxim Mod. 1911.

Revelli, looking for a manufacturer for his machine-gun concept, sold his patents to FIAT in Turin, starting a decade long collaboration that will generate several other successful gun related products. FIAT, mostly in the Automotive business at the time, immediately set up a production line dedicated to gun production for the trials, in its Villar Perosa facilities. After some updates, the Machine-gun took part at another army trial in Nettuno in June 1913, and despite showing good performances and being cheaper than the Vickers-Maxim, it was again rejected for using a different manual of arms compared to the other machine-gun already in use.

After the Sarajevo assassination and foreseeing the inevitability of war, the Italian Army, with the supply of Vickers-Maxim Machine-guns from the UK interrupted, finally adopted the new machine-gun in November 1914, giving it the official nomenclature of Mitragliatrice FIAT Mod. 1914. The definitive version had several lightening cuts in the receiver, a foldable cover on top of it to protect the case expulsion area, a fixed, ribbed water jacket with an external pump, standard 50 round box magazine, and an improved tripod.

The Italian Army entered the First World War with just 37 FIAT Mod. 14 machine-guns delivered to corps, but the production numbers quickly increased, granting to arm with the new model most machine-guns sections. To help in the rearmament and to ease FIAT's automotive production for the war effort, Metallurgica Bresciana già Tempini intervened since July 1915, taking upon itself part of the Mod. 14 production, with a grand total of about 17,500 machine-guns produced during the war. FIAT instead managed to produce about 20,000 M1914 during the entirety of the conflict.

The Mitragliatrice FIAT Mod. 1914 remained the standard medium/heavy machine-gun of the Italian Army until the adoption of the Breda Mod. 37. Most of these machine-guns got updated in late 1930s to the Mod. 1935 configuration.

== Operation ==
Despite its similarity to the Maxim design in overall appearance (the typical water-cooling jacket and tripod), its internal mechanism was entirely different.

As with the M1910 pistol, the gun works on short recoil and unlocking the bolt via locking wedge. The force needed to unlock the wedge is regulated by a leverageable pin positioned in the wedge' pivotal point, and can be set to three positions: Meno (Less), Più (More) and midway between these two. Positioning the lever on Più, the wedge gets slightly higher, offering more resistance to the bolt and absorbing more recoil. On the Meno position, the wedge is slightly lower, offering less resistance and absorbing less recoil. This helped in offering more or less recoil force from the fired bullet, in order to cycle the gun reliably with different batches of ammo, different magazines and different environmental issues.

There were several out of battery safety preventive measures in the mechanism, in order to avoid feeding and faulty ammunition issues as much as possible.

The water jacket, whose exterior changed from ribbed to smooth during the war, is notable for having two bottom drain plugs in addition to the top filling plug. One of the bottom drain relieves steam pressure into a condenser (a standard feature), and the other allows users to manually pump condensed water back into the jacket for reuse.

The gun was chambered for the 6.5×52mm Carcano, which eased logistics (as it was the same cartridge of the Carcano rifle) but made it somewhat underpowered compared to most of its contemporaries. The gun itself weighed 17 kg (37.48 lb), while the tripod weighed 22.4 kg (49.38 lb).

Another feature was the presence of a select-fire switch, which allowed for the choice between Lento (slow fire, about 200 rounds per minute), Sicura (safety position) and Rapido (fast fire, 500 rounds per minute).

In December 1916 a conical flash hider was devised and patented by Belardo Italo; it got quickly implemented in production, offered complimentary by MBT.

=== Magazine ===
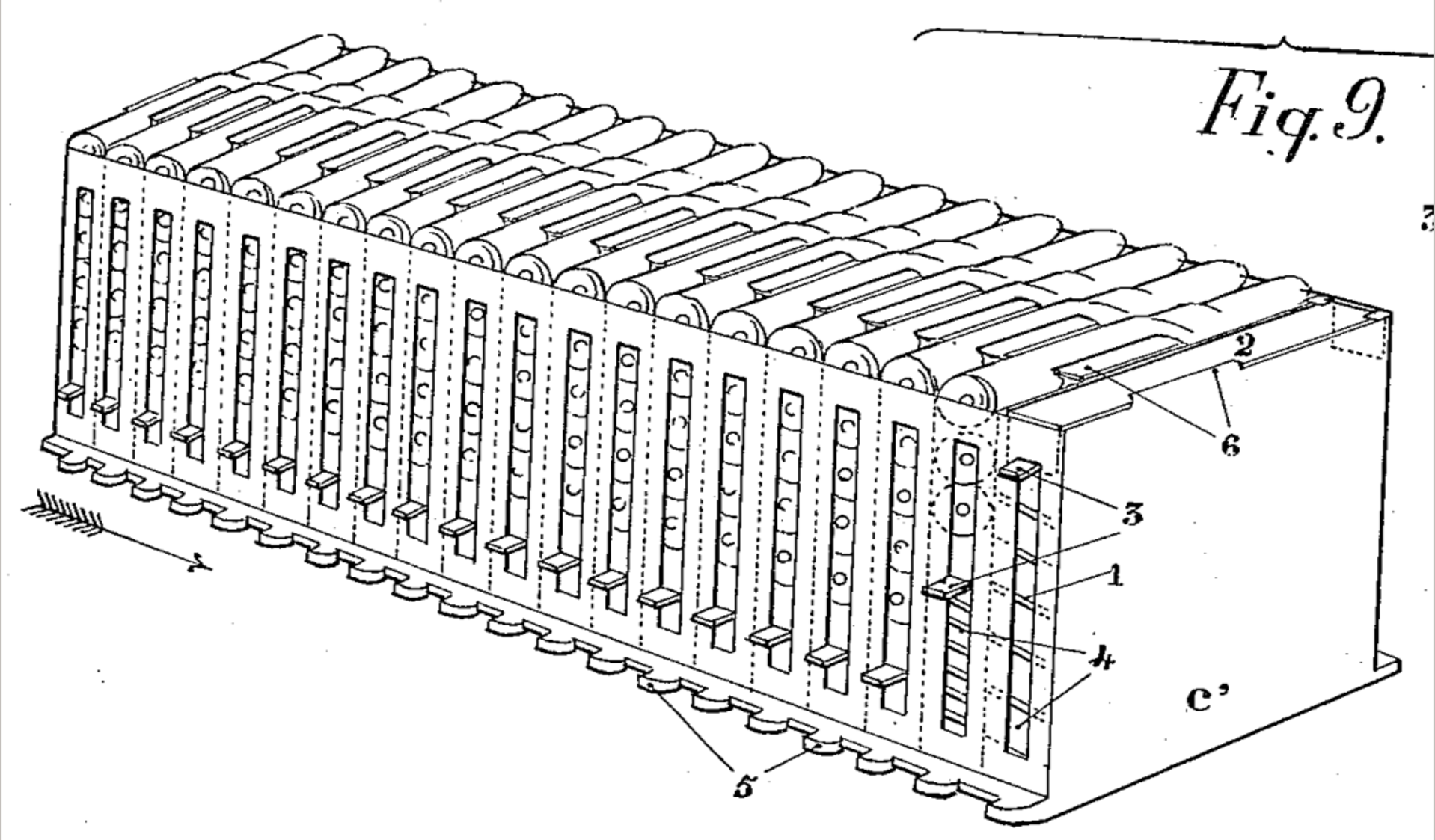
FIAT-Revelli M1914 magazine

The FIAT Modello 1914 utilized a distinctive multi-column strip-feed box magazine (sometimes called a "mouse cage" magazine). Available in 50- or 100-round capacities, this magazine was divided into 10 or 20 separate columns, respectively. Each column held five rounds, kept under pressure by a springed follower. The gun could be loaded one round at a time, or quickly using several special tools that inserted cartridges into five columns simultaneously.

The magazine is inserted in the gun from the left, and begins firing from its first column on the right. After the column is exhausted and the follower reach the top, the mag is mechanically pulled inward to index and present the next column of ammunition. This column-by-column feeding sequence continues until the final column is fired, at which point the spent magazine drops out of the right side of the weapon, ready for replacement.

Despite being a fairly compact magazine, it suffered from its flimsy construction, prone to dents and hence to failures, and for its lack of compatibility with other weapons.

In June 1917 there were experimentations with a circular 250 circular magazine, but trials revealed reliability issues since it couldn't be supported from the bottom. The gun mechanisms didn't have enough force to keep up the weight of such a bulky and unsupported magazine and to cycle it reliably at the same time. The 100 round magazine had the same issues, that was solved on Aircraft mounted machine-guns by adding a base plate to support the weight of the magazine and facilitate its cycling.

The magazine system was changed in the 1935 update to a belt system and it wasn't used by any other Italian ordnance.

== Variants ==
- Mitragliatrice Automatica "Revelli", Mitragliatrice Automatica "Revelli-FIAT" Mod. 1910

Early version, without water jacket, with a floating, fluted heavy barrel. Production of prototypes for trial was soon overtaken by FIAT.

- Mitragliatrice FIAT Mod. 1914 con refrigerante

Standard Infantry version with water jacket. The most produced, widespread and the most known in popular culture.

- Mitragliatrice FIAT Mod. 1914 con canna ad alette e supporto Aviatori

Aviation variant, with perforated heat shield and heavy fluted barrel. It was designed to swivel and be used to defend the airplane from the front or from the rear, depending on the plane model.

== Further development ==
While some sources suggest the gun featured a cartridge-oiling system, the official weapon manual makes no mention of it, nor any standard production gun shows it. It appears that only a brief 1930 iteration of the weapon may have included such a system.

The machine-gun saw some use within armored vehicles, such as the Ansaldo Light Tank Prototype 1931, a precursor to the L3/33 tankette.

It was developed into the FIAT–Revelli Modello 1935.

=== Users ===
- Austria-Hungary
- Germany
- Italy
- Albania
- Yugoslavia

== See also ==
- Breda M37
- FIAT–Revelli Modello 1935

== Bibliography ==
- Jowett, Philip (25 April 2000). The Italian Army 1940-45 (1): Europe 1940-43. Bloomsbury Publishing. ISBN 9781855328648.
- Gucci, Luigi (1918). Armi Portatili: Parte I - Generalità sulle Armi Portatili e sugli Esplosivi. Città di Castello.
- Manganoni, Carlo (1930). Caratteristiche di alcune Armi da Fuoco portatili - Testo. Torino: R. Accademia di Artiglieria e Genio.
- Comando 7a Armata (1918). Istruzione sulle mitragliatrici in distribuzione.
- Grandi, Felice (1938). Le Armi e le Artiglierie in Servizio. Torino.
- Popenker, Maxim (27 October 2010). "Modern Firearms: FIAT-Revelli M1914 and M1914/35 machine gun (Italy)". modernfirearms.net. World Guns.
- Esdaile, Charles J. (10 October 2018). The Spanish Civil War: A Military History. Routledge. ISBN 9780429859298.
- Hills, Andrew (20 February 2020). "Ansaldo Light Tank Prototype 1931 - Tanks Encyclopedia". Tank Encyclopedia.
- Poggiaroni, Giulio (29 May 2020). "Fiat–Revelli Modello 1935 History and Specifications". comandosupremo.com.
- Segal, Robert G. (15 August 2023). "FIAT Revelli Modello 1914". Small Arms Defense Journal. 3 (2).
- Montù, Carlo (1948). Storia dell'Artiglieria - Vol. XI. Rome: USSME.
- Revelli, Abiel Bethel (1914). Mitragliatrice Automatica "FIAT". Brescia: Metallurgica Bresciana già Tempini.
