= List of Italian submachine guns =

The Villar Perosa is often technically regarded as the first submachine gun. The Villar Perosa was somewhat odd, and had sort of a heavy double automatic pistol configuration, with two 25-round box magazines feeding each barrel and a rate of fire in excess of 1000 rounds per minute. It was originally intended as an auxiliary aircraft weapon but was removed from airplanes to be replaced by light machine guns using rifle rounds. It saw wide use with ground forces mainly for defensive use when fitted with a protective armored plate. A large quantity was seized by Austrian troops during the Battle of Caporetto. It also aided development of the next Italian submachine guns, the OVP 1918 and the Beretta 1918. It is always claimed that the Beretta beat the Bergman MP18 by a couple of months or a couple of weeks in the field but there is absolutely no trace of its use by the Arditi units who were supposed to have fielded it, unlike the Bergmann MP 18.1 that appears on many pictures and is cited in both German or Allied reports. The Beretta's rate of fire was estimated to be in the 1000 to 1300 rounds per minute range. The small quantity of Beretta 1918 available after World War I was converted as semi auto carbine for the Forestry Service. Since the rate of fire of an SMG can be estimated↑ by its bolt mass and the ratio with the weight of the projectile being fired, the examination of semi auto carbine and 1918/30 samples confirms the rate of fire and explains the reputation of unreliability of these first Beretta submachine guns.

†unless using a system that delays rearward move or forward move: locking rollers, Blish lock, buffer or cyclic rate reducer.

The Beretta 1935 was inspired by the French STA studies led by Section Technique de l'Armée from 1918 to 1938. Many technical details are close to the STA 1922 that was adopted as MAS 1924 and used in post World War I limited colonial conflicts.

Starting with the 1938 A, the Beretta SMG gained a well-deserved reputation of accuracy and reliability. They used the Italian 9 mm model 38, a round much more powerful than the German made 9 mm Parabellum.

- Villar Perosa (1915)
- OVP 1918 (developed in 1918 from the Villar Perosa)
- Beretta Model 1918 (1918)
- Beretta Model 1938A (1938, based on earlier 1935 model)
- Beretta Model 38/42 (1940s, formed basis for model 3)
- TZ-45 (1940s, later produced as BA-52 for the Burmese Army)
- Armaguerra OG-43
- FNAB 43 (1943)
- Variara submachine gun (1944), entirely engineered and produced by Italian partisans
- Franchi LF57 (1957) (original production ended in the 1980s)
- Beretta Model 38 (1950s)
- Beretta M12 (1960s), Beretta Model 12S (1983)
- Spectre M4 (1980s)
- Socimi Type 821 (1980s, later produced as LF821 by Franchi)
- Benelli CB M2
- Beretta Mx4 Storm
- Beretta PMX

Machine pistols:

- Beretta M1951R (1950s)
- Beretta 93R (1970s)
- Beretta 963r

== Other Italian automatic firearms ==
- Breda 30 (6.5mm)
- Mitragliatrice Breda MOD.37
- Beretta MOD.34 Automatic Pistol

== See also ==
- List of submachine guns
- List of firearms
