= Armaguerra OG-43 =

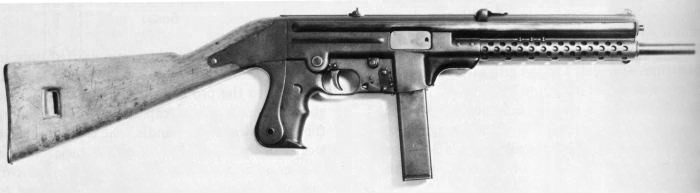
- An OG-44, version of OG-43 with fixed wooden stock
- Type: Submachine gun
- Place of origin: Italy

Service history
- Used by: Italian Social Republic
- Wars: World War II

Production history
- Designer: Giovanni Oliani
- Manufacturer: Società Anonima Revelli Manifattura Armiguerra
- Variants: OG-44

Specifications
- Mass: 3.18 kg
- Length: 720 mm, 470 mm closed stock
- Caliber: 9×19mm Parabellum
- Action: Blowback
- Rate of fire: 500 rounds/min
- Muzzle velocity: ~480 m/s
- Maximum firing range: effective ~150 m max 200 m
- Feed system: 10-, 20-, 30- and 40-round MAB 38 detachable box magazines

The Armaguerra OG-43 (Armaguerra Mitra Oliani Giovanni) and its subsequent version, OG-44, were submachine guns manufactured in small numbers in the Republic of Salo.

== Origins and development ==
The OG-43, designed by Giovanni Oliani in the factory based in Cremona named Società Anonima Revelli Manifattura Armiguerra, was an advanced submachine gun, designed for compactness and ease of mass production. It is part of a family of weapons produced under emergency measures during the time of the Italian Social Republic, which include the TZ-45 machine gun, FNAB-43 and Isotta Fraschini. The next version, the OG-44, instead had a more traditional shape. The Ministry of War of the RSI had approved the construction, but it was never initiated as events unfolded.

== Description ==
The OG-43 sported a very modern design, compared to its contemporaries. The receiver was made of stamped sheet metal, with the magazine serving as a grip. The bulk of the L-shaped bolt, along with the recoil spring, was housed in a cylinder directly above the barrel, which helped reduce muzzle climb when firing. The reciprocating cocking handle was located in the forward section of the bolt housing. The weapon was blowback operated, and fired from an open bolt in both automatic and semi-automatic mode. Adjustable iron sights were fitted, with two possible settings for either 100 m or 200 m. Initially equipped with forward-folding metal stock, later production runs were fitted with simpler, wooden fixed stocks. It used the same double-stack magazines as the Beretta MAB 38, available in 10, 20, 30 or 40 rounds.

=== OG-44 ===
The OG-44 version exhibited more traditional lines. It adopts the traditional wooden stock hinged to the pistol grip, positioned behind the trigger and the magazine well. It was slightly heavier than the OG-43, as well as the total length of 787 mm.

== See also ==
- Fucile Armaguerra Mod. 39
- TZ-45
- FNAB-43

== Sources ==
- Pierangelo Tendas, Armaguerra Cremona OG44
