= M1935 =

M1935 can refer to:

- Beretta M 1935
- Breda M1935 PG Rifle
- M1935 mine, a French anti-tank mine
- a version of the Stahlhelm combat helmet

== See also ==
Modèle 1935 pistol, designation for two French pistols referred to as the M1935A and M1935S
