= Breda gun =

Breda gun may refer to several automatic firearms developed by Società Italiana Ernesto Breda in the 1920s and 1930s, including:

- Breda 20/65 mod.35 (20×138mmB);
- Breda-SAFAT machine gun (12.7x81mmSR or 7.7x56mmR) and;
- Breda 30 (6.5×52mm).
