= Fiat Mod. 1928 =

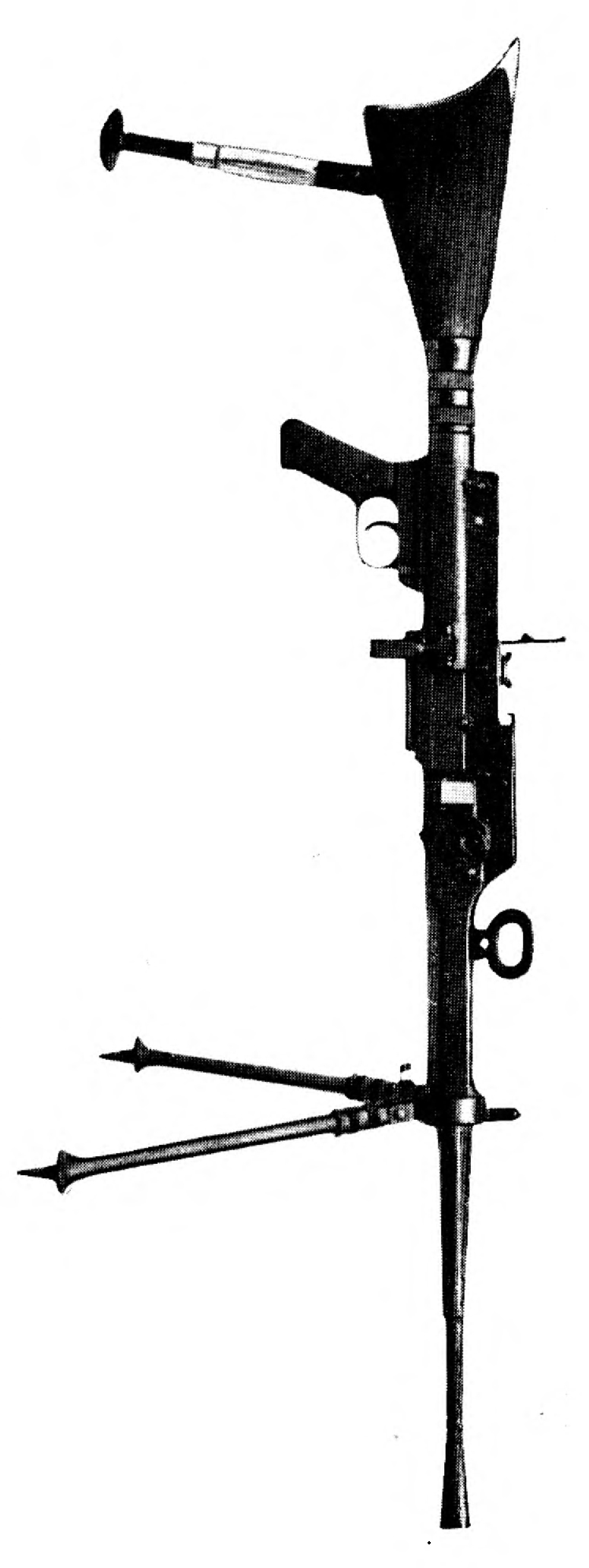
- Fiat Mod. 1928 infantry light machine gun.
- Type: Light Machine gun
- Place of origin: Kingdom of Italy

Service history
- Used by: Kingdom of Italy

Production history
- Designer: Giuseppe Mascarucci
- Manufacturer: SAFAT
- No. built: 700

Specifications
- Mass: 10 kg (22.05 lb)
- Length: 1,180 mm (46.46 in)
- Cartridge: 6.5×52mm (6.5mm Carcano)
- Action: Short recoil
- Rate of fire: 400-450 rounds/min
- Muzzle velocity: 650 m/s (2,130 ft/s)
- Feed system: stripper clips of 20 rounds
- Sights: Iron

The Fiat Mod. 1928, also known as SAFAT mod.28 or Fiat-SAFAT mod.28, was a light machine gun designed in Italy towards the end of the 1920s.

== History ==
The weapon was designed by SAFAT to replace the previous Fiat Mod.26 in the competition for a new light machine gun started by the Regio Esercito since the early 1920s.

The Fiat Mod.28, unlike the Fiat Mod.24 and Fiat Mod.26 that were designed by Revelli, was designed by Giuseppe Mascarucci (the same designer of the Fiat Mod.1928 Avio cal 7.7, a weapon that would later become the much better-known Breda - Mod. SAFAT).

Like the previous weapons, the Fiat Mod.28 was also adopted in small series for practical evaluation by the troops, in this case in direct competition with the Breda 5GF. It demonstrated better performance than the previous Fiat Mod. 26 and Breda 5 C, but despite this, it lost to the Breda 5GF which, after some modifications, won and was adopted with the name Breda Mod.30.

Fiat's defeat in the competition for the light machine gun for the army led to the company's exit from the firearms market for ten years, the closure of SAFAT, and the transfer of the related patents to Breda.

== Design ==
The Fiat Mod.1928 is a short recoil operated gun. The action is the same as the Fiat Mod.1928 Avio (a weapon also designed by Mascarucci and which will become the Breda - Mod. SAFAT) but reversed: block, block pin, connecting rods and barrel spring are positioned above the breech while in the Breda - Mod. SAFAT they are positioned below it. The weapon fires from an open bolt.

The machine gun is air-cooled and the barrel is fluted to increase cooling. The barrel can be quickly replaced when overheated and must be replaced, in full automatic fire, after 300 rounds.

The feeding system is the same as the Fiat Mod.26, a fixed magazine on the left side loaded via 20-round brass stripper clips. Similarly, the magazine is loaded via the ejection port on the right side after the retraction of the bolt.

As in the Fiat Mod.26 and Breda Mod.30, the Fiat Mod.28 also has an oil pump, installed in the upper part of the receiver, for the lubrication of each cartridge before chambering.

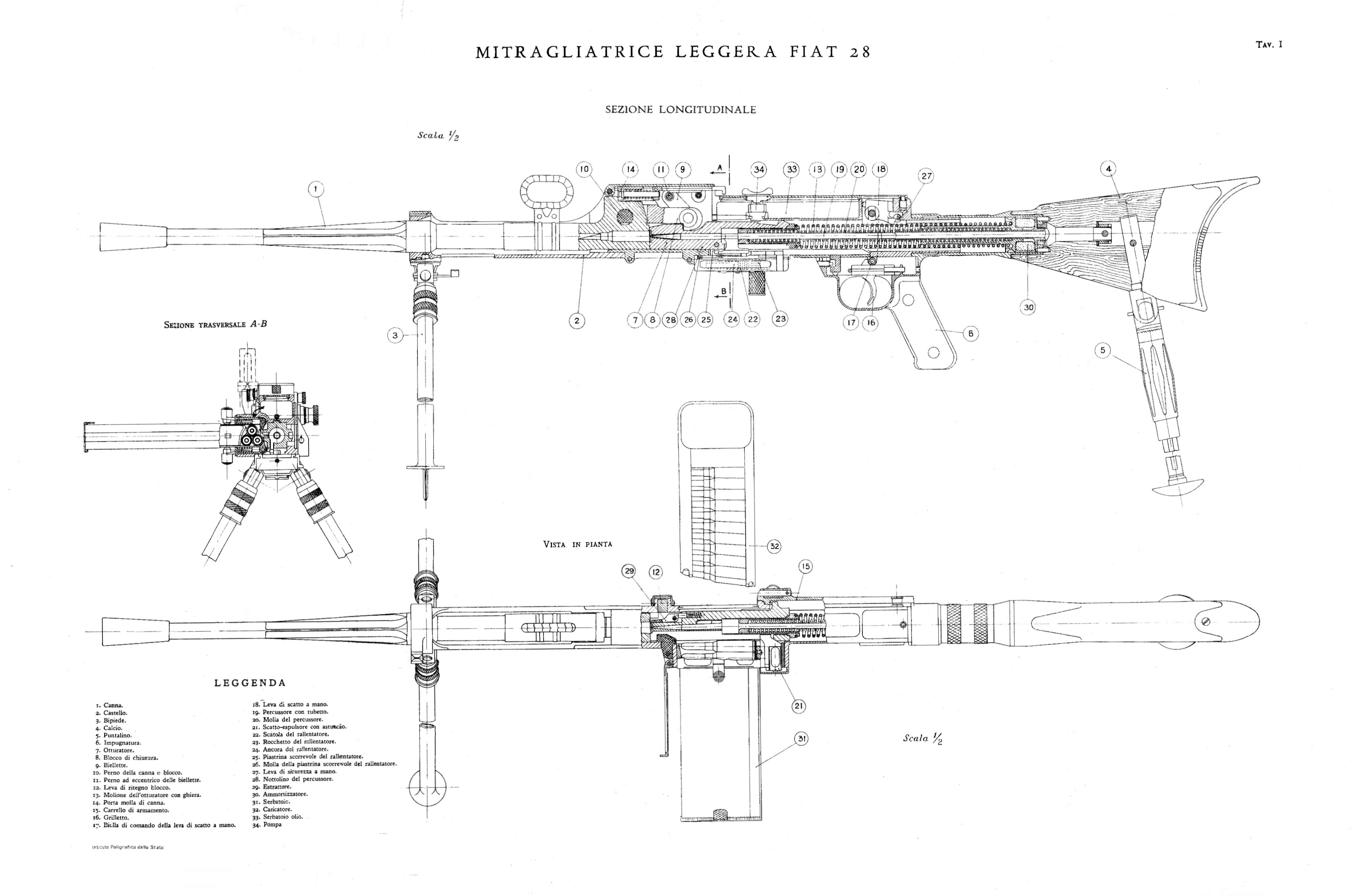
Section views of the Mitragliatrice Fiat Mod.1928.

The charging handle is located on the right side of the receiver and has a folding grip. On the rear of the receiver are the pistol grip and the wooden stock. The sight, offset on the left side, is graduated from 0 to 15 hectometres (from 0 m to 1,500 m).

On the lower side of the receiver, approximately at the height of the fixed magazine, is placed the RoF reducer.

The bipod is attached to the barrel protection sleeve and is foldable while a foldable and height-adjustable monopod is attached to the shoulder stock.
