= Armaguerra Mod. 39 rifle =

Italian semi-automatic rifle

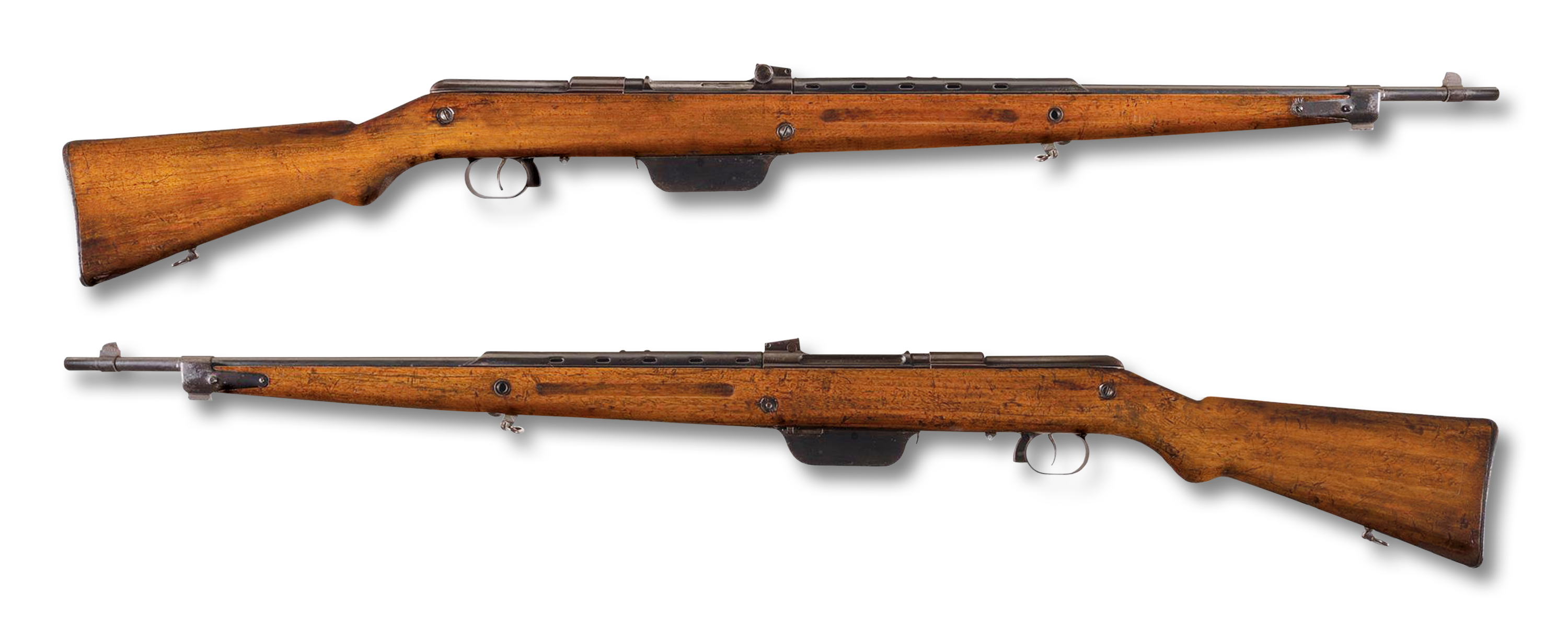
- Type: Semi-automatic rifle
- Place of origin: Italy

Service history
- In service: 1939–1945
- Used by: Italy; Italian Social Republic
- Wars: World War II; Italian Civil War

Production history
- Designer: Gino Rivelli
- Designed: 1939
- Manufacturer: Società Anonima Revelli Manifattura Armi Guerra
- Produced: 1939–1945
- No. built: Fewer than 300

Specifications
- Mass: 4.17 kg (9.2 lb)
- Length: 1,030 mm (41 in) (7.35) 1,170 mm (46 in) (6.5)
- Barrel length: 520 mm (20 in) (7.35) 594 mm (23.4 in) (6.5
- Cartridge: 6.5×52mm Mannlicher–Carcano 7.35×51mm Carcano
- Action: Short recoil
- Effective firing range: 270 m (300 yd)
- Feed system: 6 round integral magazine, loaded with a clip

The Fucile Semiautomatico Mod. 39, also known as Armaguerra Mod. 39 is an Italian semi-automatic rifle designed by Gino Revelli, the son of Abiel Bethel Revelli, who is known for the Fiat-Revelli machine gun and Glisenti Model 1910 pistol. Two versions of the rifle exist; one in 6.5x52 and the other 7.35×51mm.

== Genesis and development ==
The weapon was designed in the mid 1930s by Gino Revelli, the son of the brilliant Abiel Bethel Revelli, and its patents got co-intested with Francesco Nasturzio, Genoan Entrepreneur that financed the project.

In 1934, Revelli approached Nasturzio with a proposal for several new firearm projects to offer to the Italian Regio Esercito. At the time, the army was actively seeking a new semiautomatic rifle and a new submachine gun, among other small and large guns, to modernize its forces. Given the positive progress and the army's interest, on October 21, 1936, Revelli and Nasturzio co-founded the Società Anonima Revelli Manifattura Armi Guerra and officially participated in the army's contests for the new firearms.

Once the Italian Army adopted the new 7,35x51 cartridge in 1937, they announced in January 1938 a competition to adopt a Submachine Gun (Moschetto Automatico) in 9mm and a Semi-automatic Rifle in the new 7.35 caliber.

None of the seven semiautomatic models — three from Scotti, one from Revelli-Armaguerra, one from Beretta, one from Breda, and one from Terni — passed the Royal Army's initial trials.

A second round was announced for September 1938, open to additional companies. The final requirements for the semi-automatic rifle were:

- Caliber 7.35x51
- Barrel length 535mm
- Total length 1.1m
- Weight, including bayonet, 4kg
- Loading via Mod. 91 clips
- Exclusion of direct gas-operated models
- Maximum simplicity and robustness
- Maximum 8 MOA during trials
- Manual safety, with firing pin blocker

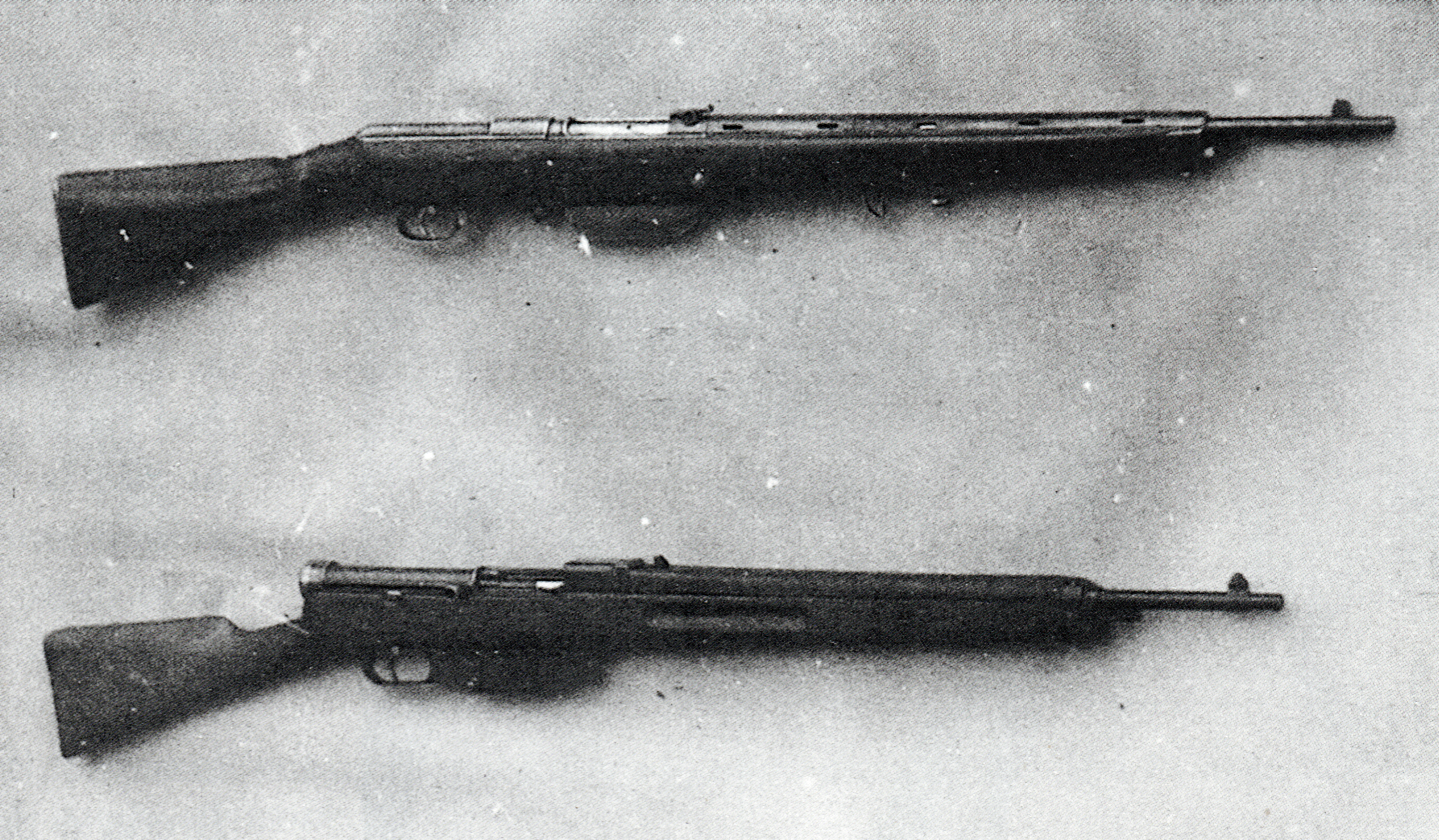
Armaguerra Mod. 39 in 7.35 on top, Breda CR5 at the bottom. This pic was taken during the late 1938 semiautomatic trials.

The contestant for this trial were:

- Fabbrica d'Armi Regio Esercito Terni, with a Genovesi-Revelli prototype,
- Società Italiana Ernesto Breda Costruzioni Meccaniche with its CR5 model,
- Armi Automatiche Scotti of Brescia with a shorter version of its Scotti mod. X,
- S.A. Pietro Beretta of Gardone V.T. with its Marangoni designed mod. 37,
- F.N.A. of Brescia with a Pavesi designed prototype;
- Si.St.Ar. of Firenze with a Mancini designed prototype
- A.R.M.A.Guerra with its Gino Revelli designed prototype.

Even though A.R.M.A.Guerra's Mod. 39 semi-automatic rifle won these trials and was officially adopted by the Royal Army in November 1939 as the Fucile Semiautomatico Mod. 39, it never entered mass production. The Revelli company, having secured an order for over 100,000 rifles, began building a new factory in Cremona. However, Italy's impending entry into World War II halted all new small arms projects.

In January 1940, the military's high command decided to revert all new rifle production from the 7.35mm caliber back to the older 6.5x52. This decision was made to simplify logistics and utilize the vast reserves of 6.5 ammunition already in army warehouses, rather than introducing a new caliber to the frontlines.

Armaguerra brand new Cremona facilities received the order to produce a small trial batch of the new mod. 39 rifle in the old 6.5x52, and the redesign and retooling took some months to complete. After producing and delivering about 200 rifles, the whole Mod. 39 production was canceled, and A.R.M.A.Guerra production lines were repurposed to produce the new Fucile mod. 41, on the Carcano action.

== Specifications ==
This semi-automatic weapon operated by short recoil with a swinging block system. The barrel and bolt recoiled together for approximately 10 mm, after which the bolt continued its rearward travel, ejecting the spent case. The weapon was fed by inserting a 6-round Carcano-Mannlicher clip from the top; it dropped out by gravity when the bolt chambered the last cartridge.

A unique feature of the weapon was the absence of a conventional cocking handle. To cock the bolt, one had to act on the front sling swivel. This swivel was non-reciprocating and did not move when firing. The bolt release lever was located in front of the trigger guard and the bolt remained open after the last shot.

The 7.35x51 version, tested in the trials, was long 1030mm and had a 520mm barrel; The rear fixed sight was zeroed for 200 meters and used the short and foldable Mod. 1938 dagger-bayonet.

The final 6.5x52 version was long 1170mm and had a 594mm barrel. The rear sight (a rotary tangent sight, similar to the swedish Ag m/42) was adjustable from 100 to 500m,mounted the longer Mod. 1891 sabre-bayonet.
