= SAFAT M1926 machine gun =

Fiat Mod. 1926
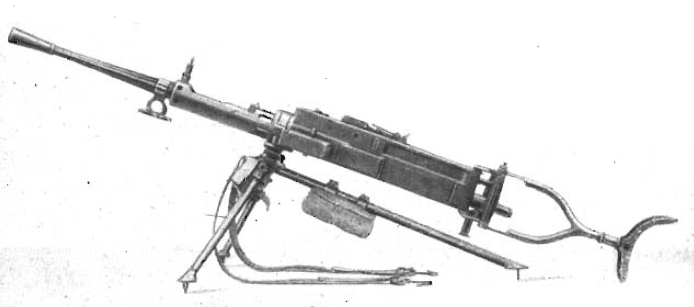
- Fiat Mod. 1926 infantry light machine gun.
- Type: Light Machine gun
- Place of origin: Kingdom of Italy

Service history
- Used by: Kingdom of Italy; Spanish State
- Wars: Spanish Civil War; World War II

Production history
- Designer: Abiel Bethel Revelli
- Manufacturer: SAFAT
- No. built: 2,000

Specifications
- Mass: 13.450 kg (29.65 lb) (Complete weight): Gun: 11 kg (24.25 lb); Shoulder stock: 0.450 kg (0.99 lb); Tripod: 2 kg (4.41 lb)
- Length: 1,340 mm (52.76 in)
- Cartridge: 6.5×52mm (6.5mm Carcano)
- Action: Short recoil
- Rate of fire: 400 rounds/min
- Muzzle velocity: 620 m/s (2,030 ft/s)
- Feed system: stripper clips of 20 rounds
- Sights: Iron

The Fiat Mod.1926, also known as SAFAT Mod.1926 or Fiat-SAFAT mod.1926, was a light machine gun made in the Kingdom of Italy in the 1920s.

== History ==
The Fabbrica Italiana Automobili Torino (Italian Torino cars factory), one of Europe's biggest car industries, was in World War I one of Italy's main suppliers of ground-based and aviation machine guns, mostly of Revelli designs.

After World War I, FIAT created in 1924 a subsidiary devoted exclusively to firearms, that was the Società Anonima Fabbrica Armi Torino, or public limited company Torino guns factory, mostly known as its abbreviated S.A.F.A.T designation.

Since the early '20s the Regio Esercito was looking for a new light machine gun to replace the S.I.A. mod.18. Developed after the Fiat Mod.1924 the Fiat Mod. 1926 was one of the many machine guns proposed for selection and was adopted in relatively small number for practical evaluation by the troops together with the competitor Breda 5C light machine gun.

Not having fully satisfied its expectations, it was replaced in the competition with the Fiat Mod. 1928, in competition with the Breda 5GF. The light machine competition was won in the end by the Breda Mod.30.

A certain amount of Fiat Mod.1926 were used also by the Regia Marina, both installed on the original tripod to equip the landing parties of major units, and installed on an anti-aircraft tripod on some minor and older units. On the same roles they were replaced progressively by the Breda Mod.30.

During the Spanish Civil War a small amount of Fiat Mod.1926 were supplied by Italy to the nationalists.

The gun was used also on some prototypes of armored vehicles from the early '30s, like: the motoblindata Guzzi, the carro armato da 9T and the fast tank with turret from 1935.

After the Italian Armistice the guns captured by the Germans were renamed 6,5 mm Leichtes Maschinengewehr 097(i).

== Design ==
The Fiat Mod.1926 is a short recoil operated gun. The gun fires from an open bolt.

The gun is air-cooled, with a quick-change barrel, the barrel is fluted to increase cooling. The barrel has to be changed after 300 rounds of full automatic fire.

The feeding system is really similar to the one used by the Breda Mod.30: a fixed magazine attached on the left side (on the Breda Mod.30 is on the right side) loaded using brass 20-round stripper clips.

One peculiarity of the Fiat is that to load the magazine the stripper clip has to be inserted through the ejection port after the retraction of the bolt.

As on the Breda Mod.30 also the Fiat mod.26 has an oil pump, installed on top of the receiver, to lubricate each cartridge before it is chambered.

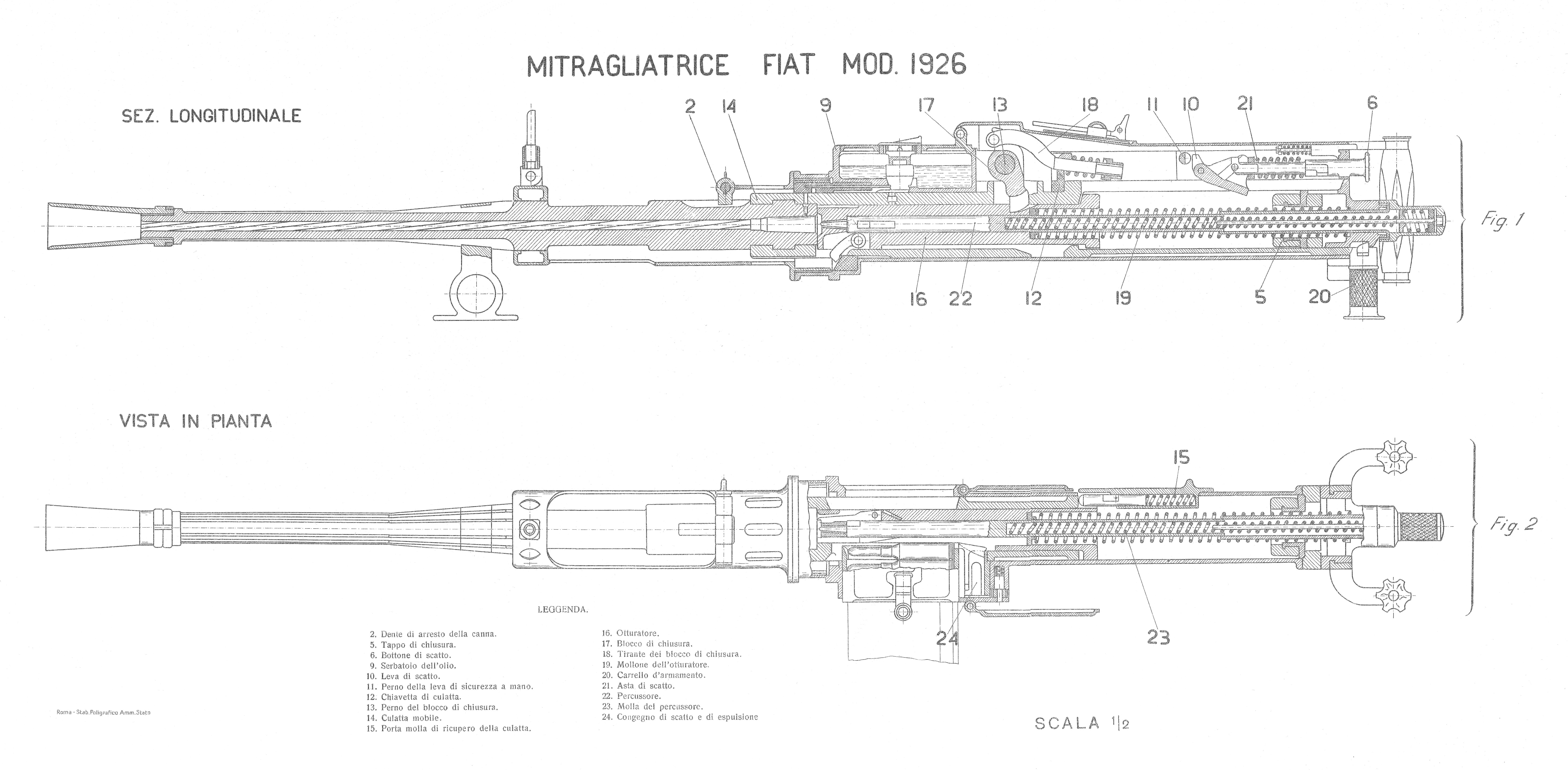
Section views of the Mitragliatrice Fiat Mod.1926.

The charging handle is located below the receiver. On the rear of the receiver there are the spade grip and the metallic folding shoulder stock, hinged on the left side. The sight is graduated from 1 to 15 hectometers (from 100 m to 1500 m).

The light tripod has the two front legs adjustable and foldable down, with the dedicated shoulder straps installed it is used also for the transportation of the whole machine gun on the gunner back.
