= Perino Model 1908 =

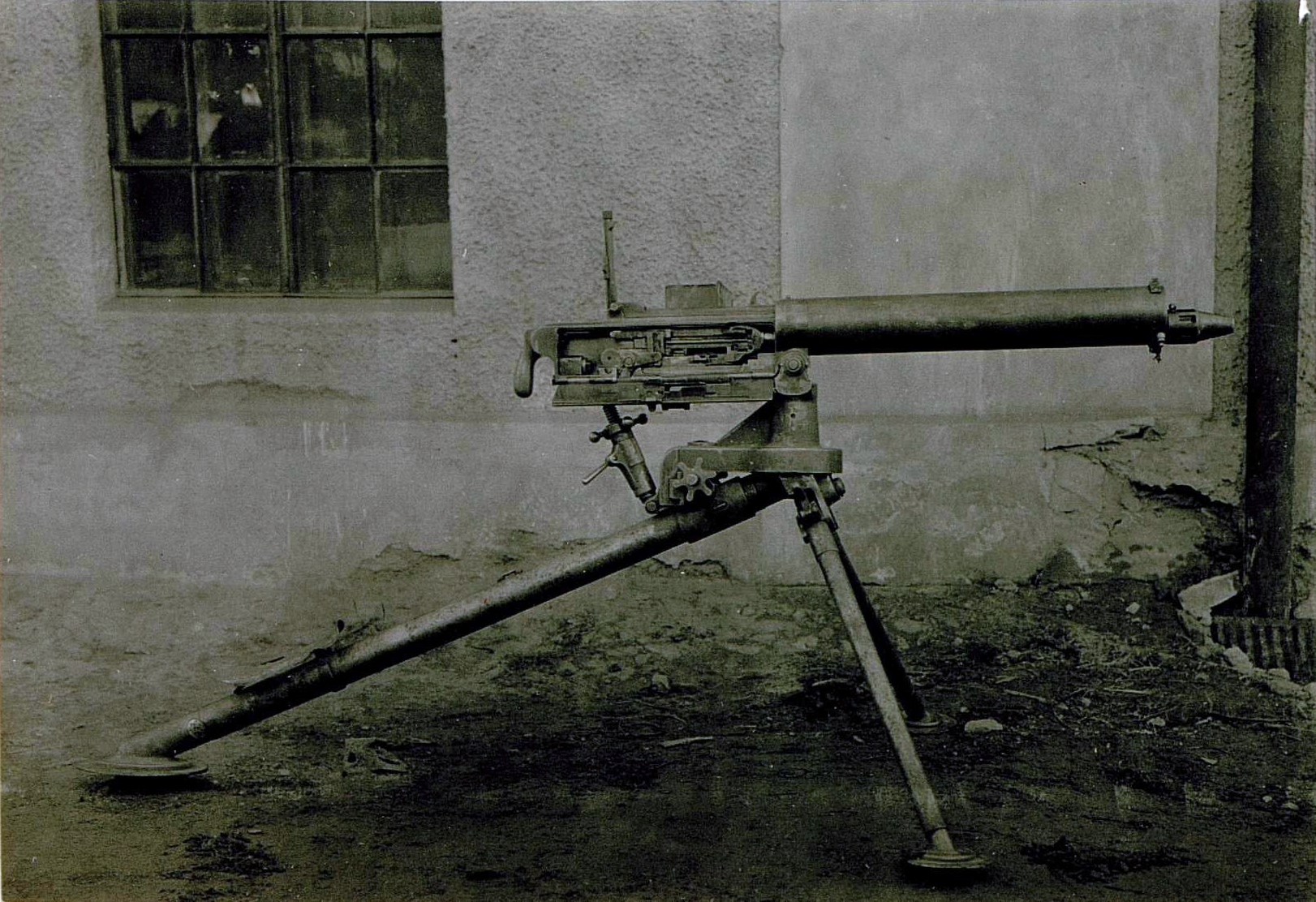
- Austro-Hungarian captured Perino MG
- Type: Heavy machine gun
- Place of origin: Kingdom of Italy, Austria-Hungary (captured)

Service history
- Used by: Italy
- Wars: Italo-Turkish War(limited),World War I

Production history
- Designer: Giuseppe Perino
- Designed: 1901

Specifications
- Mass: 27kg
- Cartridge: 6.5x52mm Carcano
- Action: Recoil
- Rate of fire: 450RPM
- Feed system: 20 round strips
- Sights: Iron

The Perino Model 1908 was an early machine gun of Italian origin designed earlier in 1901 by Giuseppe Perino, an engineer (Tecnico dell'Artiglieria). Perino's design apparently was the first Italian-designed machine gun, and in its original configuration weighed in at a heavy 27 kilograms (60 lb), which made it largely unsuitable to field utilization and apt only for fortifications; a lightened 1910 version brought the weight down to 15 kilograms (33 lb). The gun was nonetheless adopted by the Regio Esercito and saw some use alongside the Fiat-Revelli Modello 14 and the Maxim guns. It had a unique feed mechanism, with a hopper on the side of the gun filled with up to five twenty-round clips rather than being belt fed. This allowed the loader to constantly keep the gun at maximum capacity, meaning the gun crew never had to stop to reload.
