= 6.5×52mm Carcano =

Italian military rifle cartridge

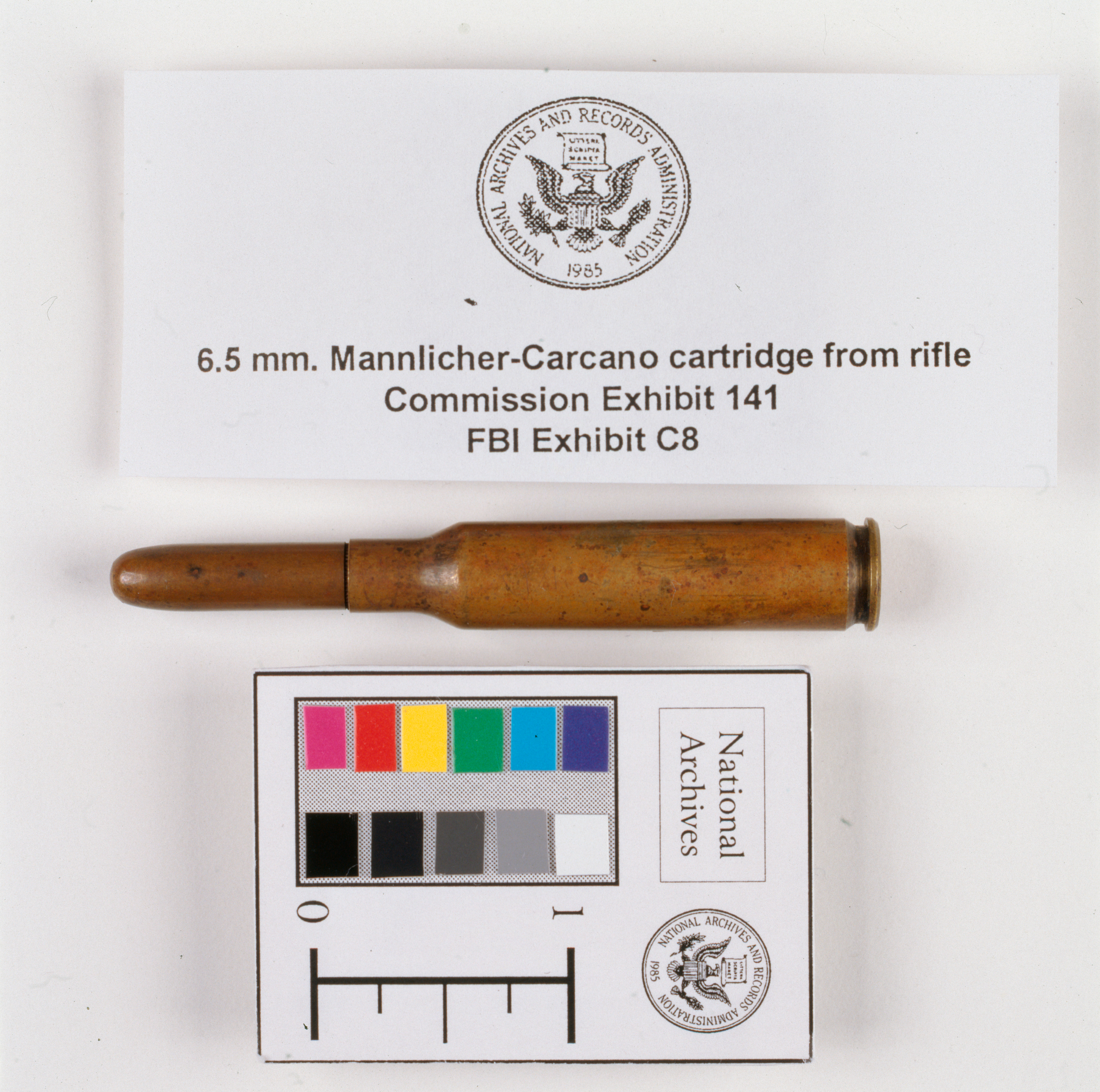
- A 6.5×52mm Mannlicher-Carcano formerly owned by Lee Harvey Oswald from Warren Commission as part of its investigation of John F. Kennedy's assassination
- Type: Rifle
- Place of origin: Kingdom of Italy (1861–1946)

Service history
- In service: 1891–1970
- Used by: Italy, Finland, Nazi Germany
- Wars: First Italo-Ethiopian War; Italo-Turkish War; World War I; Second Italo-Abyssinian War; Spanish Civil War; World War II

Production history
- Designed: 1889–1891
- Produced: 1891–present

Specifications
- Case type: Rimless, bottleneck
- Bullet diameter: 6.80 mm (0.268 in)
- Land diameter: 6.50 mm (0.256 in)
- Neck diameter: 7.55 mm (0.297 in)
- Shoulder diameter: 10.94 mm (0.431 in)
- Base diameter: 11.41 mm (0.449 in)
- Rim diameter: 11.45 mm (0.451 in)
- Case length: 52.50 mm (2.067 in)
- Overall length: 76.50 mm (3.012 in)
- Maximum pressure: 285.0 MPa (41,340 psi)

Ballistic performance
Bullet mass/type	Velocity	Energy
10.5 g (162 gr) RN	700 m/s (2,300 ft/s)	2,572 J (1,897 ft⋅lbf)
10.5 g (162 gr) RN	661 m/s (2,170 ft/s)	2,293 J (1,691 ft⋅lbf)
- Test barrel length: above 780 mm; below 445 mm. Source: https://bobp.cip-bobp.org/uploads/tdcc/tab-i/6-5-x-52-carcano-en.pdf

The 6.5×52mm Carcano, also known as the 6.5×52mm Parravicini–Carcano or 6.5×52mm Mannlicher–Carcano, is an Italian military 6.5 mm (.268 cal, actually 0.2675 inches) rimless bottle-necked rifle cartridge, developed from 1889 to 1891 and used in the Carcano 1891 rifle and many of its successors. A common synonym in American gun literature is "6.5mm Italian." In American parlance, "Carcano" is frequently added to better distinguish it from the rimmed hunting cartridge 6.5×52mmR (U.S. version: .25-35 Winchester). Ballistically, its performance is very similar to that of the 6.5×54mm Mannlicher–Schönauer.

== Design ==
Under the direction of the Commissione delle Armi Portatili (commission for portable weapons), instituted in 1888, to develop a smokeless-powder rifle for the Italian Army, the Reale Laboratorio Pirotecnico di Bologna (royal pyrotechnical laboratory of Bologna) developed and tried several different cartridge designs, with bullet diameters from 6 to 8 mm. Finally, due also to the influence of Major Antonio Benedetti of the Brescia Arsenal, secretary of the commission and strong supporter of the advantages of smallbore cartridges, the 6.5×52 cartridge was adopted in March 1890, prior to the adoption of the rifle that used it (the Model 1891 Carcano rifle).

Italian 6.5mm Carcano military cartridge, cut in half

After the adoption of the cartridge, the arsenal's technicians worried about the characteristics of the original ballistite load, since that propellant was considered too erosive (flame temperature of 3,000-3,500 °C) and not stable under severe climatic conditions. Several other loads were tested, including the British cordite, but without good results, until the Reale Polverificio del Liri (royal explosives factory of Liri) developed a new propellant called "Solenite," composed of trinitrocellulose (40%), dinitrocellulose (21%), nitroglycerine (36%) and mineral oil (3%), and shaped in large tube-like grains. The new propellant reduced the flame temperatures to 2,600 °C and proved to be very stable, and was adopted in 1896 and never changed until the end of the military production of the cartridge.

The 6.5×52mm Carcano was designed as an infantry cartridge. In accordance with the tactics of the time, the adjustable rear sight of the rifle allowed for volley fire up to 2,000 metres. The 6.5×52mm Carcano was the first to be officially adopted of a class of similar smallbore military rifle cartridges which included the 6.5×50mm Arisaka (Japan), 6.5×53mmR Mannlicher (Romania/Netherlands), 6.5×54mm Mannlicher–Schönauer (Greece), 6.5×55mm Swedish Mauser (also Norwegian Krag–Jørgensen), and the Portuguese 6.5×58mm Vergueiro.

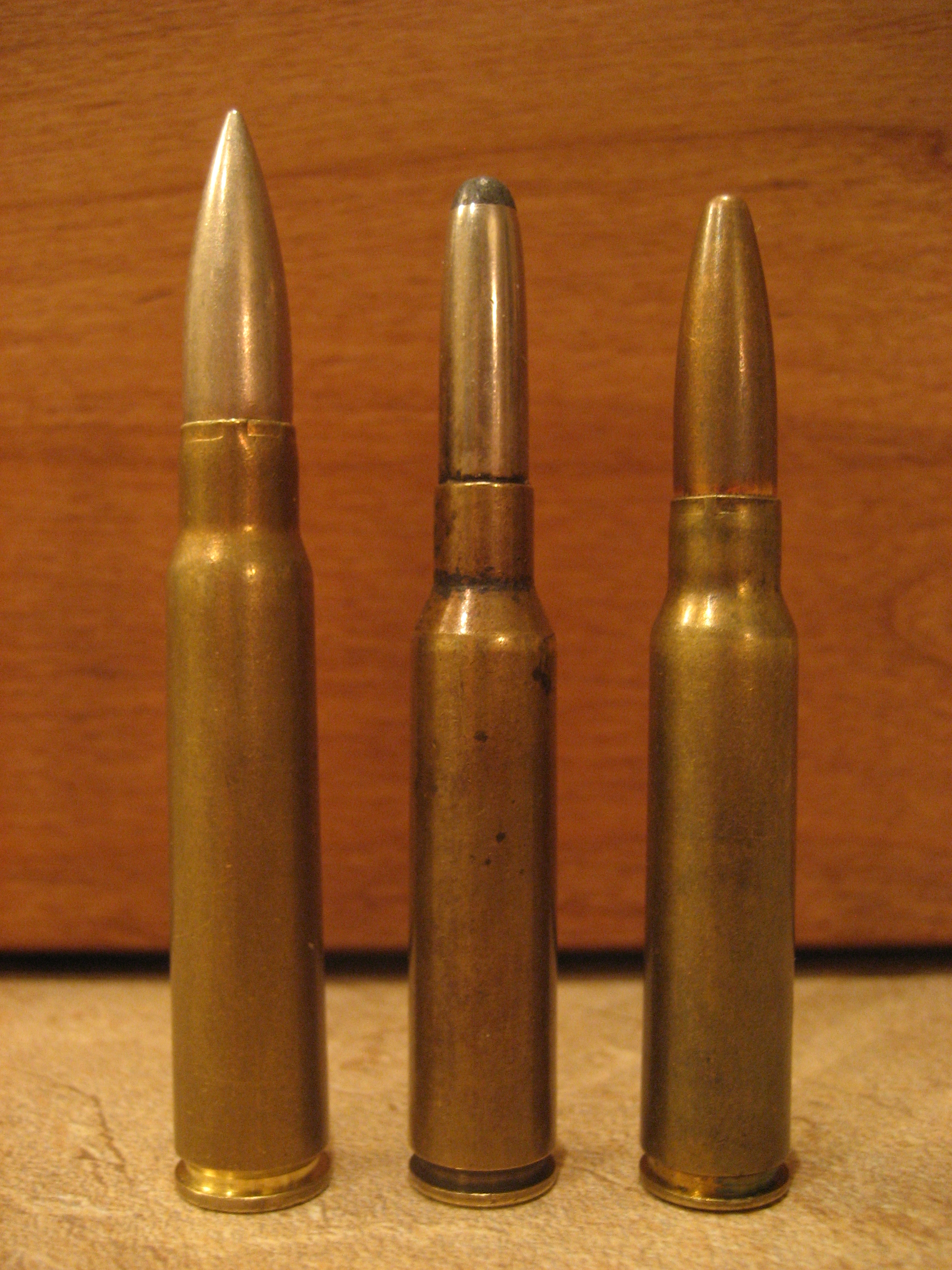
(Left to right) 8mm Mauser (also called 7.92mm Mauser), 6.5mm Carcano, and 7.35mm Carcano

A comparison with larger-bore smokeless powder cartridges of the 7 and 8 mm calibre class (such as the French 8×50mmR Lebel, the German 7.92×57mm, the Austrian 8×50mmR Mannlicher, the .303 British, the Russian 7.62×54mmR, the Belgian and 7.65×53mm Argentine, the American .30-40 Krag, and the much later .30-03 and .30-06 Springfield) may make the 6.5mm rounds appear underpowered on paper, and lacking in stopping power. However, the small bore cartridges have a long list of advantages, such as flatness of trajectory, outstanding penetration at distance, less weight, less recoil, smaller dimensions, and less material required in production.

Its short-lived intended successor cartridge, the 7.35×51mm Carcano, was designed to replace the 6.5mm Carcano, but those plans were cancelled due to the logistic difficulties that arose once World War II commenced.

The original 6.5×52mm barrel design, developed by the Brescia Arsenal at the same time as the cartridge before development of the M91 Carcano rifle itself, used a gain twist barrel with deep rifling to reduce wear and give consistent accuracy. A gain twist has a slow initial twist in the barrel, progressively getting faster until the final twist rate is attained near the muzzle, resulting in less torque being imparted to the bullet during the highest stress phase of the interior ballistic cycle, and thus less wear in the throat of the barrel. Gain twist was phased out in the last production of the Carcano rifle in favour of conventional rifling.

== Performance ==
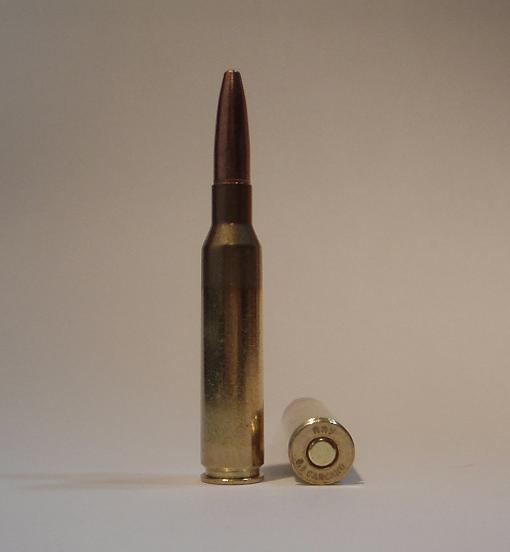
A 6.5×52mm Carcano cartridge loaded with a modern hunting bullet

The cartridge is acceptable, with proper bullet, for medium-size big game such as North American whitetail deer within 230 metres (250 yd). According to Frank C. Barnes, the cartridge has seen fairly wide use in the United States since surplus Model 91 rifles and carbines are cheap, with the original full metal jacketed bullet replaced with a soft-point bullet for hunting.

Barnes also stated that the cartridge is good for hunting deer, antelope, or black bear, while remarking that the Carcano rifle pressure limit prevents the use of loadings similar to other 6.5mm military loads. Cartridge developers and experimental handloaders such as P.O. Ackley found the rifle was able to handle excess pressure, with even Ackley's abuse "unable to break the action". After the FBI and the Infantry Weapons Evaluation Branch of the United States Army conducted test firings with Lee Harvey Oswald's rifle, the Carcano was described as being accurate and having "less recoil than the average military rifle".

The currently available factory ammunition may lack accuracy due to the use of a 6.7mm (.264 in) bullet instead of the 6.8mm (.267 in) as originally loaded. While manufacturers do sell equipment to size the neck of the cartridge case to .267, as of 2022, only one .267 option is available for handloaders. Prvi Partizan, of Serbia, manufactures a 139 gr. FMJ bullet both as a component and factory produced ammunition. Hornady produced a 160 gr. FMJ bullet until recently, but has since discontinued production.

The standard military cartridge and the currently available Prvi Partizan can be duplicated using modern smokeless powders branded by Hodgdon such as H 4831, H4064, and IMR 4895. Data includes options for .264 and .267 sized projectiles. Appropriate sized bullets (.267–.268 in.) would have to be hand cast using bullet moulds. None of the major manufacturers currently (as of 2022) list the appropriate sized projectile in their catalogs. Rare and expensive legacy moulds could be available on the second-hand market.

== In the JFK assassination ==
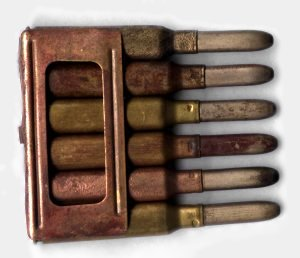
A six-round en-bloc clip

The cartridge was identified by the Warren Commission as the round used in a World War II–surplus Italian Model 91/38 rifle used on the Assassination of John F. Kennedy. According to the report, the ammunition used by Lee Harvey Oswald was produced by the Western Cartridge Company and used a 160−161 grains (10.4 g) FMJ bullet.

== Users ==
- Italy
  - Kingdom of Italy (1861–1946)
  - Italian Social Republic (1943–1945)
- Kingdom of Albania
- Ethiopian Empire
- Kingdom of Greece
- Libya

=== Firearms chambered in 6.5x52mm Carcano ===
- Armaguerra Mod. 39 rifle
- Breda 5C
- Breda 5G
- Breda 30
- Breda PG
- Brixia Mod. 1920
- Brixia Mod. 1923
- Brixia Mod. 1930
- Carcano 1891 rifle
- Cei-Rigotti
- Colleoni machine gun
- Colt Mod. 1915
- Fiat–Revelli Modello 1914
- Fiat Mod. 1924
- Fiat Mod. 1926
- Fiat Mod. 1928
- Maxim Mod. 1906
- Maxim Mod. 1908
- Maxim Mod. 1909
- Perino Model 1908
- Perino Mod. 1910
- Scotti Mod. X
- SIA Mod. 1918
- St. Etienne Mod. 1916 I
- Vetterli-Vitali Mod. 1870/87/16
- Vickers Mod. 1911
- Madsen

== See also ==
- List of rifle cartridges
- 6 mm caliber
- Table of handgun and rifle cartridges
