= FNAB-43 =

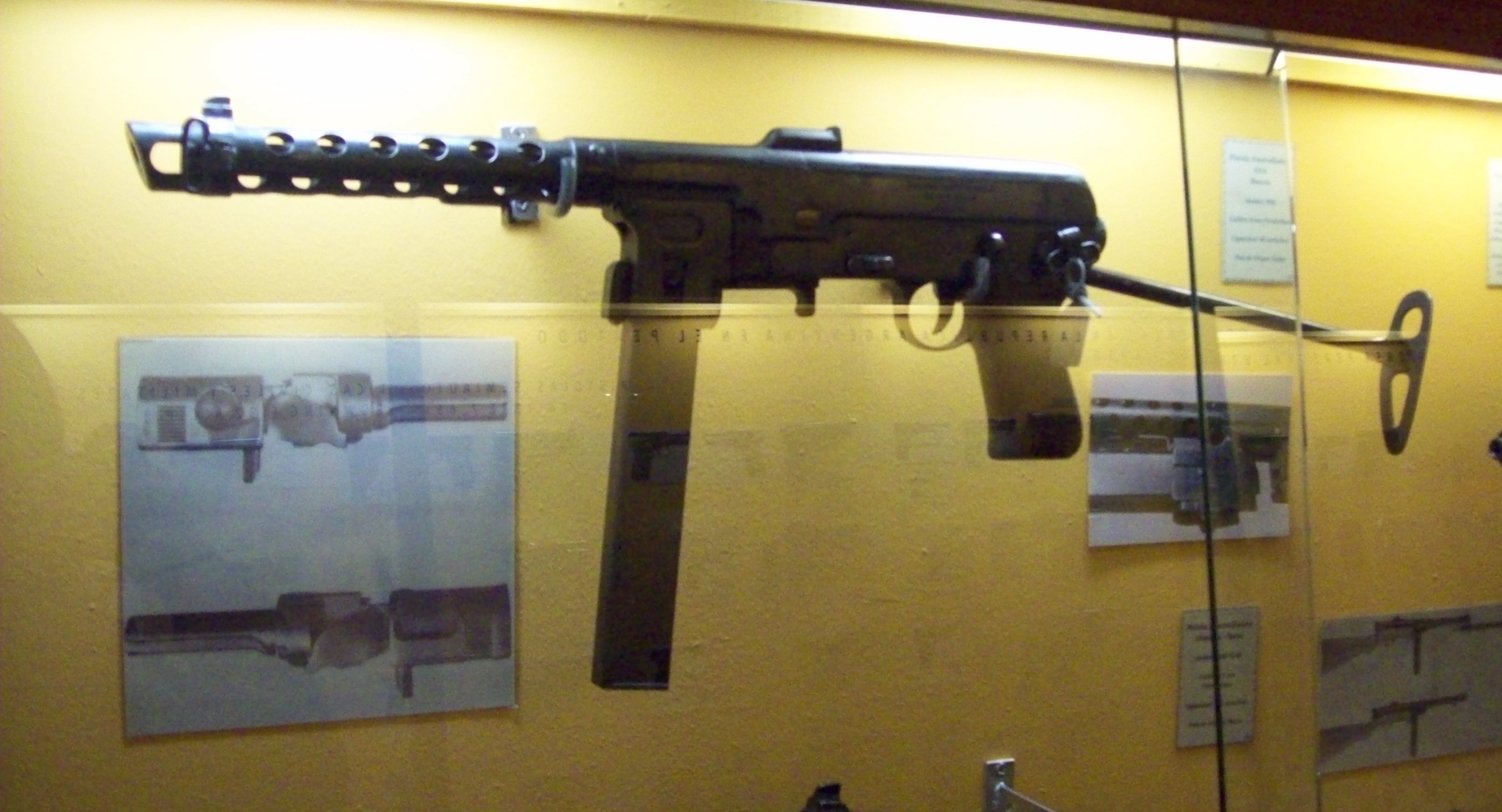
- The FNAB-43 on display
- Type: Fucile mitragliatore
- Place of origin: Italian Social Republic

Service history
- In service: 1943-1960s
- Used by: Italian Social Republic; Italian Resistance; Nazi Germany; France; Algeria
- Wars: World War II; Algerian War; Years of Lead

Production history
- Designer: Francesco Scalori
- Designed: 1942
- Manufacturer: Fabbrica Nazionale d'Armi di Brescia
- Produced: 1943–1945
- No. built: ~1,000
- Variants: Tipo 1 (standard), Tipo 2 (made for German troops with some German markings on the side)

Specifications
- Mass: 3.9 kg (8 lbs. 12 oz.)
- Length: 790 mm (31.10 in)
- Barrel length: 198 mm (7.80 in)
- Cartridge: 9×19mm Parabellum
- Caliber: 9 mm
- Action: Lever-delayed blowback, selective fire
- Rate of fire: 600-837 rounds per minute
- Muzzle velocity: 381 m/s (1250 ft/s)
- Effective firing range: 100–200 m (330–660 ft)
- Feed system: 10, 20 or 40 round detachable box magazine from Beretta Model 38
- Sights: Rear V-notch, fixed blade front sight

The FNAB-43 is an Italian designed and developed submachine gun manufactured from 1943 to 1945. The first prototype was built in 1942 and the ~1,000 built by the FNA-B according to Ian McCollum of Forgotten Weapons (Fabbrica Nazionale d'Armi di Brescia, "Brescia National Arms Factory", hence the name) were issued to German and Italian RSI (Repubblica Sociale Italiana) units fighting in Northern Italy. The FNAB-43 was an expensive weapon to manufacture as it used extensive milling and precision engineering in its manufacture.

== Description ==
External image
- FNAB-43

The FNAB-43 uses a lever-delayed blowback system, firing from the closed bolt position. The bolt is a two-piece unit with a pivoted lever interposed between bolt head and body. Upon firing, the bolt head retracts, and begins to rotate the lever; the base of which is against a lug in the body. This lever is pivoted to delay the opening movement in order to allow the bullet to leave the barrel. The breech pressure then drops before the lever has completed its rotation. The movement of the lever then presses the free end against the bolt body and accelerates the bolt's movement to the rear. The base of the lever then pulls clear of the lug, and the whole bolt unit continues to recoil as one piece. Upon returning, the lever again engages the lug and pivots forward; in doing so, removing a coupling which allows the firing pin to move only when the bolt is fully forward (in battery). Despite claims of this allowing for a slow firing cyclic rate of 400 rounds per minute, when tested, provides a cyclic rate of 837 rounds per minute. This live firing example was provided with modern 9x19 parabellum ammunition, so it is most likely that the cyclic rate that was seen in World War II is slightly lower.

The FNAB-43 also utilizes a muzzle brake and compensator built into the barrel shroud. The magazine well is hinged so that the magazine can lie beneath the barrel similarly to the French MAT-49. The single metal bar stock can be folded upwards, rendering the weapon more compact.
