= Breda PG =

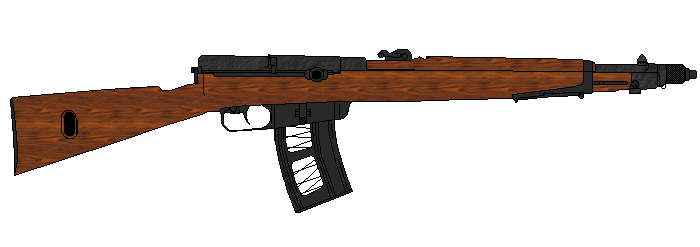
- Drawing of the Costa Rican version of the Moschetto automatico Breda PG.
- Type: Semi-automatic rifle and carbine (Italian variants); Select fire carbine (Italian and Costa Rican variants)
- Place of origin: Kingdom of Italy

Service history
- Used by: Kingdom of Italy; Costa Rica
- Wars: World War II; Costa Rican Civil War

Production history
- Designer: Sestilio Fiorini
- Designed: 1931
- Manufacturer: Breda
- Produced: 1931-1935

Specifications
- Cartridge: 6.5×52mm Mannlicher–Carcano (Italian variants); 7×57mm Mauser (Costa Rican variant)
- Caliber: 6.5mm (Italian variants); 7mm (Costa Rican variant)
- Action: Gas-operated, Open bolt
- Rate of fire: 600 RPM (Moschetto automatico)
- Feed system: 20 Round Box Magazine (Moschetto automatico)
- Sights: Iron sights

The Breda Modello PG (Italian: Presa Gas, "gas operated") was a family of guns, composed both by semi-automatic rifles and carbines and select fire carbines manufactured by Breda in the first half of the 1930s.

== History ==
In the first half of the 1930s the General Staff of the Regio Esercito was looking for a semi-automatic rifle to replace the old Carcano Mod. 91. Various Italian automatic weapons date back to that period such as the Scotti mod. T.S., the Scotti mod. IX, the Scotti Mod. X, the Beretta mod.1931, the MBT mod.1926, mod.1931 and the Breda PG.

The weapon was built and presented to the Regio Esercito in three different models:

- Fucile semiautomatico Breda PG (Semi-automatic rifle): 6.5 mm caliber, fed by the standard 6-round en bloc clip used with the Carcano Mod. 91, exclusively semi-automatic fire.
- Moschetto semiautomatico Breda PG (Semi-automatic carbine): like the aforementioned rifle but with a shorter barrel.
- Moschetto automatico Breda PG (Automatic carbine): also in 6.5 mm caliber, short barrel, select fire (semi-automatic or four-round burst), fed by detachable 20-round magazines.

The tests did not lead to significant orders, due to both their cost and high complexity.

In 1935, approximately 800 Moschetti automatici Breda PG in 7×57 mm Mauser caliber were produced for Costa Rica.

At least one Moschetto automatico Breda PG carbine was used at the Aberdeen Proving Grounds to help develop the burst-firing function on the M16 rifle.

== Design ==
All the Breda PG variants were gas-operated, open bolt guns.

The Moschetto automatico Breda PG variant was a carbine fed from a 20-round magazine. The Moschetto automatico Breda PG is considered the first burst-firing automatic rifle due its four-round burst limiter.
