= Modèle 1935 pistol =

Modèle 1935 pistol may designate:

- Pistolet automatique modèle 1935A (Alsace), developed by Charles Petter
- Pistolet automatique modèle 1935S (Saint-Étienne)
