= Breda 30 =

Italian light machine gun of World War II

Fucile Mitragliatore Breda modello 30
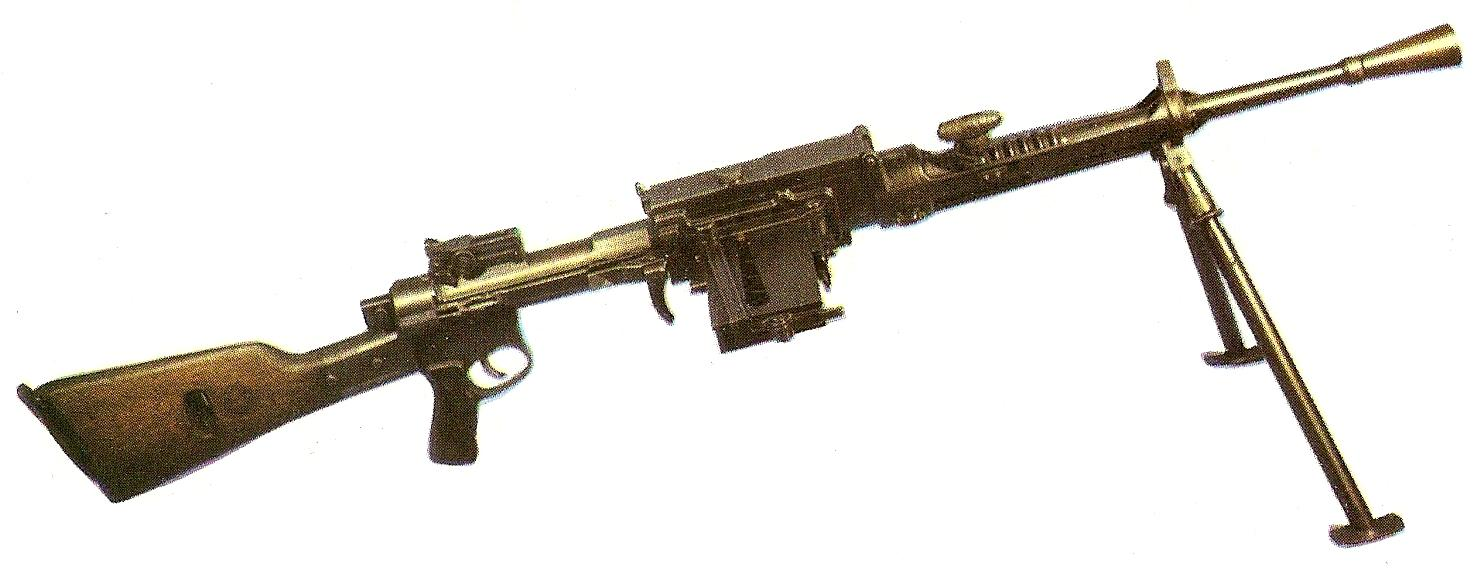
- Type: Light machine gun
- Place of origin: Italy

Service history
- In service: 1930–1945
- Used by: See § Users
- Wars: Second Italo-Senussi War; 2^{nd} Italo-Abyssinian War; Spanish Civil War; World War II; Greek Civil War

Production history
- Designed: Late 1920s
- Manufacturer: Società Italiana Ernesto Breda
- Produced: 1930–1945
- No. built: 30,000 by 1940

Specifications
- Mass: 10.6 kg (23.37 lb)
- Length: 1,230 mm (48.43 in)
- Barrel length: 450 mm (17.72 in)
- Cartridge: 6.5×52mm Carcano; 7.35×51mm Carcano (Rare)
- Action: Short recoil
- Rate of fire: Theoretical: 500 rounds/min; Practical: 150 rounds/min
- Muzzle velocity: 620 m/s (2,000 ft/s)
- Effective firing range: 1,000 m (1,100 yd)
- Maximum firing range: 2,800 m (3,100 yd)
- Feed system: stripper clips of 20 rounds

The Fucile Mitragliatore Breda modello 30 was the standard light machine gun of the Royal Italian Army during World War II. The Breda Modello 30 was issued at the squad level in order to give Italian rifle squads extra firepower. As a light machine gun, it had many issues, including jamming and overheating. It was fed by 20-round stripper clips. Despite all its faults, it formed the main base of fire for infantry units during the war.

== Background ==
After World War One, the Regio Esercito was looking for a gun to replace the previous SIA Mod.18, a light machine gun adopted in the very last months of the war.

In the competition started in the early 1920s, various machine guns were trialled. With the main candidates being the Fiat Mod. 26, Breda 5C, and some years later, the Fiat Mod.28 against the Breda 5GF. While both designs were still deemed unsatisfactory, the Army ultimately chose an improved version of the Breda, which was simpler to build. The Breda 5GF was further refined, and finally the Mod. 30 was adopted by the Army. After the adoption of the Breda Mod.30 the Army continued with testing other machine guns, like the Brixia 930 proposed by M.B.T. and various Scotti, S.I.S.T.A.R. and O.M.I. models.

== Design ==
The Breda 30 was fed from a fixed magazine attached to the right side of the weapon and was loaded using brass or steel 20-round stripper clips. If the magazine or its hinge/latch were damaged, the weapon became unusable.

The action resembled the Solothurn gun, using a locking ring located at the end of the barrel. The bolt engages the ring while the bolt, barrel, and ring move forward 9.5 mm (3/8 in), rotating the ring and locking the bolt, firing the gun. The short recoil then unlocks the bolt while the high chamber pressure blows the spent cartridge case out and pushes the bolt back to start the operating cycle. While some sources classify this process as a delayed blowback, others describe it as recoil operated. Nonetheless, the bolt does not rotate when released, resulting in cases being violently ejected from the chamber without any primary extraction. To ensure a reliable extraction, the gun had an oiler on top of the receiver that slightly oiled each cartridge as it entered the chamber. The oiled cartridges had a tendency to pick up dust and sand, jamming the mechanism, especially in dusty surroundings. One advantage of the Breda design was that it could be easily fitted with a quick-change barrel, which was somewhat of a novelty in the early 1920s.

As an automatic weapon's chamber and barrel heat up with prolonged automatic fire, the resulting excessive temperature can cause a chambered round to "cook off," or ignite without the intent of the gunner. As a result of firing from a closed bolt, the Breda 30 could not fully take advantage of the cooling properties of air circulation like an open-bolt weapon would, thus making cooked-off rounds a realistic hazard.

Most Breda 30s were chambered for the 6.5×52mm Carcano cartridge, while export versions were chambered for the 7×57mm Mauser and 7.92×57mm Mauser: the former being sold in some numbers to South American countries and the latter bought by the Baltic countries. In 1938, the Italian Army introduced the 7.35×51mm Carcano cartridge in an attempt to improve the lethality of its service rifles and light machine guns, but ultimately, only a few were converted to the new cartridge.

According to Italian military historian Nicola Pignato, it was a well-built weapon despite the rather delicate magazines. It also required a large amount of machining to produce, making it considerably more expensive in comparison to the LMGs used by other belligerent nations during World War II.

== Variants ==
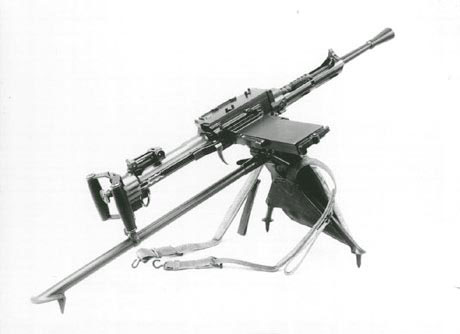
Breda Mod. 5C mounted on a tripod

All the Breda variants were mechanically identical to each other, and used a fixed 20-round magazine.

- Breda Mod. 5C − Prototype, mounted on a tripod. Fitted with spade grips and a detachable wooden stock, it was built in 2.000 units. The name was officially changed in Breda Mod. C in 1929.
- Breda Mod. 5G − Prototype, the tripod mount was replaced with a bipod and a fixed wooden stock with a pistol grip was added, together with a retractable monopod, 700 units built. The name was initially changed in Breda Mod. 5G.F. then in Breda Mod.29.
- Breda Mod. 30 − Production model, with a diagonal pistol grip
- Breda Mod. 38 − Production model chambered for the 7.35×51mm Carcano

== Service history ==
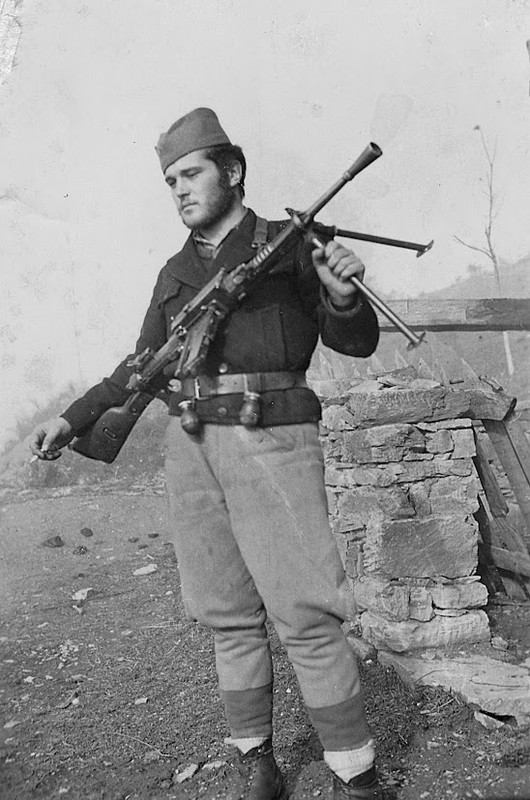
Montenegrin Chetnik armed with Breda 30 in 1942

In regular army units, one Breda 30 was issued to each squad (standard issue was 24 to 27 per battalion), although this was changed to two weapons per squad in 1938. An Italian infantry company therefore had about twelve light machine guns (four per platoon) throughout World War II.

An infantry platoon was divided into two large squads, each of eighteen men, which were further split into rifle and light machine gun sections. The squad was commanded by a sergeant, while a corporal controlled each LMG section. The latter was made up of one Breda 30, each manned by a Section leader, a gunner, and two ammunition bearers. The balance of the squad was the rifle section of 9 men. Due to the importance of its extra firepower, the Breda 30 was most often given to the squad's most reliable soldier (unlike other armies of the time, it was not rare to see an NCO carrying the squad's automatic weapon). The Army manual indicates that the three sections were to operate as distinct elements, with the two LMGs supporting each other and the rifle squad in its objective. At the time, most other armies embedded a light machine gun with each section or squad, usually half the size of the Italian section, which had to sustain these numbers to maintain decent firepower during the advance. As individual weapons, pistols were issued to each gunner, a carbine to the sergeant-major, and rifles for all others.

The Breda 30 was first used in the late stages of the Second Italo-Senussi War. It was then deployed in all war theatres where Italian soldiers were deployed, such as the Second Italo-Ethiopian War, the Spanish Civil War and the Second World War.

The Wehrmacht adopted the Breda 30 in small numbers after the occupation of Northern and Central Italy following the Italian armistice of 1943 with the Allies, as the MG 099(i). According to Pignato, production continued in the Italian Social Republic, with the German Army receiving 150 guns in April 1944 alone. German records report 351 guns delivered in October and 92 in November 1944, ending production. These guns were produced by the company Fabbrica Nazionale d'Armi in Brescia, under direct control of the Wehrmacht.

== Combat performance ==
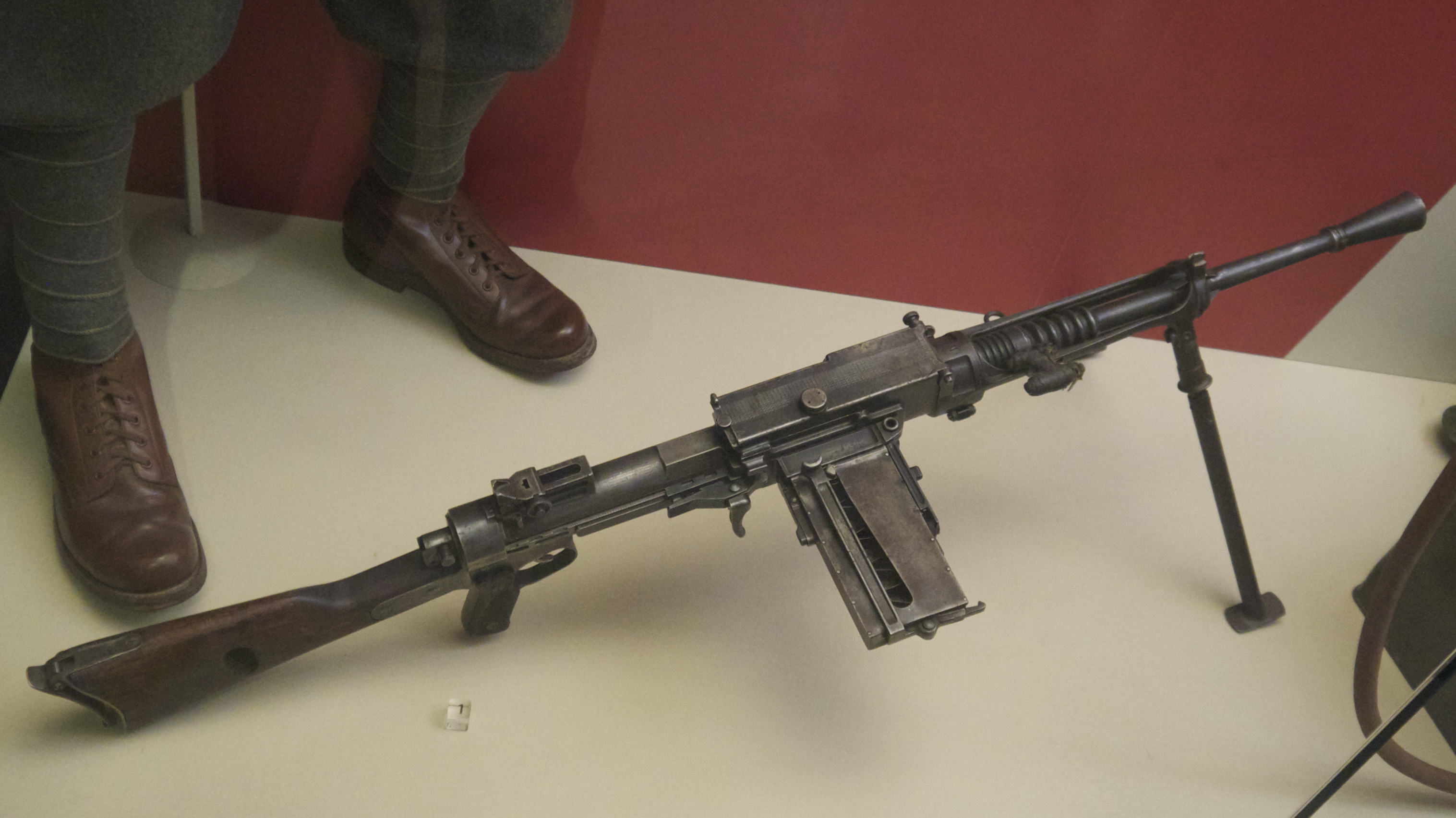
Breda 30 at Canadian War Museum

The Breda 30 is widely viewed by modern standards as a poorly designed weapon. It had a low magazine capacity and was prone to stoppages in certain climates. Though the magazine system was designed with the rationale that the feed lips on a detachable magazine are prone to damage, the Breda's sole magazine could also become disabled if the hinges or latches were damaged, and the slit on the top for viewing the ammunition count provided a way for debris to enter and jam the magazine.

Some authors claim that, since the sights were fixed on the receiver, the sights had to be re-zeroed every time the barrel was changed. This is an incorrect assumption, since many other machine-guns used the same system of sights mounted on the frame (most famously, the German MG 34 and MG 42) with no such issues and since each Breda 30 had three hand-fitted spare barrels, matching the gun mechanism. Another reported problem was the lack of a proper carrying handle, making the gun awkward to move around.

In North Africa, the oiled cartridges were a problem since they tended to attract dust and sand into the mechanism causing reliability problems, though the U.S. Military Intelligence Service has reported that the gun was "mechanically superior to the British Bren Gun under dusty conditions". In the Balkans, Eastern Front and other theatres of war, the weapon achieved better results.

Low magazine capacity and frequent jamming made firing and reloading a slow and laborious process, resulting in the Breda 30 being a weapon only capable of laying down a diminutive amount of firepower and making it a very modest contributor to a firefight. When considering all of the gun's deficiencies, taken during combat when it was at its worst, the practical rate of fire of the Breda 30 could even have been comparable to a semi-automatic weapon's practical rate of fire, such as the M1 Garand.

Although considerably flawed when compared to its contemporaries, the Breda 30 was still considered the deadliest weapon of the standard Italian infantryman's arsenal, since heavy machine guns were used at the company level and submachine guns such as the Beretta Model 38 were very rare and mostly issued to junior officers. The Breda 30, along with the Carcano rifle, made up the backbone of the Italian infantry squad armament during the Second World War. Field reports on the weapon were of mixed nature: the Breda's very low rate of fire often resulted in a turning of the tide during a firefight against Italian soldiers; however, the Breda 30, on most occasions, was the fastest and most helpful weapon available. The Italian Army attempted to counter the Breda's defects by stressing the importance of the loader's role: every soldier was trained to be a Breda 30 loader and taught how to rapidly feed one ammunition strip after another (this was not always possible, as with Breda 30s mounted on motorcycles). Careful polishing was also carried out frequently with extra attention being paid to the Breda's lubrication system and ammunition availability.

== Users ==
- Albania
- British Empire − Limited use of captured guns
- Dutch East Indies
- Estonia − 7.92×57mm Mauser version
- Germany
- Greece
- Italy
- Latvia − 7.92×57mm Mauser version
- Lithuania − 7.92×57mm Mauser version
- Romania
- Somalia
- Yugoslavia
