= Beretta Model 38 =

Italian submachine gun introduced in 1938

Beretta Modello 38
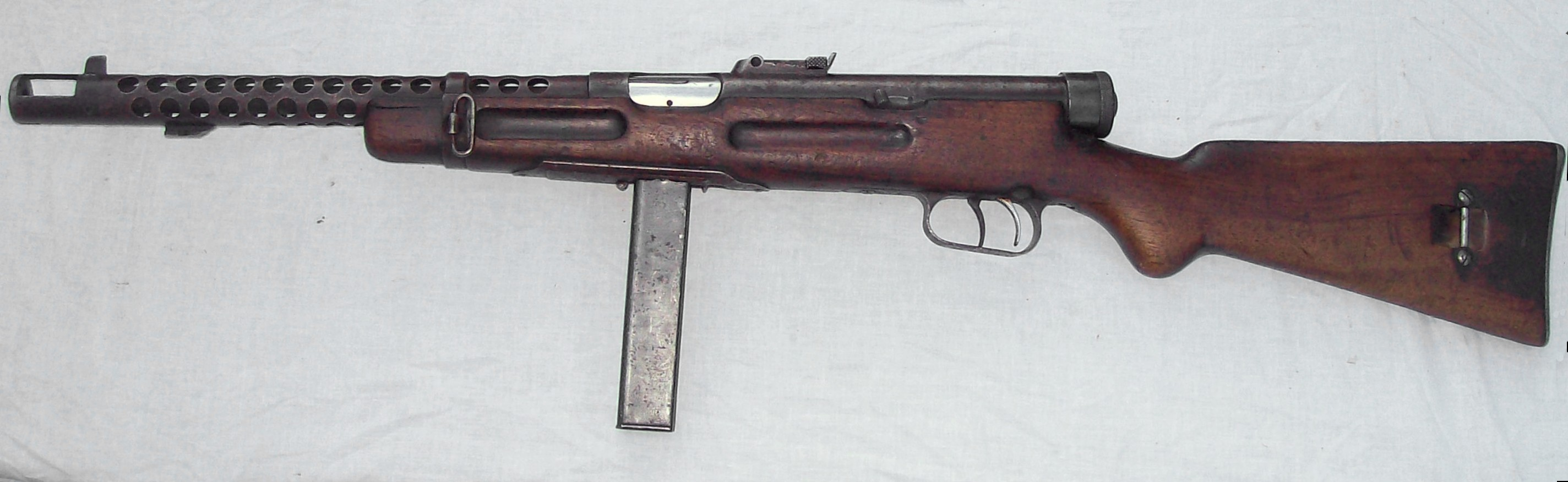
- Moschetto Automatico Beretta Modello 1938
- Type: Submachine gun
- Place of origin: Kingdom of Italy

Service history
- In service: 1938–present
- Used by: See Users
- Wars: World War II; Reprisal operations; Algerian War; 1958 Lebanon Crisis; Portuguese Colonial War; Dominican Civil War; Bangladesh Liberation War; Congo Crisis; Ogaden War

Production history
- Designed: 1935
- Produced: 1938–1975
- No. built: 1,000,000
- Variants: 1938A; 1938/42; 1938/43; 1938/44; 1938/44 Special - Model 1; 1938/49 - M2, M3 & M4; Model 5

Specifications
- Mass: MAB 38A: 4.2 kilograms (9.3 lb) (empty); MAB 38/42: 3.27 kilograms (7.2 lb) (empty); MAB 38/49: 3.25 kilograms (7.2 lb) (empty)
- Length: MAB 38A: 946 millimetres (37.2 in); MAB 38/42: 800 millimetres (31 in); MAB 38/49: 798 millimetres (31.4 in)
- Barrel length: MAB 38A: 315 millimetres (12.4 in); MAB 38/42: 213 millimetres (8.4 in); MAB 38/49: 210 millimetres (8.3 in)
- Cartridge: 9x19mm Parabellum
- Caliber: 9 mm (0.35 in)
- Action: Blowback
- Rate of fire: MAB 38A: 600 rpm MAS 38/42 and 38/49: 550 rpm
- Muzzle velocity: MAB 38A: 420 metres per second (1,378 ft/s); MAS 38/42 and 38/49: 380 metres per second (1,247 ft/s)
- Effective firing range: 200 m (219 yd)
- Feed system: 10, 20, 30, or 40-round detachable box magazine

The Beretta Model 38 (Italian: Moschetto Automatico Beretta Modello 1938) is an Italian submachine gun introduced in 1938 and used by the Royal Italian Army during World War II. It was first issued to Italian police units stationed in Italy's African colonies. The Italian army was impressed by the gun's performance and decided to adopt a version to be used by the army's elite formations and military police, but requested a modified variant which had no bayonet and a different muzzle brake. This variant was widely used by the Royal Italian Army on all theatres of World War II Italy was involved in. The guns were also used by the German, Romanian and Argentine militaries of the era.

== History ==
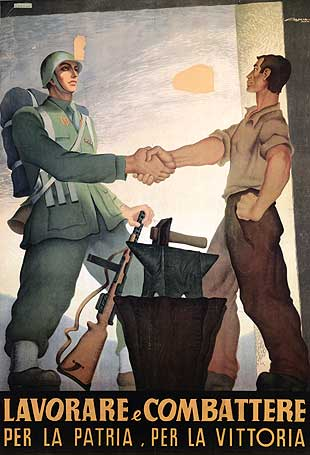
Italian WWII propaganda poster showing a Beretta Model 38

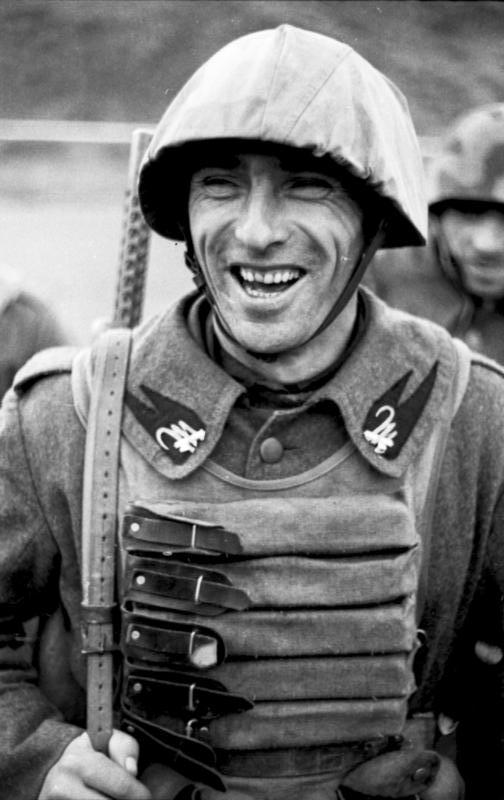
Soldier of an assault Battalion of the Republican National Guard (GNR) of Repubblica Sociale Italiana, armed with a MAB 38A and wearing a "Samurai" magazine-holding vest.

Originally designed by Beretta's chief engineer Tullio Marengoni in 1935, the Moschetto Automatico Beretta (Beretta Automatic Musket) 38, or MAB 38, was developed from the Beretta Modello 18 and 18/30, derived from the Villar Perosa light machine gun of World War I. It is widely acknowledged as the most successful and effective Italian small arm of World War II and was produced in large numbers in several variants. Italy's limited industrial base in World War II was no real barrier toward the development of advanced and effective small arms since most weapons of the time required large amounts of artisan and semi-artisan man-hours to be fine-tuned anyway. Italian specialized workers excelled at this, but the initial slow rate of production meant that the MAB 38 only became available in large numbers in 1943 when the fascist regime was toppled and Italy split between the Allied-aligned co-belligerent forces in the south and the German-aligned collaborators of the Italian Social Republic in the north.

The MAB 38 was developed by Beretta to compete in the sub-machine gun market and to take part with the Semiauto rifle and submachinegun Italian Army trials that were held during the 1930s; it was a well-made and sturdy weapon, introduced several advanced features, and was suitable for police and special army units. Presented to Italian authorities in 1938, its first customer was the Italian Ministry of Colonies, which purchased 500 MABs in October 1938 to be issued as the standard firearm of the Polizia dell'Africa Italiana (Italian Africa Constabulary), the government colonial police force. Army orders were slow to come; although impressed by the excellent qualities and firepower of the weapon, the Italian military did not feel the MAB was suitable for standard infantry combat. It was judged ideal for police and assault units. Small orders were placed by the 1st Mobile Battalion of the Guardie di Pubblica Sicurezza (national state police) in May 1939. Once Italy entered war, PAI had to donate some of their MABs to the Libyan Paratrooper units. Within November 1941 he Italian Army requested 10.527 MABs with minor changes to reduce production costs, notably changing the muzzle brake and the removal of the bayonet lug to create the MAB 38A. This was the standard army variant, used throughout the war and issued to commissioned officers and to elite Italian units, like motorcyclists, paratroopers, the Alpini "Monte Cervino" skiers assault battalion, 10th Arditi Regiment, "M" Battalions of the Milizia Volontaria per la Sicurezza Nazionale (MVSN, Blackshirts) and military police. by December 1941, seeing the good results on the field, another 20 000 guns were ordered.

The Italian Royal Navy also purchased the weapon and MAB 38As were given to the "San Marco" Marine Regiment and naval security troops; the Regia Aeronautica (Italian Royal Air Force) issued the MAB 38A to its crack A.D.R.A. Regiment. Orders were still small and the Carcano M1891 rifle remained the standard weapon even in elite units. Until 1943, the MAB 38A (and since mid 1943, the MAB 38/42) was available almost exclusively to commissioned officers, paratroopers, motorcyclists, skiers and other elite or police units, given their need for high volumes of firepower in prolonged actions or to maintain close-quarters combat superiority. The paratroopers of the 185th Infantry Division "Folgore" had their NCOs armed with the weapon, while the rest of the unit used either the Moschetto mod. 91/38 Carcano or the Breda Mod.30 LMG, along other firearms.

After the Italian armistice of September 8, 1943, the Italian armed forces melted away and an Italian army was reconstructed in northern Italy under German control, the Beretta MAB equipping many units. The Italian Social Republic (R.S.I.) army and militia units fought a counterinsurgency war against partisans from its inception, as well as against the Allies. For assault and counterinsurgency units, where firepower at close range was a vital asset, it was the ideal weapon. Production of the MAB became priority and it was supplied in great numbers to R.S.I. formations, especially elite units, and it became an iconic weapon symbolizing the Italian soldier in popular culture. Later in the war, a simplified variant known as the MAB 38/44 was introduced. Regardless of the tables of organization and equipment of a unit, the Beretta 38 was a popular weapon that could eventually find its way into the hands of virtually any soldier, especially among officers and senior non-commissioned officers, in any type of unit.

A magazine-carrying vest was designed for elite troops (Battaglioni M, paratroopers, marines) armed with the Beretta 38; these were dubbed "Samurai" due to the similarity of the stacked magazines to the feudal Japanese warriors' body armour. A special canvas holster was issued with the MAB with two magazine-carrier pouches sewn on, to be worn as a belt but only came into use during the brief life of the R.S.I. and by then could be seen in the employ of many different units whose "elite" status could have been reasonably questioned (such as Black Brigades and other militias). The Beretta MAB was highly praised by Italian resistance movement fighters as well, being far more accurate and powerful than the British Sten which was common-issue in partisan units, although the smaller Sten was more suited for clandestine operations. German soldiers also liked the Beretta MAB, judging it as large and heavy, but reliable and well-made.

The 1938 series was extremely robust and proved very popular with Axis forces as well as Allied troops, who used captured examples. Many German soldiers, including the Waffen-SS and Fallschirmjäger forces, preferred the Beretta 38. Germany manufactured 231,193 Beretta M38s in 1944 and 1945. Firing a more powerful Italian version of the widely distributed 9×19mm Parabellum cartridge, the Cartuccia 9 mm M38, the Beretta was accurate at longer ranges than most other submachine guns. The MAB could deliver impressive firepower at close range, and at longer distances its size and weight was an advantage, making the weapon stable and easy to control. In expert hands, the Beretta MAB allowed accurate short-burst shooting up to 100 m (110 yd) and its effective range with Italian M38 ammunition was 200 m (220 yd)s, an impressive result for a 9mm submachine gun.

== Variants ==
The Model 1938 can be recognized by its machined steel receiver, fine craftsmanship, and finish, and by the perforated cooling jacket over the barrel. It was produced from 1938 to 1950 and fired 9×19mm Parabellum ammunition at 600 rounds per minute. It used 10, 20, 30, or 40-round magazines; the short 10-round magazine, when used in conjunction with the fixed bayonet, was popular with Allied and Axis forces for guarding prisoners or internal security. In combat, the 40-round magazine was the most common. The original MAB 38, first issued to Italian police in 1939, had a bayonet mount and stock rest for the Carcano M91/38 folding bayonet.

In compliance with Italian army requirements, the bayonet mount and rest were eliminated and the recoil compensator was redesigned, the two horizontal muzzle slots substituted by 4 transversal cuttings, judged more effective. This standard army variant was renamed MAB 38A and issued in 1941. Despite its undeniable effectiveness, the Beretta Model 38 proved too time-consuming and expensive to produce during wartime. Marengoni designed a simplified model made from sheet steel, in which the cooling jacket and bayonet mount were eliminated and the separate firing pin mechanism replaced by a fixed firing pin machined on the face of the bolt. The barrel and wooden stock were also shortened to save weight and cost. This new model, the Model 38/42, had a fluted barrel to aid cooling and save weight. It also had a slower rate of fire (550 rpm). The Model 38/43, was a collapsible stock variant adopted in February 1943 and designed for tank crews, but saw very limited production. The 38/42 was adopted by the Wehrmacht as the Maschinenpistole 738(i), abbreviated as MP.738 as well as Model 38A after Nazi Germany took over the Beretta Manufacturing Factory following the Italian Armistice and the German takeover of Italy during Operation Achse. Models produced for the German army received German acceptance marks.

The Model 38/44 was a minor revision of the 38/42, in which the bolt was simplified and a large-diameter recoil spring was used in place of the operating spring guide. It also eliminated the fluting to save time and increase production. The 38/44 was also adopted by the German army as the MP.739.

After World War II, the 38/44 continued in production in slightly revised form as the 38/49 series: the Model 2 or MP 38/44 special with an MP 40-style under-folding stock and extended magazine well, the Model 3 with an extended magazine well and telescoping steel-wire buttstock and the Model 4 with a standard wooden rifle stock. All of these models have a push-button cross-bolt safety catch at the middle of the stock After Marengoni's death, Beretta engineer Domenico Salza revised the safety system of the Model 38/49 series as the Model 5, identified by a large rectangular grip-safety button located in the stock's finger groove. The Model 5 was produced for the Italian Army, police and the armed forces of several other nations until 1961 when production ceased in favor of the compact, modern Beretta M12.

Unusually, it ejects to the left because of the non-reciprocating cocking-charging handle and slot cover being in the way on the right side.

In the 1950s the Dominican Republic issued the Cristóbal Carbine carbine in American .30 Carbine (7.62×33) designed by Pál Király. Visually and internally, several features of the Model 38 carried forward in the San Cristóbal.

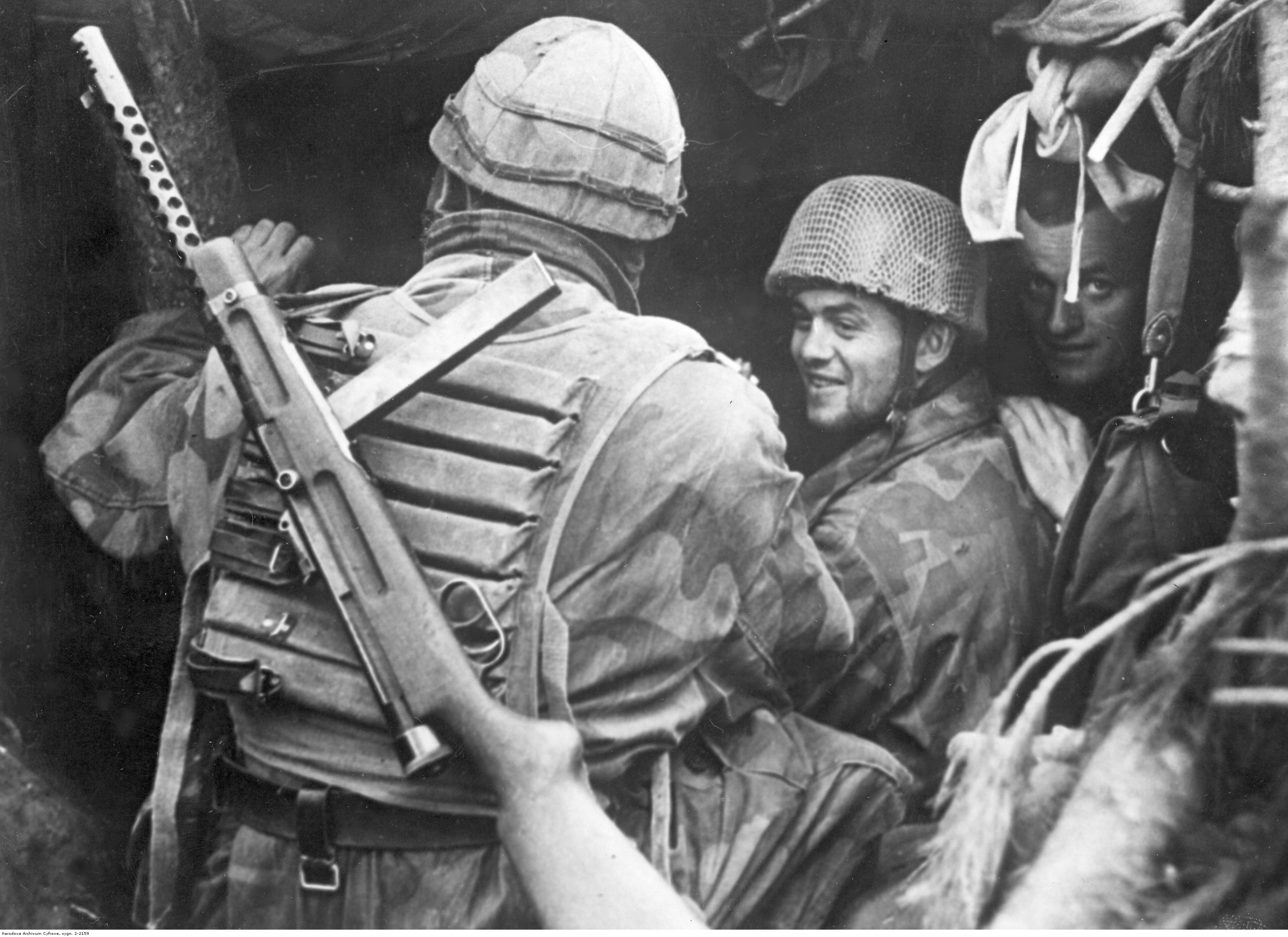
German and Italian paratroopers at the Anzio-Nettuno front; the Italian has a MAB 38A slung across his back.

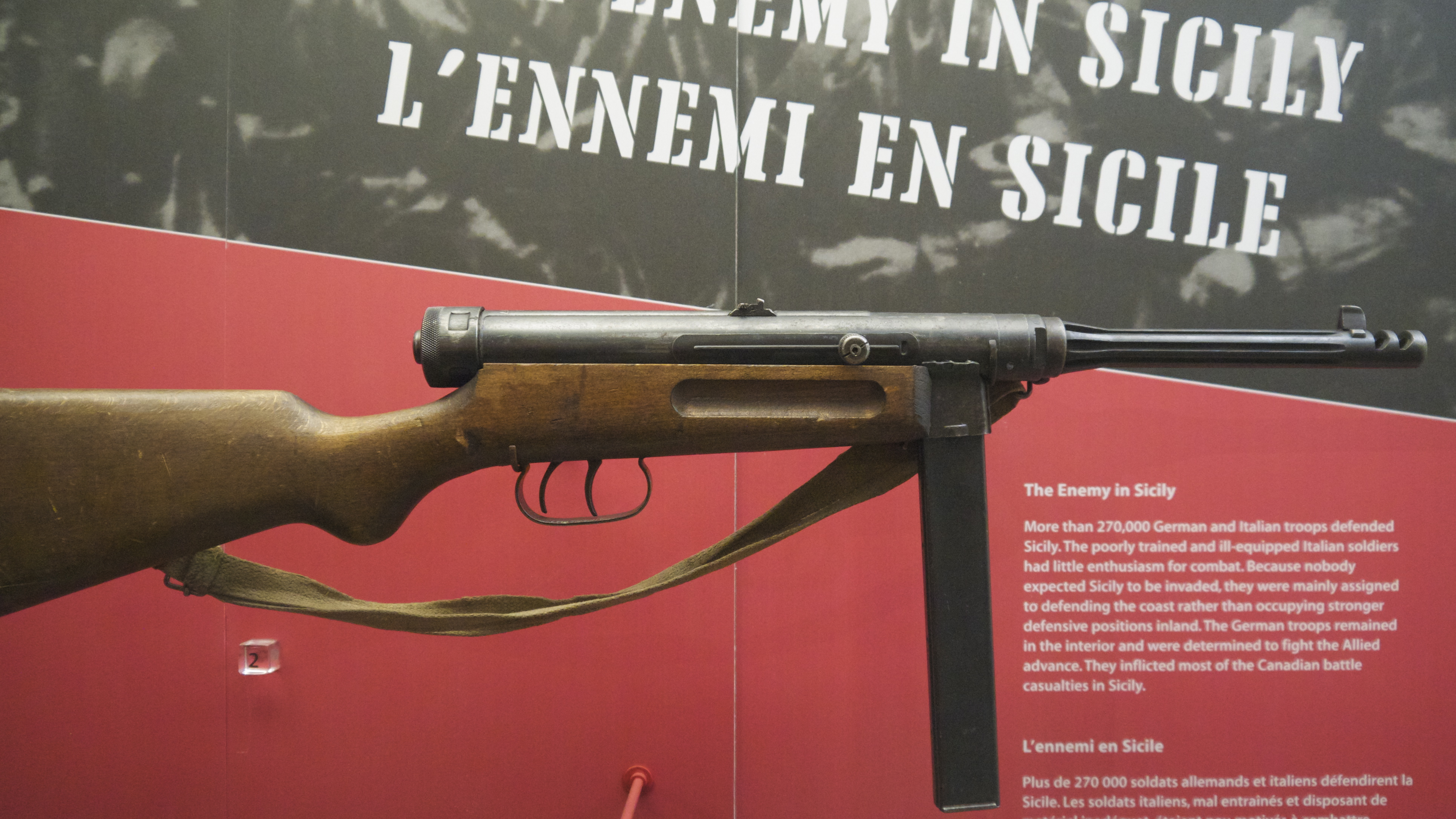
Beretta M38/42

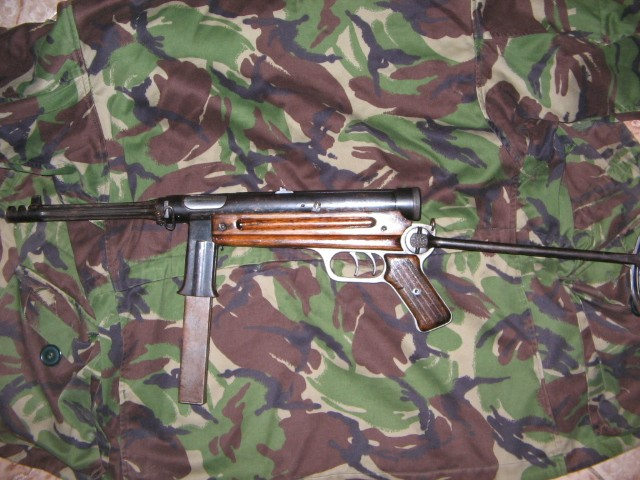
Beretta Model 1 with MP40-style under-folding stock

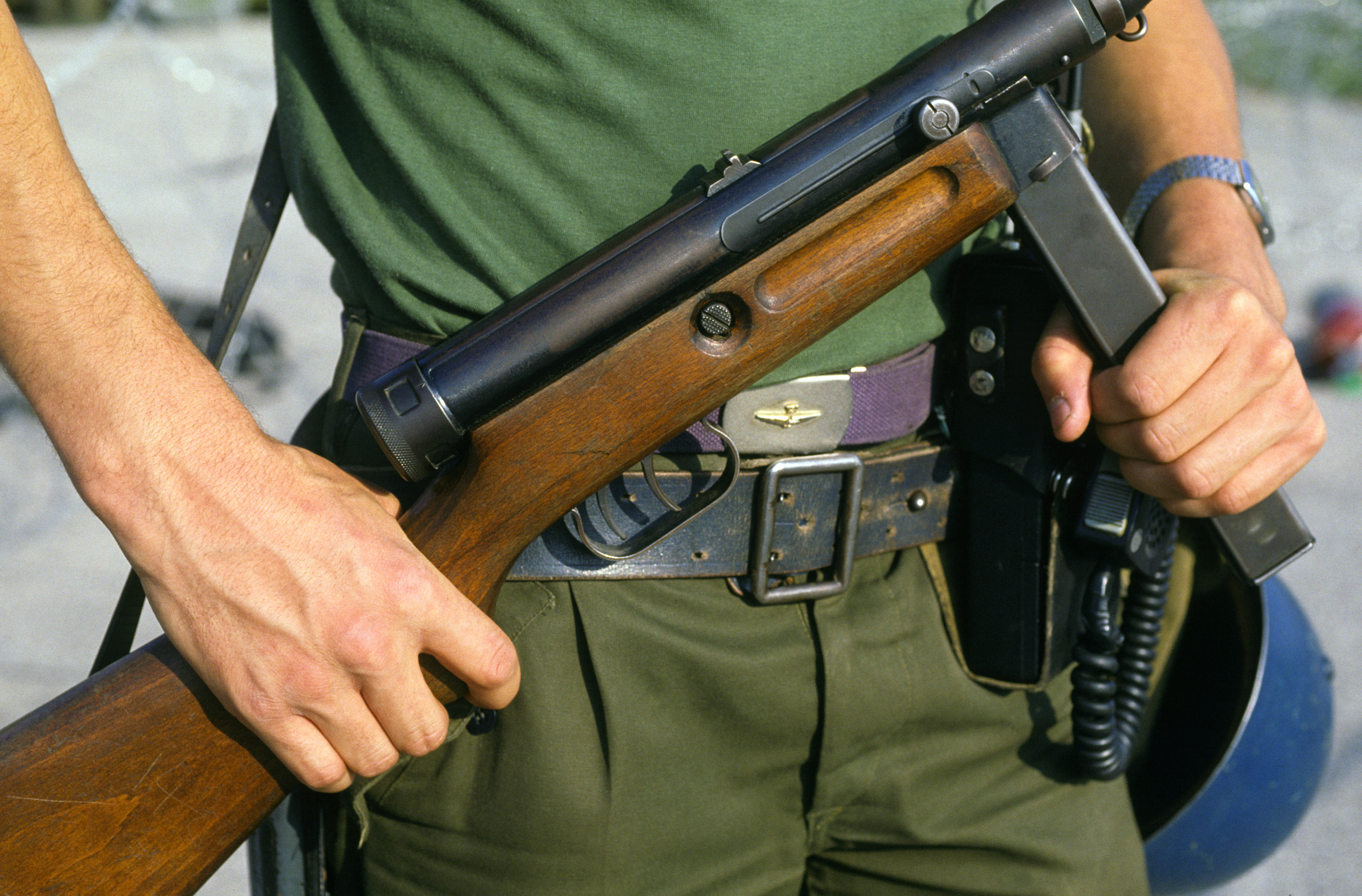
Beretta M38/49 (Model 4) (push-button cross-bolt safety is located at the middle of the stock)

== Users ==
- Argentina
- Albania: captured by the Albanian Partisans in vast quantities during the war
- Algeria: Used by Armée de Libération Nationale
- Bangladesh: Used by Mukti Bahini.
- Bulgaria: MAB38A
- Costa Rica: Models 38/44 and 38/49
- Dominican Republic: Model 38/49
- Cyprus
- Empire of Japan: 350 ordered and 50 MP38/43 delivered in 1943; some were captured by Allied forces in the South Pacific.
- Egypt: Models 38/42 and 38/49.
- Ethiopia
- Finland: Italian surplus MP38s bought in 1958.
- Greece
- Nazi Germany
- West Germany: MP38/49 (Model 4) and Model 5, identified as the MP1. Used by Bundeswehr (until 1959) and Bundesgrenzschutz (replaced at the end of the 1960s).
- Hungary: after Italy exited WW2.
- Indonesia: MP1938/49 variant. Deployed during the United Nations Operation in the Congo.
- Iran
- Iraq: Model 38/44
- Italy
  - Italian Social Republic
  - Italian Resistance
  - Italian Co-belligerent Army
- Lebanon: Used by the Lebanese Army, Lebanese Gendarmerie and rebel pan-Arabist militias during the 1958 Lebanon Crisis.
- Libya
- Morocco
- Pakistan: Model 38/44.
- Poland: 128 pieces delivered in 1944 to the Home Army by Allied aviation from Italy.
- Romania: 5,000 ordered in 1941, which were received during 1942. Those bought included both the Model 38A and the Model 38/42.
- Saudi Arabia
- Somalia: Used by Western Somali Liberation Front rebels during Ogaden War.
- Syria
  - Syrian National Coalition
- Thailand: Model 38/49.
- Tunisia: Model 38/49
- Yemen: Model 38/49.
- Yugoslavia: Captured in vast quantities.

== See also ==
- List of Italian submachine guns
