= TZ-45 =

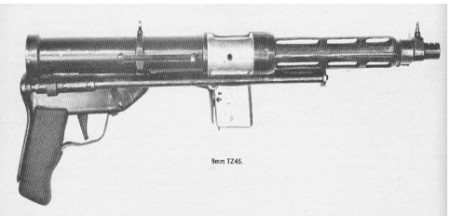
- A TZ-45
- Type: Submachine gun
- Place of origin: Italian Social Republic

Service history
- In service: 1944-1945
- Used by: Italian Social Republic; Wehrmacht; Burma
- Wars: World War II; Myanmar conflict

Production history
- Designer: Tonon and Zorzoli Giandoso
- Designed: 1944
- Manufacturer: Fabbrica Fratelli Giandoso
- Produced: 1944–1945; 1952-55 (Burma)
- No. built: 6,000 (Approx.)
- Variants: TZ-45 (Italy); BA-52 (Burma)

Specifications
- Mass: 7 lb (3.2 kg)
- Length: 33.27 in (845 mm) (stock extended); 21.5 in (550 mm) (stock folded)
- Barrel length: 9 in (230 mm)
- Cartridge: 9×19mm Parabellum, 9mm Fiocchi
- Caliber: 9 mm
- Action: API blowback, selective fire
- Rate of fire: 800 Rounds Per Minute
- Muzzle velocity: 380 m/s (1,200 ft/s)
- Effective firing range: 150 m (490 ft)
- Feed system: 40 round detachable box magazine
- Sights: front sight, rear sight

The TZ-45 was an Italian blowback-operated submachine gun produced between 1944 and 1945, with an estimated 6,000 made.

== History ==
The TZ-45 submachine gun was designed by two Italians; Tonon, a lieutenant colonel in the National Republican Army whose first name remains unknown and Aldo Zorzoli, a gunsmith, and was produced by the Giandoso company. The vast majority of the estimated 6000 TZ 45s produced were issued to R.S.I. (Repubblica Sociale Italiana) units fighting against Italian partisan forces during the civil war in Northern Italy (1944–45). A few TZ-45 were possibly used by the Wehrmacht forces engaged in similar operations. After the war, the remaining guns were given to the military of the British and the American forces where they were evaluated. The general opinion was unfavorable due to the style of manufacturing and finish.

The projects and manufacturing rights for the gun were later sold to the Burmese army where it was manufactured as the BA-52 and colloquially known as the "Ne Win STEN". The weapon remained in service into the mid-1980s with the Burmese infantry and into the early 1990s with support troops.

== Design and construction ==
The TZ-45 was manufactured by a stamped process and was then welded together with a simple finish applied. The blowback-operation was similar to other submachine guns at the time, though the return spring differed as it was assembled around a telescoping guide rod. A muzzle brake was fitted to the firearm, and the shoulder stock of the weapon was formed out of steel rods that slid alongside the receiver when retracted.

Safety mechanisms for the gun included a fire selector that has a safe position that locks the bolt in the forward or rearward position, a grip safety behind the magazine housing preventing the bolt from moving in the direction of cocking or firing unless properly held, and a pin wedged in a specially designed notch in the bolt, preventing it from rolling back in case of accidental shock.

Accidental discharges were a common occurrence in similar submachine guns such as the Sten gun and M3. However, the double safety system the TZ-45 utilized proved to be a breakthrough which would inspire later submachine guns, such as the Danish Madsen M50.

== Users ==
- Italian Social Republic
- (Kingdom of Italy) Italian partisans
- Burma
- Nazi Germany
