= 7.35×51mm Carcano =

Italian rifle cartridge

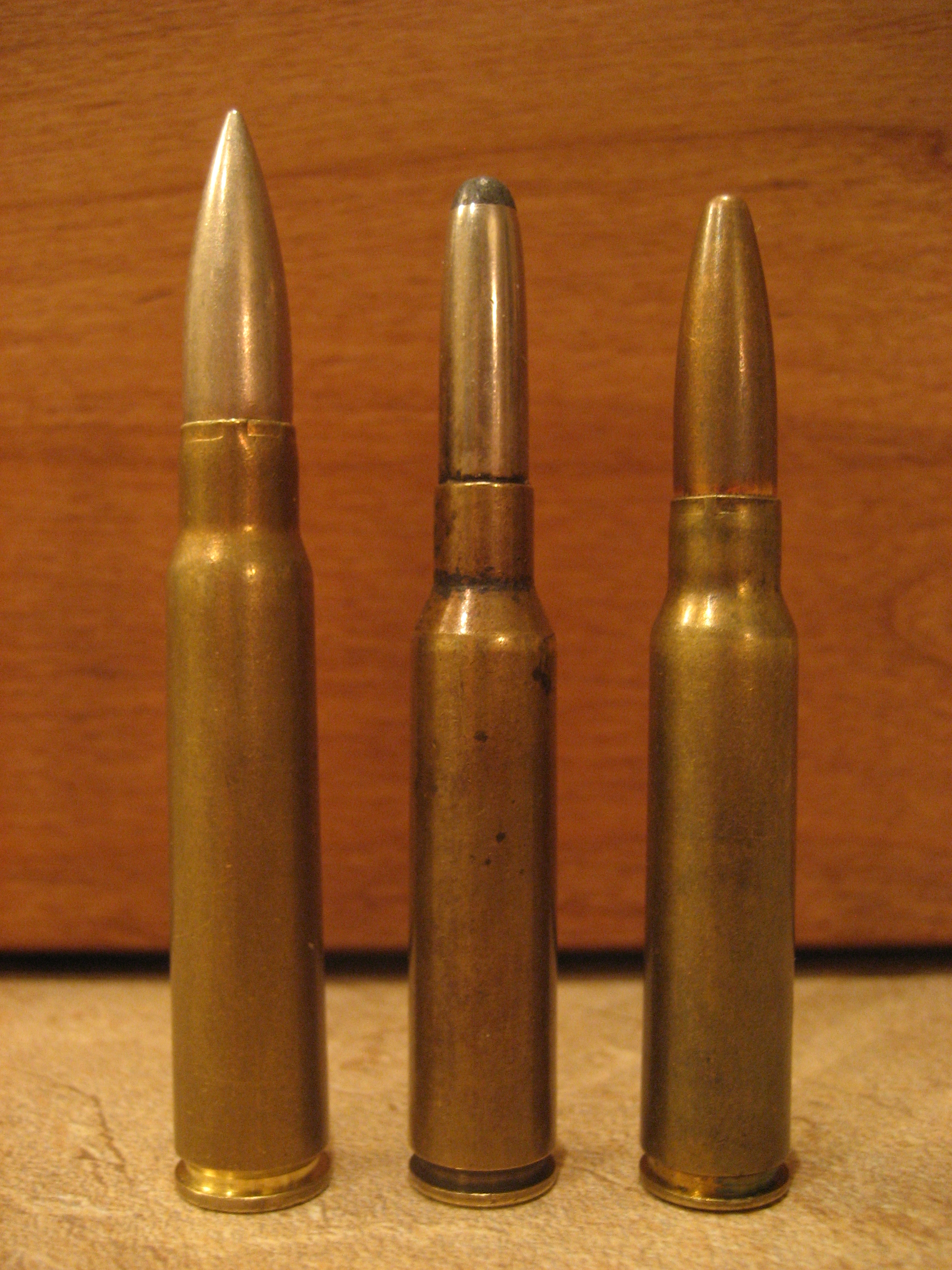
- From left, 8×57mm, 6.5mm Carcano and 7.35×51mm Carcano
- Type: Rifle
- Place of origin: Kingdom of Italy

Service history
- Used by: Italy, Finland, Nazi Germany
- Wars: World War II, Continuation War

Production history
- Designed: 1938

Specifications
- Parent case: 6.5 mm Carcano
- Case type: Rimless bottleneck
- Bullet diameter: 7.57 mm (0.298 in)
- Neck diameter: 8.32 mm (0.328 in)
- Shoulder diameter: 10.85 mm (0.427 in)
- Base diameter: 11.40 mm (0.449 in)
- Rim diameter: 11.40 mm (0.449 in)
- Case length: 51.50 mm (2.028 in)
- Overall length: 73.50 mm (2.894 in)
- Case capacity: 3.26 cm^{3} (50.3 gr H_{2}O)
- Rifling twist: 240 mm (1:9.45 in)
- Maximum pressure: 350 MPa (51,000 psi)

Ballistic performance
Bullet mass/type	Velocity	Energy
128 gr (8 g) FMJ	2,480 ft/s (760 m/s)	1,762 ft⋅lbf (2,389 J)

The 7.35×51mm Carcano is a rifle cartridge used by the Italian military during World War II.

It was designed during the 1930s to replace the 6.5×52mm Carcano used by the Italian military. Unlike the 6.5 mm, the 7.35 mm cartridge featured a Spitzer-style bullet to minimize air resistance in flight, however due logistical concerns during World War II, it never managed to replace the 6.5 mm round, which remained standard until 1945.

== Background ==
In 1891, the Royal Italian Army chose a 6.5 mm caliber cartridge using a round-nosed bullet of modest power, which was quite typical of the era. While most nations adopted spitzer bullets by 1908, Italy continued using round-nosed bullets, which quickly lost velocity and stopping power, decreasing effective range in comparison to spitzer bullets.

Following complaints during the Second Italo-Abyssinian War about the lack of stopping power and poor ballistics of the 6.5 mm round in rifles and machine guns, the Italians decided to adopt a larger bullet while keeping costs minimum as possible. Experiments were conducted at the Terni Arms Factory under the supervision of Colonel Giuseppe Mainardi with the cooperation of Bombrini-Parodi-Delfino and Società Metallurgica Italiana resulting in a satisfactory 7.35 mm bullet that could be loaded in a slightly modified 6.5×52mm Carcano cartridge case, with the first rifles chambered for the new cartridge being issued in 1938.

== Description and operational history ==
The 7.35×51mm Carcano cartridge uses a rimless, bottle-necked brass case and a Berdan primer, with a full metal jacketed lead alloy core 128 gr (8.3 g) bullet. The bullet also used a spitzer design with an aluminum tip, which was intended to make the bullet tumble after hitting the target, causing more damage.

With the outbreak of World War II, the Italian government decided to withdraw all 7.35 mm weapons from frontline service and re-issue old 6.5 mm weapons to reduce pressure on the already overburdened army logistics. The remaining 7.35 mm weapons were issued to militia units or sold to Finland. The latter were used during the Continuation War.

== See also ==
- Table of handgun and rifle cartridges
- 7.7×58mm Arisaka, a Japanese rifle round adopted during WWII for similar reasons as the 7.35×51mm Carcano
