= List of Italian Army equipment in World War II =

The following is a list of equipment used by the Royal Italian Army (Regio Esercito), Italian Air Force (Regia Aeronautica), and Royal Italian Navy (Regia Marina) during World War II.

== Bayonets ==
Model	Type	From:
M91/38 folding bayonet	Bayonet	1893
M91/38 standard bayonet	Bayonet	1891

== Small arms ==
=== Handguns ===
Image	Type	Maker	Rounds	Cartridge	From:	Weight	Number built	Comment
	Beretta Modello 1934	Beretta	7 (+1)	.380 ACP	1935	23.28 oz (660 g)	1,080,000	Remained in service until 1991.
	Beretta Modello 1935	Beretta	8 (+1)	.32 ACP	1937	23.5 oz (666 g)	525,000	Was a prized souvenir during the war. Remained in service until 1967.
	Glisenti Model 1910	Società Siderurgica Glisenti	7 (+1)	9mm Glisenti	1910	29,00 oz (820 g)	33,000 (5,000 Brixia 1913)	Was originally chambered for a 7.65×22mm bottle-neck cartridge, but the Italian Army requested it to be chambered in 9mm.
	Bodeo Model 1889 Revolver	Many manufacturers	6	10.35mm Ordinanza Italiana	1889	33.05 oz (950 g)	?	Italian manufacturers include: Societa Siderurgica Glisenti, Castelli of Brescia, Metallurgica Bresciana, Vincenzo Bernardelli of Gardone Val Trompia. During World War I, Spanish manufacturers, Errasti and Arrostegui of Eibar produced the Bodeo for the Italian government.
-	M1942 Sosso Pistol	FNA Brescia	21	9×19mm Parabellum	1942	?	?	Experimental design, was never fully adopted. Only five were manufactured, with four of them going to high-ranking Italian officials such as Vittorio Emanuele III and Benito Mussolini.

=== Rifles ===
Type	Base model	Maker	Rounds	Cartridge	From:	Produced	Weight	Comment
Carcano M1891	Carcano M1891	Carcano	6	6.5×52mm Mannlicher–Carcano	1891	2,063,750	3.9 kg	standard service rifle
Carcano M1891 Moschetto da Cavalleria (Cavalry Carbine)	Carcano M1891	Carcano	6	6.5×52mm Mannlicher–Carcano	1893	286,000	3.16 kg	integral, folding bayonet
Carcano M1891TS Moschetto per Truppe Speciali (Special Troop Carbine)	Carcano M1891	Carcano	6	6.5×52mm Mannlicher–Carcano	1897	590,000	2.9 kg	without bayonet
Carcano M1891/24	Carcano M1891	Carcano	6	6.5×52mm Mannlicher–Carcano	1924	260,000	2.79 kg	
Carcano M1891/28	Carcano M1891	Carcano	6	6.5×52mm Mannlicher–Carcano	1928	?	2.9 kg	
Carcano M1938 carbine	Carcano M1938 carbine	Carcano	6	7.35×51mm	1938	300,000	3.7 kg	converted to higher caliber cartridge
Carcano 91/38 (Modello 91/38) short rifle	Carcano M1938 carbine	Carcano	6	6.5×52mm Mannlicher–Carcano	1940	620,000	3.7 kg	reverted to original cartridge
Carcano M1891/41	Carcano 1891	Carcano	6	6.5x52mm Mannlicher-Carcano	1941	925,000	3.72 kg	
Steyr-Mannlicher M1895	Steyr-Mannlicher M1895	Mannlicher	5	8×50mmR Mannlicher	?	+200,000	3.8 kg	given by Austria as war reparations
M1870/87/15 Vetterli-Vitali	M1870 Italian Vetterli		6	6.5×52mm Mannlicher–Carcano	1916	700,000	4.2 kg	issued to colonial troops in Italian East Africa
Fucile Armaguerra Mod. 39	Fucile Armaguerra Mod. 39		6	6.5×52mm Mannlicher–Carcano, 7.35×51mm Carcano	1944	300	3.7 kg	

=== Submachine guns ===
Type	Maker	Rounds	Cartridge	From:	Rate of fire	Produced	Weight	Comment
Revelli Beretta M1918	Beretta	25	9mm Glisenti/9x19 Parabellum	1918	?	5,000	3.3 kg	Semi-automatic carbine
Beretta M1918/30	Beretta	25	9mm Glisenti/ 9x19 Parabellum	1930s	900 rpm	?	7 lb 3 oz (3.3 kg)	Semi-automatic carbine developed for police use. Issued in limited numbers to Guardia alla Frontiera and Milizia Forestale units.
Beretta Model 38	Beretta	40	9×19mm Parabellum	1938	600 rpm	1,000,000	9 lb 4 oz (4.2 kg)	Different box magazines had a capacity 10, 20 and 40 cartridges.
FNAB-43	FNAB	40	9×19mm Parabellum	1944	600-837 rpm	7,000	8 lb 12 oz (3.9 kg)	Magazines of 20 cartridges were also available. Was expensive to produce and so, only 7,000 were ever made.
OVP 1918	Officine Villar Perosa	25	9 mm Glisenti	1918	900 rpm	500	8 lb 0 oz (3,6 kg)	Was issued during the early 1920s; was mostly replaced by other models by the end of the war.
TZ-45	Fabbrica Fratelli Giandoso	40	9×19mm Parabellum	1944	800 rpm	6,000	7 lb 0 oz (3.2 kg)	Produced in small numbers (6,000 made between 1944 and 1945), design was later sold to the Burmese Army and produced as the BA-52.

=== Grenades ===
Type	Maker	From	Weight	Comment
SRCM Mod.35	Società Romana Costruzioni Meccaniche	1935	240 g	impact fuse hand grenade
OTO Mod.35	Odero Terni Orlando	1935	150 g	impact fuse hand grenade
OTO Mod.42	Odero Terni Orlando	1942	1100 g	Incendiary grenade
Breda Mod.35	Società Italiana Ernesto Breda	1935	200 g	impact fuse hand grenade
Breda Mod.42	Società Italiana Ernesto Breda	1942	1050 g	Anti-tank grenade
L Type	Odero Terni Orlando	1940	2040 g	Anti-tank grenade
P Bomb	Improvised Device	1941	2000g or 1000g	Anti-tank grenade

=== Flamethrowers ===
- Lanciafiamme Modello 35
- Lanciafiamme Mod. 41
- Lanciafiamme Mod. 41 d'assalto

== Machine guns ==
Type	Maker	Rounds	Cartridge	From	Rate of fire	Produced	Weight	Comment
Breda 30	Breda	20	6.5x52mm Mannlicher Carcano	1930	Theoretical:500 rpm Practical:150rpm	30,000 by 1940	10.6 kg	
Madsen	DISA	25	6.5x52mm Mannlicher Carcano	1908	450rpm	?	9.07 kg	Mostly used by carabinieri Model 1908,1910,1925 and 1930
Breda M37	Breda	20	8x59mm RB Breda	1937	450	?	19.4 kg (without tripod)	
Fiat—Revelli Modello 1914	FIAT	50 and 100	6.5x52mm Mannlicher Carcano	1914	250rpm	37,500	43.4 kg (fully loaded)	
Fiat—Revelli Modello 1935	FIAT	50	8x59mm RB Breda	1935	600rpm	?	40.8 kg (with tripod)	
FM 24/29	MAC	25	7.5x54mm French	1940?	450	?	8.9 kg	captured from France

- Breda M31 (licensed copy of the 13.2 mm Hotchkiss machine gun)
- Breda 38 8 mm tank machine gun
- SIA Mod. 1918 6.5 mm light machine gun
- Breda-SAFAT 7.7 mm machine gun
- Breda-SAFAT 12.7 mm machine gun
- Scotti–Isotta Fraschini Modello 1933 12.7 mm machine gun

== Artillery ==
=== Infantry mortars ===
Model	Caliber	Max. range	From	Produced	Weight, kg	fire rate, RPM	Comment
Brixia Model 35	45mm	530	1935	?	15.5	18	extremely accurate, 18 mortars per battalion (in 2 platoons)
Mortaio da 81/14 Modello 35	81mm	1500	1935	?	59.56	18	6 mortars per regiment, extended range (4 km) shell available

=== Field artillery ===
Italian artillery was usually designated using the calibre and length of the barrel in number of calibre lengths, so "90/53" would mean a weapon with a 90 mm diameter barrel where the length of the barrel was approximately 53 calibre lengths (i.e. 53x90 mm, that is 4.77 m).

Model	Caliber	Max. range	From	Number produced	Weight (kg)	fire rate RPM	Comment
Cannone da 47/32 M35	47mm	7,000 m (7,700 yd)	1935	?	315	5	dual-role anti-tank/infantry gun, adopted for many vehicles, licensed version of Böhler gun
Cannone da 65/17 modello 7	65mm	6800	1907	?	650	5	mountain gun
Cannone da 65/17 modello 13	65mm	6800	1913	?	650	5	mountain gun
Škoda 7 cm K10	66mm	5000	1912	?	520	10	naval gun redeployed as coastal artillery
Skoda 75 mm Model 15 (Obice da 75/13)	75mm	8250	1918	?	613	7	Austrian-built
Cannone da 75/27 modello 06	75mm	10000	1906	?	1080	5	licensed version of Krupp 1906M gun
Cannone da 75/27 modello 11	75mm	10240	1912	?	1076	5	French-designed
Cannone da 75/27 modello 12	75mm	10000	1912	?	900	5	modification of Cannone da 75/27 modello 06
Obice da 75/18 modello 34	75mm	9564	1934	?	1832	5	mountain gun
Obice da 75/18 modello 35	75mm	9564	1935	?	1832	5	field gun version of the Obice da 75/18 modello 34 with different carriage
Cannone da 75/34 modello 37	75mm	12500	1937	1	1250	5	prototype of 75/32 field gun, unmodified 75/34 Mod. S.F. went on as tank gun
Cannone da 75/32 modello 37	75mm	12500	1937	?	1250	5	dual-role anti-tank/field gun
Cannone da 77/28 modello 5/8	76.5mm	6100	1907	?	1065	9	built in Austria-Hungary, bronze barrel
Obice da 100/17 modello 14	100mm	8180	1914	?	1417	6	Austrian-built, in NATO service until 1984
Obice da 100/17 modello 16	100mm	8180	1916	?	1235	6	weight reduction of Obice da 100/17 modello 14 for use as mountain gun
Škoda 10 cm K10	100mm	15200	1910	?	2020	10	dual-purpose gun
Cannon 102/45	102mm	9300	1917	?	2327	7	naval gun converted to anti-aircraft gun
Cannone da 105/28 modello 12	105mm	8000 (12000)	1917	854	2650	5	license-built, kept in reserve until 1939
Obice da 105/14 modello 17	105mm	6000 (8100)	1917	120	1400	5	used in self-propelled gun
Cannone da 120/21	120mm	7700	1880	5	4050	5	fortress Krupp gun, used by Italian border guards
Obice da 149/12	149.1mm	8800	1914	1500	2344	3	Licensed copy of the 15 cm sFH 13
Cannone da 149/23	149.1mm	9300	1882	?	6050	1	fortress howitzer, most likely did not see combat in World War II
Obice da 149/12 modello 14	149.1mm	6500	1915	?	2700	1.5	Austrian-built Skoda howitzer
Obice da 149/13 modello 14	149.1mm	8800	1915	490	2765	1.5	Obice da 149/12 modello 14 modified for new ammunition
Cannone da 149/35 A	149.1mm	16500	1900	895	8220	1	No recoil absorber, zero traverse
Cannone da 149/40 modello 35	149.1 mm (5.87 in)	23,700 m (25,900 yd)	1940	63+?	11340	1-2	Replacement for Cannone da 149/35A but insufficient numbers built. Split trail
Obice da 149/19 modello 37	149.1mm	14250	1939	230	5780	3	Italian replacement for all older howitzers
15 cm/50 K10 Skoda	149.1mm	15000	1912	12	?	6	removed from Austrian battleship Tegetthoff and used in coastal defense
Cannone da 152/45	152.4mm	19400	1910	53	16672	1	Naval gun used in counter-battery fire and siege
Cannone da. 152/37	152.4mm	16000	1916	44	11900	1	built in Austria-Hungary
190/39 Skoda	190mm	20000	1904	29	12700	3	built in Austria-Hungary as naval gun, reused by Italians in coastal defense
Canon de 19 modèle 1870/93 TAZ	194mm	18300	1915	12	65000	2	A French railroad gun in Italian service.
7.5"/45 model 1908	191mm	22000	1908	24	13770	2.6	naval gun reused in coastal defense
203/45 Mod. 1897	203.2mm	18000	1897	40	11900	2.4	built for Giuseppe Garibaldi-class cruisers, used in World War II as siege gun and coastal defense
203/50 modello 24	203.2mm	30620	1924	26	11900	2.4	built for Trento-class cruisers, 1 turret used in coastal defence
Obice da 210/22 modello 35	210mm	15400	1935	20	24000	1	Production continued by Germans after surrender of Italy
Mortaio da 210/8 D.S.	210mm	8450	1900	?	10930	0.4	In Italian fortresses only
Mortario da 210/8 PIAT	210mm	8450	1900	?	10930	0.4	Towed version of Mortaio da 210/8 D.S.
Mortario da 210/8 FROM	210mm	8450	1900	?	10930	0.4	Improved mobility version of Mortario da 210/8 PIAT
Mortaio da 260/9 Modello 16	260mm	9100	1916	?	12560	1 round every 12 minutes	Italian version of a Schneider design.
Obice da 280	280mm	11600	1890	?	34070	?	Coastal defense and siege howitzer
Skoda 305 mm Model 1911	305mm	9600	1911	79	20839	0.18	Austro-Hungarian siege howitzer, received by Italy
305 mm /46 Model 1909	305mm	24000	1909		62500	2	naval gun used as coastal artillery
305/50 Mod. 1912	305mm	19000	1909	6	199900	1	naval gun used as coastal artillery
Škoda 30.5 cm /45 K10	305mm	20000	1911	65	620000	3	triple-mount Austrian naval gun used as coastal artillery
Cannone navale da 381/40 (coastal)	381mm	27300	1912	10	95000	1.75	naval gun used as coastal artillery
Cannone navale da 381/40 (railroad)	381mm	30000	1912	7	212000	1.75	naval gun used as railroad gun

See also:

- 203 mm /53 Italian naval gun - main gun on Italian cruisers

=== Anti-tank guns ===
Before and during World War II, Italy designed most of their anti-aircraft guns and some its infantry guns to also serve in the anti-tank role. No dedicated anti-tank gun was produced. Listed below is just the guns used in anti-tank role most commonly.

Model	Caliber	Penetration 100m (110yd)	Penetration 500m	Muzzle velocity	Max. range	From	Produced	Weight kg	fire rate RPM	Comment
Cannone da 37/54	37mm	?	?	700 m/s (2,300 ft/s)	6,000 m (20,000 ft)	1934	?	277	120	dual-role anti-tank/anti-aircraft gun
Cannone controcarro da 37/45	37mm	64 mm (2.5 in)	31 mm (1.2 in)	735 m/s (2,410 ft/s)	5,484 m (17,992 ft)	?	?	327	13	Italian imported Rheinmetall Pak 36
Cannone da 47/32 M35	47mm	58 mm (2.3 in)	43 mm (1.7 in)	630 m/s (2,100 ft/s)	7,000 m (23,000 ft)	1935	?	315	5	dual-role anti-tank/infantry gun, licensed version of Böhler gun
Cannone da 90/53 mod. 1939	90mm		190 mm (7.5 in)	850 m/s (2,800 ft/s)	17,400 m (57,100 ft)	1939	539	8950	19	dual-role anti-tank/anti-aircraft gun

== Infantry anti-tank weapons ==
- Fucile Controcarro 35(P) - Wz. 35 anti-tank rifle captured from Poland
- Solothurn S-18/100 anti-tank rifle
- Solothurn S-18/1000 anti-tank rifle
- Solothurn S-18/1100 anti-tank rifle
- Panzerfaust - one-shot disposable recoilless shaped charge launcher imported from Germany
- Lanciabombe Controcarro 60 mm - HEAT rifle grenade capable of penetrating 70 mm RHA at 80 m

== Anti-aircraft weapons ==
Model	Caliber	Effective altitude	From	Number produced	Weight, kg	fire rate RPM	Comment
Breda mod. 31	13.2 mm	1000	1929	?	47.5	400	used on command vehicles, licensed copy of the 13.2 mm Hotchkiss machine gun
Cannone-Mitragliera da 20/77 (Scotti)	20 mm	2000	1940	500	227.5	250	designed as aircraft cannon, build by Swiss Oerlikon
Cannone-Mitragliera da 20/65 modello 35 (Breda)	20 mm	2000	1935	?	330	240	twin mount, main Italian light AA/AT gun
Breda 37/54 mod. 32	37 mm	3500	1934	?	5000	120	naval gun with stabilizer
Breda 37/54 mod. 38	37 mm	3500	1938	?	4300	120	twin-barreled land version, without stabilizer
Breda 37/54 mod. 39	37 mm	3500	1939	?	1500	120	land version with recoil absorber
Breda 37/54 mod. 40	37 mm	3500	1940	?	312.5	120	re-navalized version with recoil absorber
QF 2-pounder naval gun (40/39 Vickers-Terni mod. 1915)	40 mm	3960	1917	50+	711	67	import and licensed production of "pom-pom" gun
Ansaldo Cannone da 65/64 modello 39	65 mm	5000	1939	115	?	20	
Cannone da 75/46 C.A. modello 34	75 mm	8500	1935	318	4405	15	used on Semovente 75/46 as anti-tank gun
Cannone da 75/50	75 mm	9200	1939	?	4150	15	Captured from Czech army in 1939
76/40 Mod 1916 RM	76.2 mm	5500	1916	492	1676	14	used in fixed AA positions from 1933
76/45 Mod 1911 RM	76.2 mm	6000	1911	312	2204	25	licensed version of "76 mm Mle 1911 Schneider"
Cannone da 90/53 mod. 1939	90 mm	11300	1939	539	8950	19	used on Semovente 90/53 as anti-tank gun
Cannone da 90/50 mod. 1939	90 mm	10800	1939	56	18750	12	navalized Cannone da 90/53 version
102/35 mod. 1914	101.6 mm	5700	1914	110	1220	7	used by the navy as coastal gun and on armored trains
120/27 OTO 1924	120 mm	5500	1924	5	?	9	removed from submarines, re-used in Messina AA battery

All calibers of AA guns were also mounted in portee trucks in dual roles (ground attack and AA).

== Vehicles ==
The Italian designation system for tanks consisted of a letter (L, M or P; designating light, medium and heavy tanks respectively) followed by two numbers: one giving the approximate weight in tons, the other giving the year it was accepted for service. Thus "M11/39" means the 11 ton medium tank of 1939. The Italian definitions of light, medium and heavy tank differ from other nations at the time. For instance the Italian "medium" tanks are often described as "light" in other sources.

=== Tankettes ===
Model	From	Armor max., mm	Primary armament	Secondary armament	Weight, t	Power, kW	Range, km	Produced	Crew	Comments
Carden Loyd Mark VI tankette	1929	9	2 × 8 mm machine guns	none	1.5	17	160	4	2	imported from the UK
L2/29 (CV-29)	1929	9	2 × 8 mm machine guns	none	1.5	17	160	21	2	minimal modifications of Carden Loyd Mark VI tankette
L3/33 (CV-33)	1933	14	Fiat Mod. 14 6.5 mm MG	none	2.7	32	110	300	2	all previous tankettes were upgraded in 1934 to CV-33 II Mod. 1934
L3/33 (CV-33 II Mod. 1934)	1934	14	2 × Fiat–Revelli Modello 1935 8 mm MG	none	2.7	32	110	?	2	mass production version
L3 Lf	1933	14	Flamethrower	Fiat–Revelli Modello 1935 8 mm MG	3.3	32	110	?	2	flame tank with towed fuel tank
L3/35 (CV-35)	1935	14	2 × Breda 38 8 mm MG	none	3.2	32	125	2500	2	armor bolted instead of riveted
L3/35 II	1935	14	2 × Breda 38 8 mm MG	none	3.2	32	125	?	2	doors and louvers modified for desert operation
L3/38	1935	14	Madsen machine gun (13.2 mm)	none	3.2	32	125	24	2	export variant, torsion bar suspension

The L3 tankette was also a basis for several engineering vehicles.

=== Tanks ===
Model	From	Armor max., mm	Primary armament	Secondary armament	Weight, t	Power, kW	Range, km	Produced	Crew	Comments
Panzer III Ausf N	1943	70	7.5 cm KwK 37 L/24	3 × 7.92 mm MG 34	23	220	155	12	5	12 imported from Germany, can fire HEAT rounds
Panzer IV Ausf G	1943	88	7.5 cm KwK 40 L/48	2 × 7.92 mm MG 34	25	220	200	12	5	12 imported from Germany
T-34/76	1941	60	76.2mm F-34 tank gun	2 × 7.62 mm DT machine gun	26.5	370	400	3	4	captured from USSR, used on Eastern front only
L5/21	1921	16	2x6.5 mm machine guns 3000A	6.5 mm machine gun	6	38.2	100	100	2	based on Renault FT, 1st Italian tank
L5/30	1930	16	37/40 gun	6.5 mm machine gun	6	38.2	100	52	2	weapon upgrade of L5/21
Carro Armato L6/40	1940	40	20 mm Breda 35	8 mm Breda 38 machine gun	6.8	52	200	283	2	designed for alpine combat, base for Semovente 47/32 SPG, flame tank version Fiat L6-40 LF
Renault R35	1940	43	37 mm L/21 SA18	7.5 mm MAC31 Reibel machine gun	10.6	62	130	124	2	French tank received via Germany
Renault FT	1940	22	MAC mle 1931 machine gun		6.5	29	60	3	2	Captured French light tank modified with MAC 31 machine guns
Somua S35	1941	47	47 mm SA 35 gun	7.5 mm Mitrailleuse mle 1931	19.5	140	230	32	3	French tank received via Germany, used in Italy for training only
Carro Armato M11/39	1939	30	37 mm Vickers-Terni L/40	2 × 8 mm Breda 38 machine gun	11.2	79	200	100	3	main cannon mounted in front hull below turret
Carro Armato M13/40	1940	42	47 mm Cannone da 47/32 M35	4 × 8 mm Breda 38 machine gun	13.5	93	200	c.2000	4	main cannon placed in turret, 1 AA machine gun
Carro Armato M14/41	1941	42	47 mm Cannone da 47/32 M35	2 × 8 mm Breda 38 machine gun	14	110	200	800	4	engine improvement of M13/40, machine guns ball turret removed
Carro Armato M15/42	1943	50	47 mm Cannone da 47/40 L40	4 × 8 mm Breda 38 machine gun	15.5	145	200	118	4	general improvement of M14/41, base for Semovente 75/34 gun
Fiat M16/43 ("Sahariano")	1943	50	47 mm Cannone da 47/40 L40	2 × 8 mm Breda 38 machine gun	16	208	300	1	4	Christie suspension used for first time in Italy
Carro Armato P26/40	1943	50	75 mm Cannone da 75/34	2 × 8 mm Breda 38 machine gun	26	310	280	103	4	base for Semovente 149/40 SPG, used by Germany, the Italian Social Republic, and the Italian partisans

=== Self-propelled guns ===
==== Tank-based ====
Name	Chassis	Gun	Developed	Number manufactured	Role
Semovente 47/32	Fiat L6/40	Cannone da 47/32 M35	1941	300	self-propelled AT gun
Semovente M41 75/18	M14/41	Obice da 75/18 modello 34	1941	262	self-propelled gun
Semovente 75/34	M15/42	75/34 Mod. S.F.	1942	190	self-propelled AT gun
Semovente M43 75/46	M15/42	Cannone da 75/46 C.A. modello 34	1942	15	self-propelled gun
Semovente M41M 90/53	M14/41	Cannone da 90/53	1942	30	self-propelled AT gun
Semovente M43 105/25	M15/42 tank	105mm howitzer	1943	121	self-propelled gun
Semovente 149/40	M14/41	Cannone da 149/40 modello 35	1942	1	self-propelled gun, prototype only
StuG III Ausf G	Panzer III	7.5 cm KwK 40	1940	0	self-propelled AT gun, 12 received from Germany

==== Others ====
During World War II, Italy regularly mounted cannons on portee trucks. Also, permanent installation of guns on trucks and armored cars were done on ad-hoc basis, therefore many self-propelled guns had no official name besides descriptive type of truck plus type of cannon. Below is the grossly incomplete list of these self-propelled weapons.

- Autocannone da 75/27 su TL37 - 75/27 mod.1911 cannon installed on TL 37
- 102/35 su Fiat 634N
- Autocannone da 75/27 CK su Ceirano 50 CMA - 75/27 CK gun on Ceirano 50 truck
- Autocannone da 90/53 su Breda 52 - 90/53 gun on Breda 52 chassis
- Breda 501
- Autocannone da 90/53 su Lancia 3RO - 90/53 gun on Lancia 3RO chassis
- L.3/Solothurn or L.3/cc (antitank) - changes made on several specimens directly from the operational departments in Italian North Africa in 1941. In place of the twin machine guns an S-18/1000 Solothurn 20 mm anti-tank rifle was mounted, which could penetrate the armor of British armored cars and light tanks.
- Chariot anti-tank gun or self-propelled L3 47/32 - prototype self-propelled gun armed with a 47/32 mm; trying "desperately" to adapt to the new demands of war the L3 Chariot had a very similar design to the Panzerjäger I (which was also derived from the most common light tank in the army of adoption, the Panzer I). The hull, superstructure private, had a front antitank gun 47/32 cowl, which was to protect the crew and the rest of the half was equal to the chassis of L .3, although the photo of the prototype seems that the suspensions were a mainspring. Probably would not be successful, since the recoil while content of 47/32 could, in the long run detrimental to the operation of the medium.

=== Armoured cars ===
Model	Maker	Developed	Produced	Armament	comments
Fiat 611 w/o gun	Fiat	1933	46	3 × Breda Mod. 5C 6.5 mm machine gun	had mobility and maintenance problems
Fiat 611 w gun	Fiat	1933	?	2 × Breda Mod. 5C 6.5 mm machine gun and 1 x cannone Vickers-Terni da 37/40 Mod.30	considered unsuccessful because was unable to fire forward with machine gun
Lancia IZM (Lancia IZ)	Lancia	1915	120	2 × 6.5 mm Maxim gun	all machine guns are detachable
Morris CS9	Morris Commercial Cars	1936	-	14.3mm Boys anti-tank rifle and 7.7 mm Bren light machine gun	some vehicles captured from British forces from 1940. equipped with radio, good mobility,
Lince	Lancia & Ansaldo	1942	263	Breda 38 8 mm machine gun	copy of British Daimler Dingo
Autoblindo 40 (AB 40)	Fiat&Ansaldo	1940	24	2 × Breda 38 8 mm machine gun	developed from Fiat-SPA TM40, most AB 40 upgraded to AB 41
Autoblindo 41 (AB 41)	Fiat & Ansaldo	1941	600	Breda Model 35 20mm gun	firepower improvement of Autoblindo 40 (AB 40)
Autoblindo 43 (AB 43)	Fiat & Ansaldo	1943	1	47mm 47/32 Mod. 1935	more powerful engine and armor added
SPA-Viberti AS.42 "Sahariano"	SPA-Viberti	1942	?	47mm 47/32 Mod. 1935 gun	scout car based on AB 41

=== Engineering and command ===
- L.3/r - command tank with radio inside, deployed in all tankette units
- L.3 carro recupero - experimental version for the recovery of damaged vehicles.
- L.3 da demolizione - radio-controlled prototype for the destruction of the minefields.
- L6/40 ammunition carrier
- L6/40 command tank

=== Trucks ===
==== Light trucks ====
- OM-32 Autocarretta da Montagna
- OM-36DM
- SPA TL.37
- SPA AS.37
- SPA CL39
- SPA TM40
- SPA Dovunque-35

==== Medium trucks ====
- Alfa Romeo 430RE
- Bianchi Miles
- Ceirano 50 CM
- FIAT-626 NM
- Isotta Fraschini D65
- Fiat-SPA 38R

==== Heavy trucks ====
- Alfa Romeo 800RE
- Breda 51
- FIAT-633NM
- FIAT-634N
- FIAT-666
- Fiat 661
- Isotta Fraschini D80
- Lancia Ro
- Lancia 3Ro
- Lancia EsaRo
- OM Taurus
- OM Titano
- SPA Dovunque 41

=== Passenger cars ===
- Alfa Romeo 6С2500 Coloniale
- Fiat 508CM
- Fiat 1100 (1937) (Balilla-1100 Coloniale)
- Lancia Aprilia Coloniale
- Bianchi VM 6C
- Fiat 2800 CMC

=== Motorcycles ===
- Benelli 500 M36
- Benelli 500 VLM
- Bianchi Supermil 500
- Gilera 500 LTE
- Moto Guzzi Alce
- Moto Guzzi Trialce
- Volugrafo Aermoto 125

=== Tractors and prime movers ===
- Breda-32 - wheeled artillery tractor
- Breda-40 - wheeled artillery tractor
- Breda-41 - wheeled artillery tractor
- Breda 61 - half-track artillery tractor, a licensed copy of the German Sd.Kfz. 7
- Fiat 727 - half-track artillery tractor
- L.3 trattore leggero - hypothetical version for towing the gun da. 47/32
- Pavesi P4 - wheeled artillery tractor
- Sd.Kfz.7 - half-track artillery tractor, 36 imported from Germany in 1943
- SPA TM40 - wheeled artillery tractor

=== Miscellaneous vehicles ===
- Carro Veloce 29 (armored car) - may be misspelled or fictitious (most likely this is the CV-29 tankette by the same name)

== Radars ==
Italy was late on the radar development; At the date of the armistice in 1943, 84 of 85 radars in operation were German-built. Italian Army and Navy have deployed a network of radar detectors and jammers though.

- ARGO - domestically developed air warning radar in Pratica di Mare Air Base
- FREYA - sold by Germans 1 July 1942, later transported to Sicily
- RTD Arghetto or Vespa - prototype of airborne 300 MHz radar

See also: Armi avanzate della Seconda Guerra Mondiale/Appendix 4 (wikibook)

== Cartridges and shells ==
- 6.5×52mm Mannlicher–Carcano
- 7.35×51mm Carcano
- 8×59mm Rb Breda
- 9mm Glisenti
- 9mm Corto (.380 ACP) (used for Beretta M1934)
- 7.65×17mm Browning (.32 ACP) (used for Beretta M1935)
- 9×19mm Parabellum (used for Beretta Modello 38)
- 10.35mm Ordinanza Italiana (used for Bodeo M1889)
- 7.5×54mm French (Captured)
- 7.92×107mm DS (Captured) (Used for the Wz. 35 anti-tank rifle)

== See also ==
- Military history of Italy during World War II
- Military equipment of Germany's allies on the Balkan and Russian fronts (1941–45)
- Regio Esercito
- List of Regia Aeronautica aircraft used in World War II
