= OD 82/SE =

Type of Hand Grenade

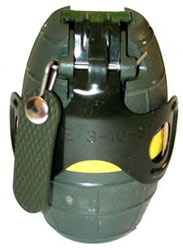
- Type: Hand Grenade
- Place of origin: Italy

Production history
- Manufacturer: Stabilimento Militare di Munizionamento Terrestre - Baiano di Spoleto
- Variants: OD/82-E-1 (blue) training

Specifications
- Mass: 285 g
- Height: 83 mm
- Diameter: 59 mm
- Filling: Composition B
- Filling weight: 112 g
- Detonation mechanism: time, delay of 4 second

The OD 82/SE is a hand grenade, currently issued to the Italian Army.

== History ==
In the 1970s and 1980s, it became necessary to replace the SRCM Mod. 35, which dated back to World War II. A first model of the new grenade, the OD/82-HE with its training version OD/82-E-1, was produced by the company "La Precisa S.p.A." Teano.

Adopted by the Army, production was immediately interrupted after many incidents (some fatal) of premature detonation.

The grenade was then modified by the Italian's army "Stabilimento Militare di Munizionamento Terrestre" (S.M.M.T.) of Baiano di Spoleto and was adopted by the armed forces as OD 82/SE.

The acronym OD stands for "Offense/Defense" (Italian: Offesa/Difesa), 82 refers to 1982, the year of production of the first model, the acronym SE stands for "Increased Safety (Italian: Sicurezza Elevata).

== Features ==
The OD 82/SE is a controlled fragmentation hand grenade, of both offensive and defensive type, with an ignition delay.

The safety distance is 21 metres, and the effectiveness at 5 metres is 85%.

The bomb body is khaki with a yellow line. A training model OD 82-E-1 is blue with a brown line.

== Adoption ==
The updating of the old model OD/82 HEs in storage to the new model was interrupted due to the explosion of the arsenal's "riservetta 73", which took place on 10 April 2005, where the old OD/82 that still needed to be updated were stored.

== Replacement ==
The replacement of the OD/82 began in 2013 with the MF-2000, produced at the factory of Stabilimento Militare di Munizionamento Terrestre di Baiano di Spoleto, its activation system is produced by SACIL srl of Pratissolo of Scandiano near Reggio Emlia.

== Users ==
- Italy

== See also ==
- Breda Mod.35
- OTO Mod 35
- SRCM Mod. 35
- Mk 2 grenade
- M67 grenade
- M26 grenade
- SFG 87
- Mecar M72
- Arges Type HG 84
- GLI-F4 grenade
- Stielhandgranate
- F1 grenade (Australia)

== See also ==
- SRCM Mod. 35
