= Fiat 665NM protetto =

Italian amored personnel carrier

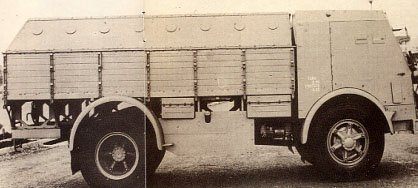
- A 665NM protetto in yellow sand coloration as originally intended for the African front.
- Type: Armored personnel carrier
- Place of origin: Kingdom of Italy

Service history
- In service: 1942–1945
- Used by: Royal Italian Army; National Republican Army; Wehrmacht
- Wars: World War II

Production history
- Manufacturer: Fiat Veicoli Industriali-Arsenale Regio Esercito di Torino
- No. built: 110
- Variants: Fiat 666

Specifications
- Mass: 9 t
- Length: 7.345 m (24 ft 1.2 in)
- Width: 2.73 m (8 ft 11 in)
- Height: 2.73 m (8 ft 11 in)
- Crew: 2
- Passengers: 20
- Armor: 7.5 mm
- Main armament: Breda 30 machine gun
- Engine: Diesel Fiat 366, 6-cylinder, direct injection, 9.365 L 110 hp (82 kW) at 2,000 rpm
- Transmission: 4×4
- Maximum speed: 57 km/h (35 mph)

The Fiat 665NM protetto (protected) or scudato (shielded) was a wheeled armoured personnel carrier, produced in Italy and employed during World War II by the Royal Italian Army, the National Republican Army and the Wehrmacht.

== History ==
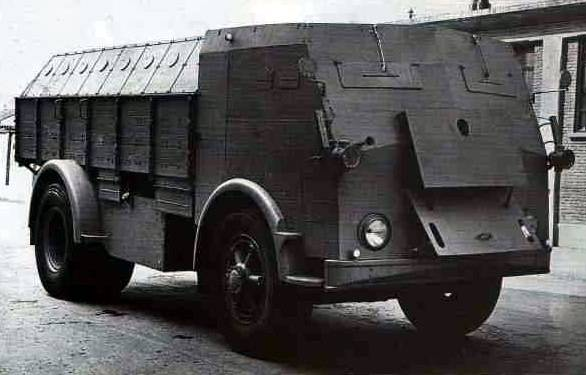
Armoured driver and commander seat

The vehicle was developed in 1942 at the Arsenale Regio Esercito di Torino in collaboration with Fiat Veicoli Industriali following the request of the Military Staff for a troop carrier to be issued to the armoured division on the African front. 300 were ordered but the Armistice of Cassibile stopped production in 1943 at 110 vehicles. Because of the landing of US troops in Tunisia. They never arrived on the African front, but were instead assigned to the 154th Infantry Division "Murge" and 13th Infantry Division "Re" and used in the Balkans against the partisan forces. After the armistice they were employed by the forces of the Italian Social Republic and by occupying Wehrmacht forces.

The vehicle, although only resistant to small arms fire, proved satisfactory for police functions in the occupied territories.

== Description ==
The vehicle is based on the Fiat 665 heavy truck, the diesel, four-wheel drive version of the Fiat 666. The mechanics remained unchanged, while the modifications involve armor with steel plates 7.5 mm thick, which ensured protection against small arms fire. The driver's seat was fully armored, with armored doors protecting the radiator and the windshield replaced by an armored panel with slits, that shielded the driver and the commander. The rear combat compartment retained the wood sides of the truck body, which were armored internally, while the upper part was made up of inclined plates and internally provided with eight slits per side and two on the back. The top of the combat compartment was open and was accessed via a rear ladder. The compartment could accommodate 20 soldiers, sitting on two benches placed along the sides of the compartment. The protection also extended to the fuel tank.

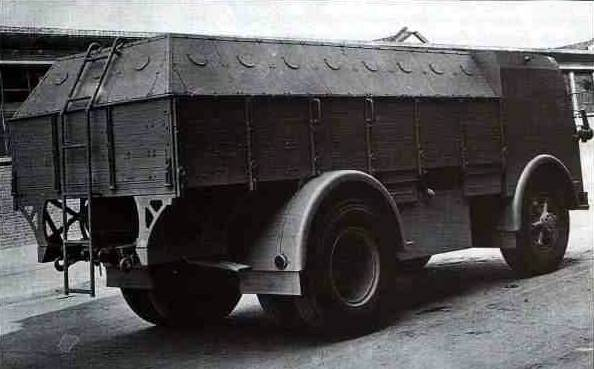
Rear view

Besides the individual weapons of the infantry which could be fired through the slits, generally every vehicle was equipped with a Breda Mod. 30 light machine gun.

== See also ==
- SPA Dovunque 35 protetto
- Fiat-SPA S37
