= Breda Mod. 42 =

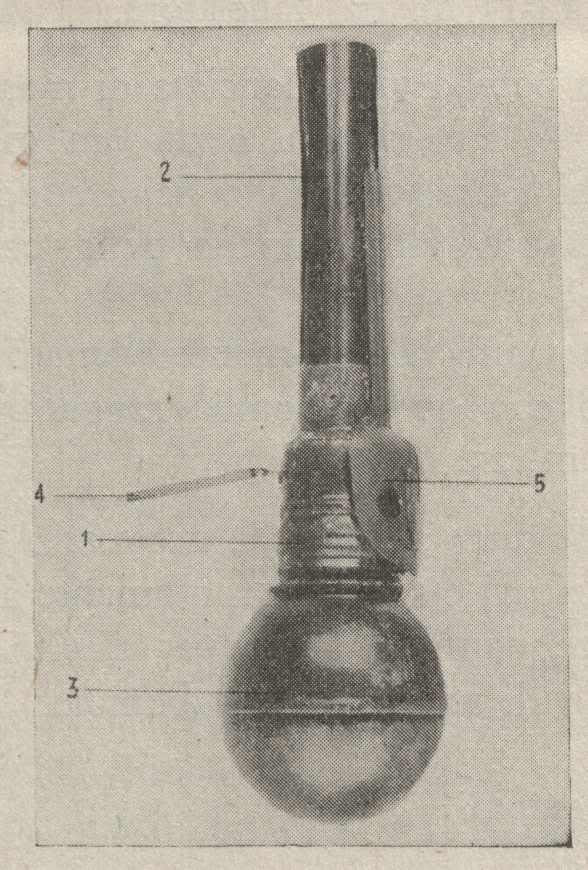
- Type: Anti-tank grenade
- Place of origin: Kingdom of Italy

Service history
- Used by: Royal Italian Army
- Wars: World War II

Production history
- Manufacturer: Breda Meccanica Bresciana
- No. built: 10,000

Specifications
- Mass: 1050 gr
- Height: 290 mm
- Diameter: 115 mm
- Filling: TNT
- Filling weight: 600 gr
- Detonation mechanism: Percussion on impact

The Breda Mod. 42 was an anti-tank grenade, developed by Breda, supplied to the Royal Italian Army during World War II.

== History ==
The Royal Italian Army had entered World War II war without an anti-tank grenade of domestic production. Only in 1942 were two models built: the OTO Mod. 42 and the Breda Mod. 42. This was achieved by modifying the Breda Mod. 40. In June 1942, the Breda Brescia produced 10.000 copies to be submitted to the high rank of the military, but the explosive device, due to numerous missing activations, did not pass the test carried out in April 1943.

With the creation of specific "tanks-hunters" units, which took place precisely in 1942, two types of anti-tank grenades were adopted, an explosive and an incendiary one. The first, the Breda mod. 42, employed mechanical parts of the normal Breda mod. 35. The second, the O.T.O. mod. 42, it was an improved version of the incendiary bottle with 600 grams of flamethrowers liquid, it was triggered by a normal hand grenade O.T.O. mod. 35 with slight modifications. The safety systems of the two bombs did not differ from those used on normal bombs and anti-personnel Breda O.T.O hand.

== Description ==
The bomb adopted the spool and the handle from Breda Mod. 40. To this it was added a spherical body bomb containing 574 grams of TNT. According to the manufacturer, the charge of TNT was able to pierce armor of 20 mm and chipping internally plates of 30 mm. It had to be launched at no less than 14–15 meters to allow the slipping of the safety of the trajectory that occurred after 10–12 meters. The final model instead adopted a bucket in sheet instead of the headphone retraction, thus reducing the time of the slipping of the automatic safety.

== Operational use ==
The throw was performed as follows: the ordinary security was removed from the spool, then the bucket of the automatic safety detached from the bomb, by gravity or under the action of a spring; the cross bar, dragged from the headphone weight was then slipped from its housing. This was true between the first 3–5 m. of the trajectory, after which the fuze, as capsule and percussor were kept spaced only by the spring, was run under conditions of impact against any resistant object and consequently of causing the deflagration of an extra charge contained in the sphere.

== See also ==
- SRCM Mod. 35
- Type L
- Passaglia Grenade
