= Passaglia Grenade =

P Bomb
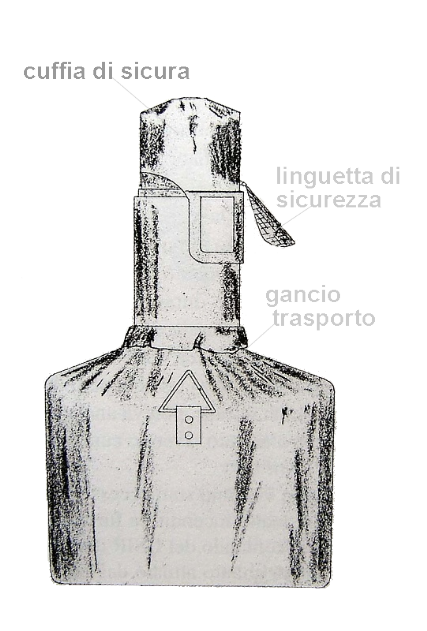
- Type: Anti-tank grenade
- Place of origin: Kingdom of Italy

Service history
- Used by: Royal Italian Army
- Wars: World War II

Production history
- Designer: Lieutenant Passaglia
- Designed: 1941
- Manufacturer: Improvised explosive devices
- No. built: 30000 produced on North African theater

Specifications
- Filling: TNT or Romite
- Filling weight: 1 kg or 2 kg

Passaglia Grenades, also known as P Bombs or Pazzaglia, are homemade weapons used by Italian soldiers during World War II, especially in the North African theater to overcome the chronic lack of effective weapons against armored enemies.

== Description ==
The bomb consisted of a block of explosive, into which was inserted a metal tube of about 7 cm containing an OTO Mod. 35 hand grenade (known to the British as the "Red Devil") to serve as a detonator. The whole assembly was then covered with a canvas bag fitted with a transport hook.

Built in two variants of 1 kg and 2 kg, they required a good physical strength for the launch because of the weight but they were only effective if launched precisely on the engine compartment, in which case they were able to destroy any armored vehicle. For this reason the soldier who wanted to use it necessarily had to approach the objective avoiding being hit by machine-gun fire on board or by the infantry who followed the tanks during their advance.

In 1942 samples of "Pazzaglia" Bombs were sent to be studied in Italy by the military engineering but they never were mass-produced in homeland factory.

== Operative use ==
For an effective launch the bomb must be handled with the right hand on the handle and using the left hand to withdraw the safe. To be properly launched it had to be thrown by standing up with a circular path from 'top down and possibly at least 20/25 mt.

Normally Italian soldiers, when they judged the distance of their objective, jumped out of their defensive positions (trenches or holes) and rushed to approach the tank. Other times crawling in between the moving carts and, to avoid being crushed by the tracks, even leaving that these would pass over them and then get up and launch their weapons after the tank had passed.

Besides the risk of being hit by enemy weapons or being crushed by the tracks, the same use of the bomb was dangerous because high flames immediately blazed with its explosion of the engine compartment, also hot hydraulic fluid squirted in all directions and ammunition inside the tank could explode.

Seeing in action the Italian Bersaglieri with their Passaglia, Erwin Rommel wrote in his commentary: «The German soldiers have impressed the world but the Italian bersaglieri have impressed the German soldiers».

== See also ==
- Breda Mod 42
- Type L
- OTO Mod 35
