= Type L grenade =

L type
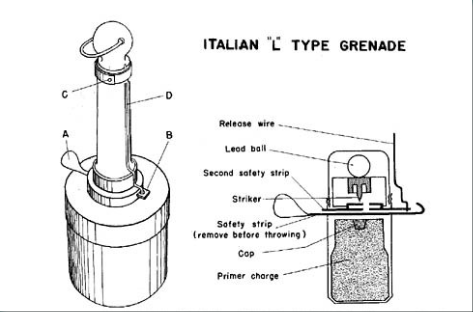
- Type: Anti-tank grenade
- Place of origin: Italy

Service history
- In service: 1940-1945
- Used by: Royal Italian Army
- Wars: World War II

Production history
- Manufacturer: Odero Terni Orlando

Specifications
- Mass: 2040 g
- Height: 320 mm
- Diameter: 120 mm
- Filling: TNT
- Filling weight: 1500 g
- Detonation mechanism: Percussion on impact

The Type L is an anti-tank hand grenade provided to the Royal Italian Army during World War II.

== Description ==
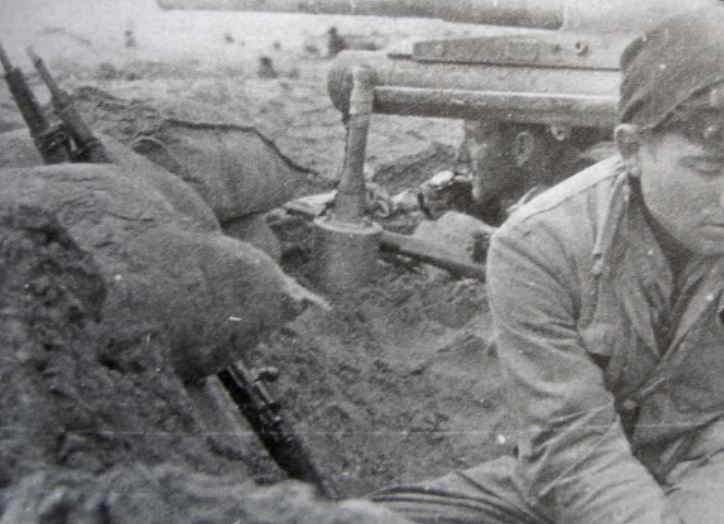
A Type L in a World War II picture

Designed for anti-tank use is practically an OTO inside a painted red cylindrical container filled with 1500 gr explosive charge with a wooden handle to facilitate the launch.

The type L is designed to be used against vehicles and tanks, the bomb had essentially the task of destroying the track to immobilize it, since the charge was insufficient for its destruction, but made the tank still vulnerable to possible attacks from the infantry, the soldiers at this point proceeded to place explosive charges or throw incendiary grenades into the engine compartment covered by some smoke grenade.

The bomb consists of a metal casing with a wooden throwing handle. On the upper part of the casing there is a tab for removing the safety pin, and a small metal strip protruding from the base of the handle. The strip is a second safety precaution. The metal strip is held in position by the wire on the side of the handle. This wire is held in position by a piece of wired tape secured by a pin.

== Operational use ==
Before launching the L type it is necessary to remove the metal tab security at the base of the cylinder containing the explosive charge, then, firmly holding the handle, remove the pin at the base of the handle. Make sure that the wire rewind safely. When the grenade is thrown, the wire releases the second safety pin.

== See also ==
- OTO Mod. 35
- SRCM Mod. 35
- Regio Esercito
- Breda Mod. 42
