= Fiat 666 =

Italian heavy truck

FIAT 666NM-RE
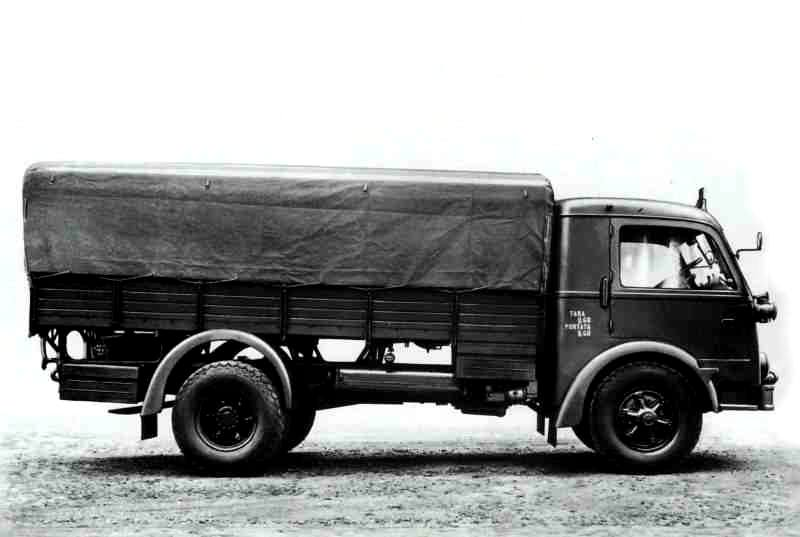
- Type: Heavy Truck
- Place of origin: Kingdom of Italy

Service history
- Used by: Regio Esercito; Regia Aeronautica
- Wars: World War II

Production history
- Designed: 1940
- Manufacturer: Fiat Veicoli Industriali

Specifications
- Mass: 6 t
- Length: 7,095 mm (279.3 in)
- Width: 2,350 mm (92.5 in)
- Height: 2,850 mm (112.2 in)
- Crew: 2
- Passengers: 20
- Engine: diesel Fiat 366, 6-cylinder direct injection, 9365 cm^{3}

The Fiat 666 was a heavy truck produced by the Italian Fiat Veicoli Industriali.

== History ==
The 666, like the corresponding medium-sized Fiat 626, was produced from 1940 as "Unified" truck: since 1937, by law, the War Department required all manufacturers of civilian trucks to have standard features regarding weight, number of axles, speed and capacity, in order to simplify logistics in case of requisition by the armed forces. The 626 and the 666, which replaced on assembly lines, respectively, the Fiat 621 and Fiat 632, were the first trucks of the Turin with forward control, and with the engine totally contained inside the cabin. The chassis was made of longitudinal members on two axles, with front-wheel steering and twin rear-wheel drive, and a wheelbase and track width of 3.85 meters by 1.84 meters. The truck had a Fiat 366, 6-cylinder 9365 cc, diesel engine, which developed 105 hp at 2000 rpm and was characterized by its innovative layout of guides that allowed a quick and simple replacement from the front. The gearbox had 4 forward speeds and one reverse speed with reduction gearing. Externally, it differed from the Fiat 626 only in size, the shape of the windscreen and the body. The trailers, with 6260 kg capacity (twice the 626), could carry 20 equipped soldiers.

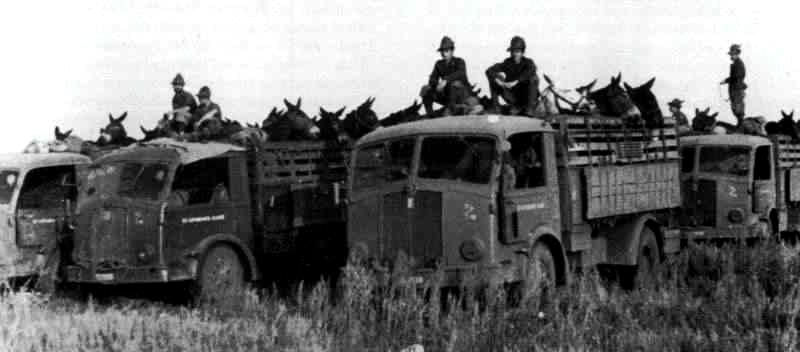
A Fiat 666 NM-RE Transport quadrupeds of Alpini in Russia.

The vehicle was produced from 1940 to 1945 in civil and NM (Nafta Military) 666N diesel versions (nafta) for the armed forces. In 1943, the BM version gasoline was approved for military use, but the armistice prevented production.

The civilian version, also available with a bus chassis, had enormous success, also being produced after the war as the Fiat 666N7, for a total production of 8000.

== Military use ==
The Fiat 666 was largely acquired by the Italian armed forces: the N-RE version for the Royal Italian Army and the N-RA for the Royal Italian Air Force were captured in different outfits, such as the Bus, Car, Tanker, Fire Engine, Transport quadrupeds, with portacarri trailers Viberti and Bartoletti. After the Armistice of Cassibile 79 NM were produced for the Germans who occupied the Fiat facilities in north Italy. Among the units supplied to the forces of the Italian Social Republic, there is evidence of at least one 666 armored, handcrafted from the arsenal of Piacenza, with a turret armed with a 12.7 mm Breda-SAFAT machine gun and supplied to the Republican National Guard.

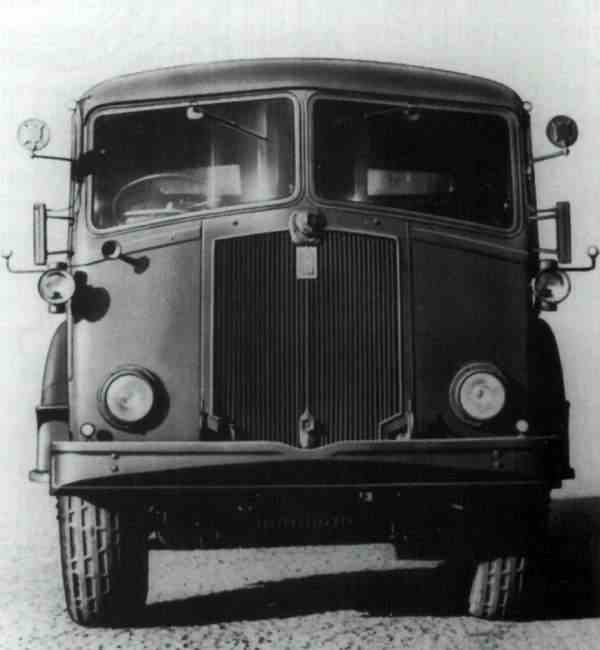
A Fiat 665nm, recognizable by parascocca.

== Fiat 665NM ==
In 1941 a military-wheel drive version of Fiat 666NM diesel was produced. The vehicle maintained maximum commonality with rear-wheel drive versions and went into production for the armed forces in 1942. After the armistice, 2 copies were produced for the Wehrmacht.

In 1942 an armoured personnel carrier version was made, called Fiat 665NM protected or shielded, used against Yugoslav partisans first, and then in northern Italy.

== Technical features ==
Model	Years of production	Engine Type	Engine size cm^{3}	Power	Gross vehicle weight rating (in tonnes)
Fiat 665NM - truck, military diesel, 4×4	1942 - 1944	Fiat 366	9365	110 at 2000 rpm	12.4
Fiat 666N - truck, autobus, diesel	1939 - 1946	Fiat 366	9365	100 to 2000 rpm	12.2
Fiat 666NM-RA - truck, military bus diesel	1940 - 1945	Fiat 366	9365	105 at 2000 rpm	12
Fiat 666NM-RE - truck, military bus, diesel	1940 - 1945	Fiat 366	9365	95 at 2000 rpm	12
Fiat 666N7 - truck, bus, diesel direct injection	1946 - 1948	Fiat 366/345	9365	113 at 2000 rpm	13.4

== See also ==
- Fiat 665NM protetto
- Fiat 626
- Fiat 632
