= Fiat 6640A =

Fiat 6640 AMDS, Fiat 6640A, Fiat 6640G (depending on the year)
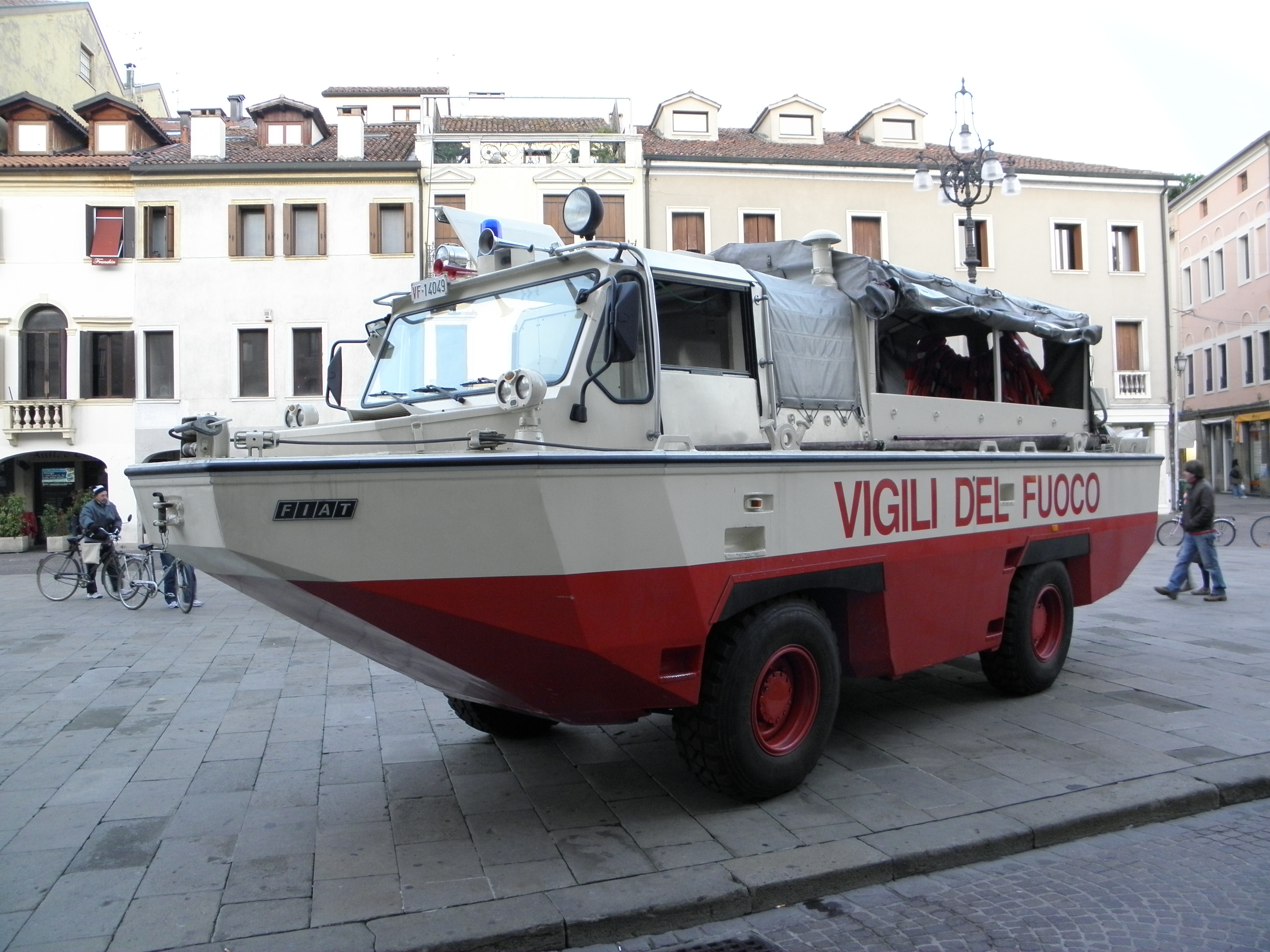

Overview
- Manufacturer: Fiat Veicoli Industriali, later Iveco
- Assembly: Italy

Body and chassis
- Class: Amphibious utility vehicle
- Layout: front-engine RWD / 4×4

Powertrain
- Engine: inline 6 diesel, 5,499 cc (335.6 cu in), 195 hp
- Transmission: 5x2 forward speeds; PTO propeller drive

Dimensions
- Length: 862 cm (339 in)
- Width: 250 cm (98 in)
- Height: 305 cm (120 in)
- Curb weight: 6,450 kg (14,220 lb)

The Fiat 6640A is an Italian wheeled amphibious armoured vehicle produced from the early 1950s to the 1980s for the Italian government.

The 6640A carries a crew of two, protected by four mm (0.16 in) thick armour, and is powered by a six-cylinder diesel engine providing a top speed of 90 km/h (56 mph) on land and 11 km/h on water, with a range of 750 km on land and 60 km on water. The 6640A was later replaced with the 6640G, which has a more powerful engine and longer wheelbase.
