= OTO Mod. 42 =

Italian incendiary anti-tank grenade

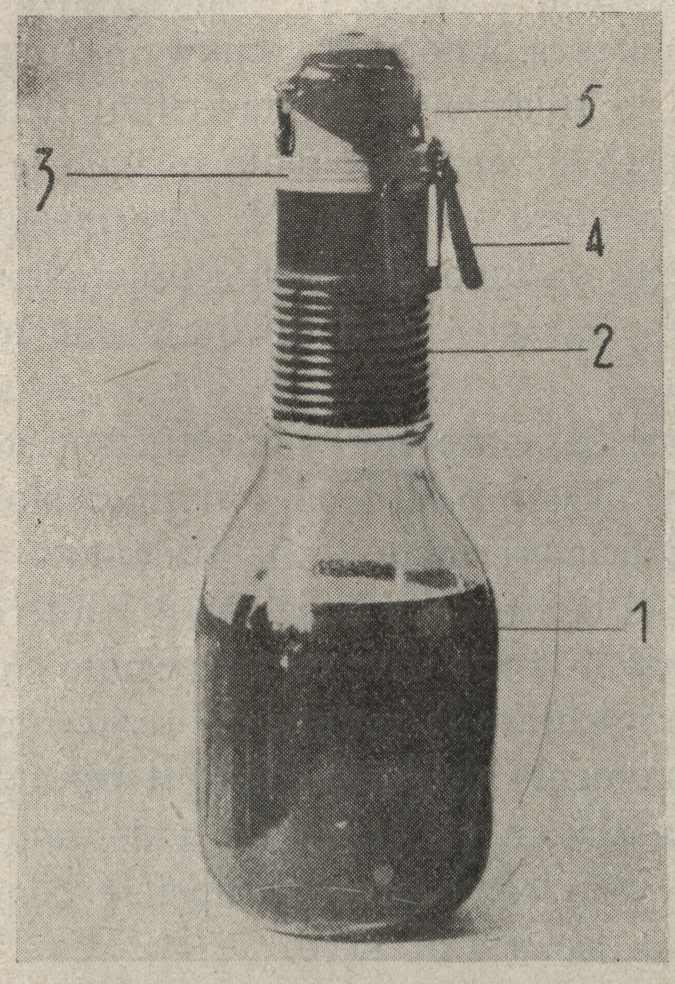
- Type: Incendiary grenade
- Place of origin: Kingdom of Italy

Service history
- Used by: Royal Italian Army
- Wars: World War II

Production history
- Manufacturer: Odero Terni Orlando

Specifications
- Mass: 1100 g
- Filling: 50% Flammable liquid and 50% Gasoline
- Detonation mechanism: Percussion

The OTO Mod. 42 is an incendiary anti-tank hand grenade used by the Royal Italian Army during World War II.

== History ==
At the beginning of WWII, Italy lacked a domestically produced anti-tank grenade. The OTO Mod. 42 originated from improvised molotov cocktails created by Italian soldiers from normal OTO Mod. 35 grenades. By 1942, the Breda Mod. 42 and the OTO Mod. 42 were in production.

== Features ==
The Mod. 42 consists of a normal OTO Mod. 35 hand grenade that is internally threaded and screwed to an aluminum handle. At the bottom of this handle is a glass container loaded with flammable liquid and gasoline, which shattered upon impact or when the detonator was activated.

In order for the incendiary liquid to be as effective as possible, users were trained to hit the air vents of the targeted tank's engine.

== See also ==
- OTO Mod. 35
- Regio Esercito
