= Volugrafo =

Italian automobile manufacturer

Officine Meccaniche Volugrafo was an Italian company that manufactured a miniature motorcycle during the Second World War and briefly produced a small car in Turin after the war. The company also made trailers, aircraft parts, and petrol pumps.

== Miniature motor cycle ==
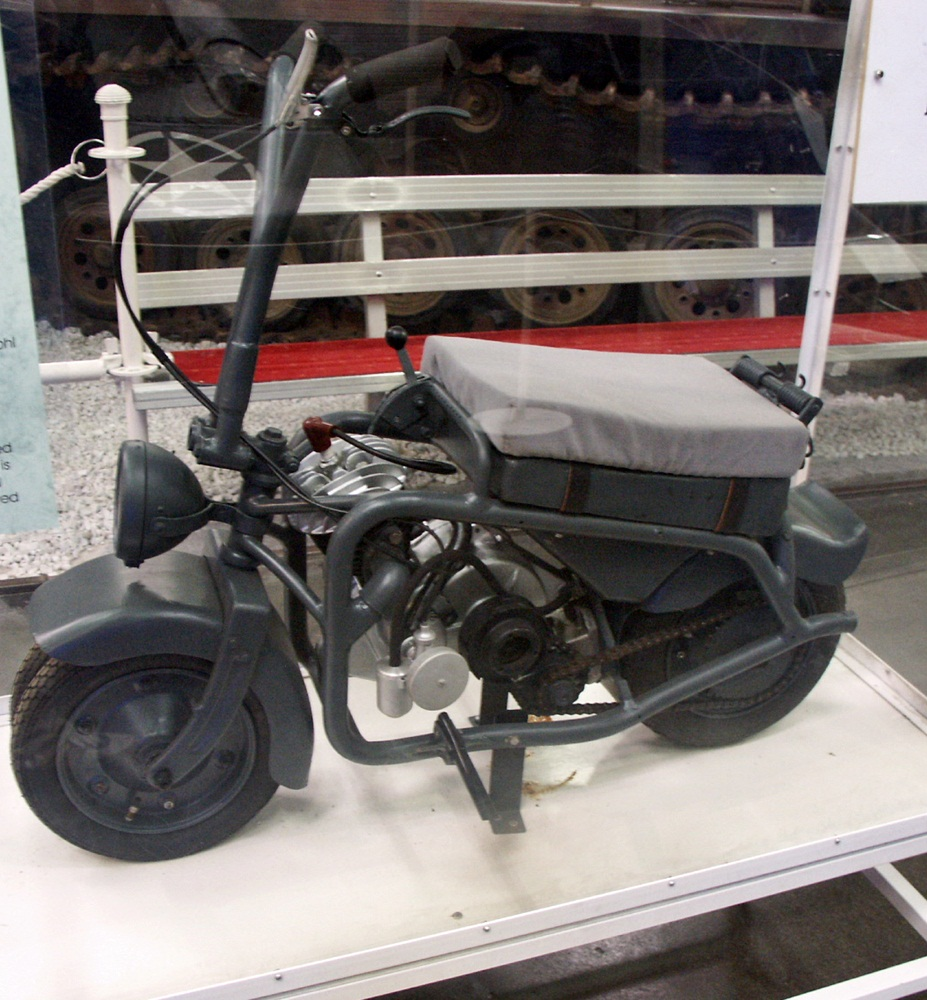
Aeromoto 125

The Volugrafo Aermoto 125 (Aermoto air-launch "Volugrafo") was a parachutable motorcycle produced in 1942 for the Italian Army. It was originally conceived in 1936 as a light motorcycle by Claudio Belmondo. At the outbreak of World War II, the Axis Powers began planning Operation C3 for the invasion of Malta. The Italian Army wanted a parachutable motor bike for the operation. Belmondo redesigned the lightweight motorbike as the Aeromoto 125 to meet the Army's requirements. The prototype was made by in 1942 and went into production the following year. The Army ordered a first batch of 600 Aermotos, destined for one of the battalions of the 183rd Paratroopers Division Ciclone, which was being set up in the Tarquinia area in the summer of 1943. The motorcycle also equipped the Tarquinia parachute school, the San Marco Regiment and, after the Armistice of Cassibile, the Paratroop Swimmers (NP) of the Decima Flottiglia MAS. The production, after the bombing of the Turin Volugrafo plants, was moved to Favria and continued until 1944 reaching a total of 2000 made. The Germans bought up these motorbikes, both by taking them from the 183rd Paratroopers Division Ciclone, and by continuing their production; they were assigned in particular to the paratroop units of the Luftwaffe engaged on the Adriatic coast and in the area of Rome.

The frame is double cradle, rigid, in tubular steel . The engine is a 123 cm^{3} two-stroke single cylinder, delivering 2 HP at 3600 rpm (bore 52 mm, stroke 56 mm, compression ratio 1:6). Dell'Orto T2 / 16 single control carburetor with diaphragm for closing the starting air (jet 80, diffuser 16). Ignition with alternator/magnet, left rotation flywheel Bosch type ULA 1 CL 27 with fixed advance. The exhaust gases are channeled into the frame tubes. The transmission is by chain, the gearbox is two-speed with gearbox and drum brakes. The tires of the two wheels are twinned. The seat is fixed to the 9.5 liter tank, capable of accommodating only one paratrooper; a small two-wheeled trolley (Aviolanciabile trolley type "AV") can be hooked to a spherical support and can be used for the transport of a second soldier or of materials and ammunition. In the launch configuration, the handlebar is folded forward on the front wheel; the bike thus takes the shape of a paralleled pipe and can be inserted into the special container, to which the parachute is attached. After landing, conditioning (removing from the container and straightening and locking the handlebar in the running position) takes just two minutes.

== Automobiles ==
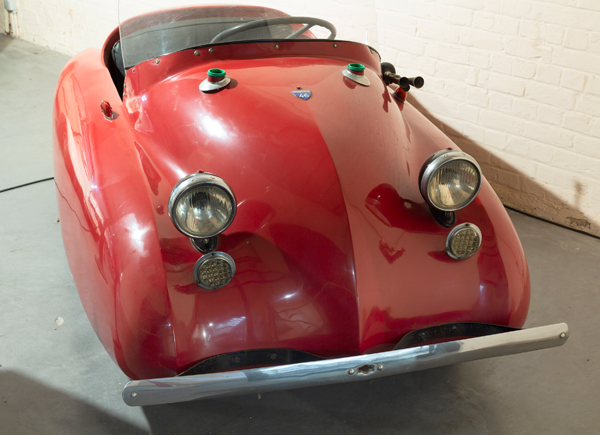
Bimbo 46

Belmondo developed the vehicle called Volugrafo Bimbo 46, in November 1945 and produced from spring 1946. Production ended in 1948 after about 60 were made. The vehicle had a tubular frame and a narrow track of only 78 cm. The fully encased front wheels were guided on double wishbones of equal length, and steering from the large steering wheel positioned slightly left of the centre was transmitted by a chain. The open, doorless body contained a bench on which two people could sit next to each other in an emergency. The vehicle was 2.4 meters long and 90 centimeters high. There was a thin fabric top without side panels as weather protection. It was powered by an air-cooled single-cylinder 125cc engine of 5 HP (3.7 kW) driving the left rear wheel. There was also a sports version equipped with a second drive set on the right rear wheel.

At least five vehicles have survived, two being exhibited in the Musée Communal de l'Automobile Mahymobiles in Leuze-en-Hainaut and in the Museo Ford Gratton in Farra d'Isonzo (Italy) respectively.

== Literature ==
- Semi-tracked vehicles, motor vehicles and special vehicles of the Italian Royal Army 1919/1943, Giulio Benussi, Intergest, 1976.
- Engine characteristics and instructions for use and maintenance, Aermoto Volugrafo Torino, G.Bonino TO - mod.4C, SD but approx. 1942.
- Walter Drawer: Small Cars International . Motorbuch-Verlag. Stuttgart 1999.
- Harald H. Linz, Halwart Schrader : The International Automobile Encyclopedia . United Soft Media Verlag, Munich 2008, ISBN 978-3-8032-9876-8
