= SPA Dovunque 35 =

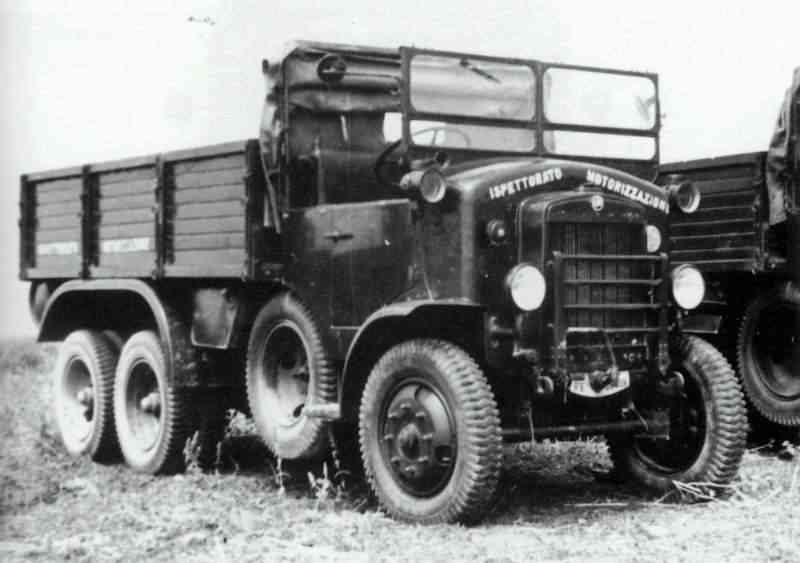
- Type: Truck
- Place of origin: Kingdom of Italy (1861–1946)

Service history
- Used by: Regio Esercito; Regia Aeronautica
- Wars: World War II

Production history
- Manufacturer: Società Piemontese Automobili
- Produced: 1935-1950
- Variants: SPA Dovunque 35 protetto

Specifications
- Mass: 4530 kg
- Length: 5,030 m
- Width: 2,070 m
- Height: 2,910 m
- Crew: 2
- Passengers: 20
- Engine: Fiat 18T Gasoline, 4 Cylinder da 4053 cm³ 55 hp
- Fuel capacity: 290 km
- Maximum speed: 60 km/h

The SPA 35 is an Italian light off-road truck vehicle produced in Italy by S.P.A. and used by the Royal Italian Army and the Regia Aeronautica during World War II and by the Italian Army in the postwar period. Dovunque is Italian for "anywhere" signifying that the vehicle is capable of travelling cross-country, "35" refers to the year of production.

== History ==
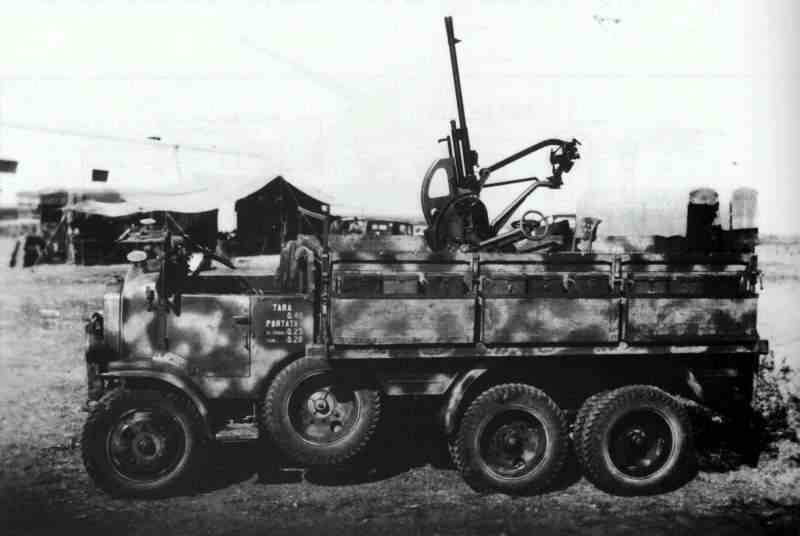
Autocannon Breda 20/65 Mod. 1935 installed on a 35 Dovunque of 42nd Artillery Regiment, 61st Infantry Division "Sirte".

The first Autocarro Dovunque ("cross-country vehicle") was the SPA Dovunque 33, produced from 1933. It was found during the Ethiopian War that this vehicle was underpowered and too light. The SPA Dovunque 35 was an improved version which solved these problems. A version with enclosed cab was also acquired by the Regia Aeronautica.

The vehicle was used in the Spanish Civil War and at the outbreak of World War II was available in considerable quantities. It was used extensively in Italian North Africa, the theater for which it was designed, and on the Russian front. Its main role was for towing light artillery, but numerous other special versions were also built.

After the Armistice of Cassibile, the production of the vehicle also continued under the control of the Germans with 307 units, for the Wehrmacht. Production continued until 1948 with the Italian Army, and it remained in service until 1950.

In 1941, the SPA further developed the project, resulting in the SPA Dovunque 41, with increased weight and engine power. This was produced both in heavy off-road truck version and heavy artillery tractor version.

== Technical changes ==
The chassis and bodywork were substantially those of Fiat Dovunque 33. The improvements chiefly concerned the motorization, with the replacement of the original 122B 46 hp engine with the more powerful Fiat SPA-18T gasoline 4-cylinder 4053 cc, disbursing 55 hp at 2000 rpm, giving a road speed of 60 kilometres per hour (37 mph). The suspension was strengthened. The brakes were one hydraulic pedal, acting on six wheels, and one manual agent to the transmission. The empty weight increased to 4530 kg and the payload to 2500 kg. The wooden banks in the trailer are closed, unlike the Dovunque 33 where they were at spaced axes.

== Versions ==
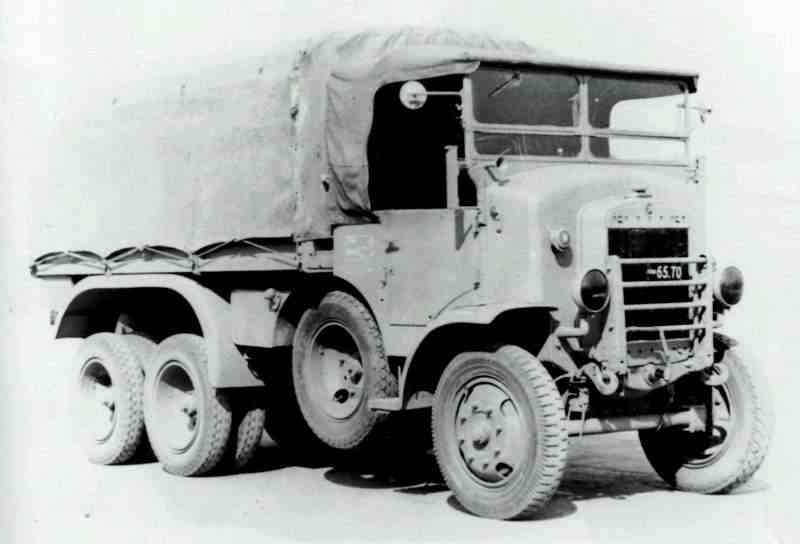
SPA 35 Dovunque in the colonial livery.

- Basic version: trailers with 2500 kg capacity or 25 equipped soldiers.
- Regia Aeronautica version: rigid closed cabin.
- Autocannon version: obtained with the installation (often in the field) of a heavy machine gun Breda 20/65 Mod. 1935, for the anti-aircraft protection of convoys.
- Mobile Watchtower version Mod. 41.
- Dovunque-Viberti Center Radio version: cab version from Viberti, equipped with radio Magneti Marelli RF2 CA and R6, which operates in long, medium and short-wave, with a radius of respectively 500, 1000 and 5000 km.
- Mobile Photo Lab version.
- SPA Dovunque 35 protetto: Armored personnel carrier designed in 1941 and produced in 1944.

== Bibliography ==
- Gli Autoveicoli del Regio Esercito nella Seconda Guerra Mondiale, Nicola Pignato, Storia Militare.
- Gli Autoveicoli tattici e logistici del Regio Esercito Italiano fino al 1943, II tomo, Stato Maggiore dell'Esercito, Ufficio Storico, Nicola Pignato e Filippo Cappellano, 2005.
