= Isotta Fraschini D65 =

Overview
- Manufacturer: Isotta Fraschini
- Production: 1940–1955
- Assembly: Milan, Italy

Powertrain
- Engine: 5330 cc diesel inline 6 (D65) gasoline (D65 2/4)

Dimensions
- Length: 5,870 mm (231.1 in)
- Width: 2,160 mm (85.0 in)

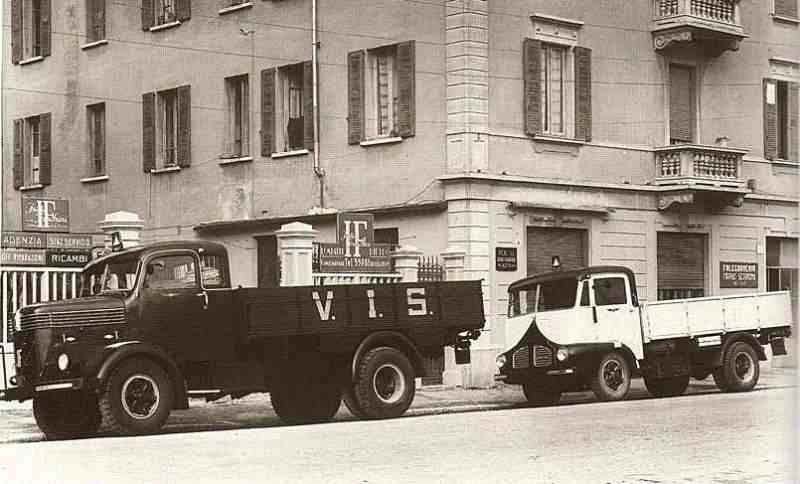
Isotta Fraschini D80 (left) & D65 (right)

The Isotta Fraschini D65 is a truck built in Italy from 1940 to 1955.

The Milan-based company Isotta Fraschini (IF), a producer of luxury cars, airplane, and naval engines had acquired through German company MAN SE the production license of Diesel engines. In 1934 they entered the truck market with the D80 heavy truck and in 1940 launched the D65 which was a commercial success, remaining in production until 1955. It was available as a chassis for special equipment, including buses, by numerous bodies of the time, some of which had Zagato cabins.

== Technical information ==
Two engines were available in the IF D65. A 5330 cc four cylinder diesel producing 78 horsepower at 1900 rpm. and the D65 2/4 got an 80-horsepower gasoline four cylinder.

== Military version ==
The IF D65 started Military service in the Italian Royal Army in 1942 with a standard diesel version. On September 3, 1943 the introduced the petrol version called D65 2/4. After the war, the truck remained in service with the Italian Army until the end of the 1950s.

== See also ==
- Isotta Fraschini (the company)
- Isotta Fraschini D80
- List of aircraft engines
