= Breda Mod. 35 hand grenade =

Breda Mod.35
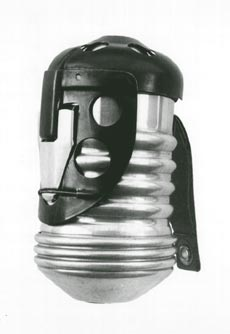
- Type: Offensive type grenade
- Place of origin: Kingdom of Italy

Service history
- In service: 1935–1945

Production history
- Manufacturer: Breda Meccanica Bresciana
- Variants: Breda Mod. 40

Specifications
- Mass: 200 g (7.1 oz)
- Height: 96 mm (3.8 in)
- Diameter: 58 mm (2.3 in)
- Filling: TNT or dinitronaphthalene
- Filling weight: 63 g (2.2 oz)
- Detonation mechanism: Percussion on impact

The Breda Mod. 35 is a hand grenade issued to the Royal Italian Army during World War II.

== History ==
Entered into service in 1935, the Breda Mod. 35, together with the SRCM Mod. 35 and the OTO Mod. 35 represented the new generation of hand grenades with which the Royal Italian Army faced the Second World War.

Alongside its OTO and SRCM counterparts, the Breda Mod. 35 was commonly known as the 'Red Devil' by Allied troops in the North African campaign for being painted bright red and their tendency to sometimes fail to detonate upon hitting the ground; Allied soldiers reported that disturbing dud grenades could activate the fuse, which led to the 'Devil' part of the nickname.

== Design ==
The Breda Mod. 35 is an offensive type hand grenade, made up of an aluminium cylindrical body with the two trunk-conical shaped ends of, painted red and loaded with 63 g (2.2 oz) of TNT-dinitronaphthalene that at the time of the explosion projects splinters in a radius of 10 m (33 ft).

The device consists of the charge carrier, the detonator, the capsule and the needle carrier. It has two safeties, an ordinary one consisting of a rubber flap attached to a plate with two branches, and an automatic one consisting of headphones, cross bar and brass tape delay.

At the moment of use the ordinary security is flipped and the grenade thrown, the headset is reversed causing the disrolling of delay tape, finally dragging the crossbar to safety.

At this time the bomb is ready to explode, as soon as the collision with the ground overcomes the resistance of the antagonist spring, it causes the advancement of the pin that strikes the capsule, triggering the explosion.

== Versions ==
=== War ===
Painted red.

=== Inert ===
Painted burnished.

=== Charge reduced for training ===
Painted white with red stripe.

=== Breda Mod. 40 (type 1) ===
Differed from Mod. 35 for the bursting charge which is constituted by autarchic explosive based on ammonium nitrate, being very hygroscopic, is contained in a watertight charge carrier.

=== Breda Mod. 40 (type 2) ===
Not to be confused with the previous one.

The other Mod. 40 model is constituted by a normal Mod. 35 mounted on top of a wood or bakelite handle, in style of German bombs. The total length of the bomb then goes to 241 mm (9.5 in).

The headphone safe is replaced by a bucket that upon release of the handle, is released from a spring and is released in the air. The bomb body finally is made of steel instead of aluminum. This version was developed into the Breda Mod. 42 anti-tank version.

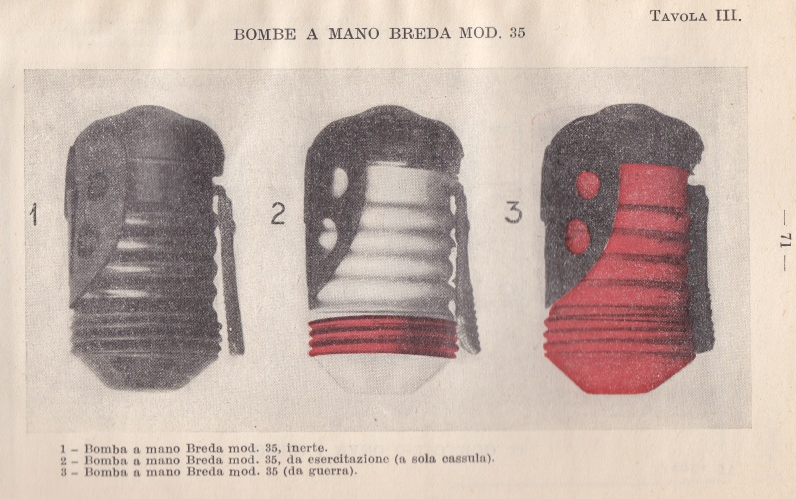
Table from the Royal Italian Army's field manual

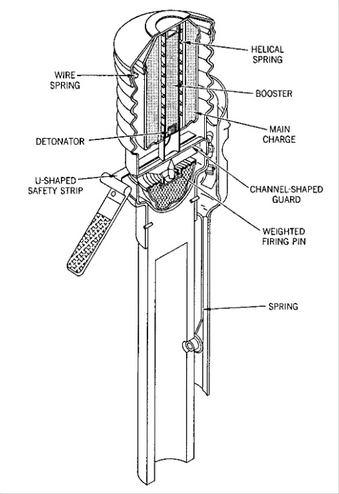
breda Mod.40 info table

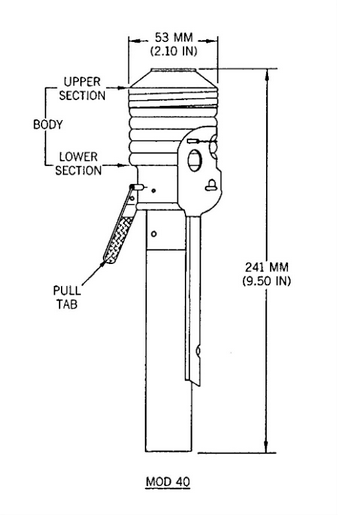
another breda Mod.40 info table

== Users ==
- Kingdom of Italy
  - Regio Esercito

== See also ==
- OTO Mod. 35
- SRCM Mod. 35

== Bibliography ==
- Armi della fanteria italiana nella seconda guerra mondiale by Nicola Pignato, Albertelli, 1971
- Le armi e le artiglierie in servizio by F. Grandi, 1938.
