= Isotta Fraschini D80 =

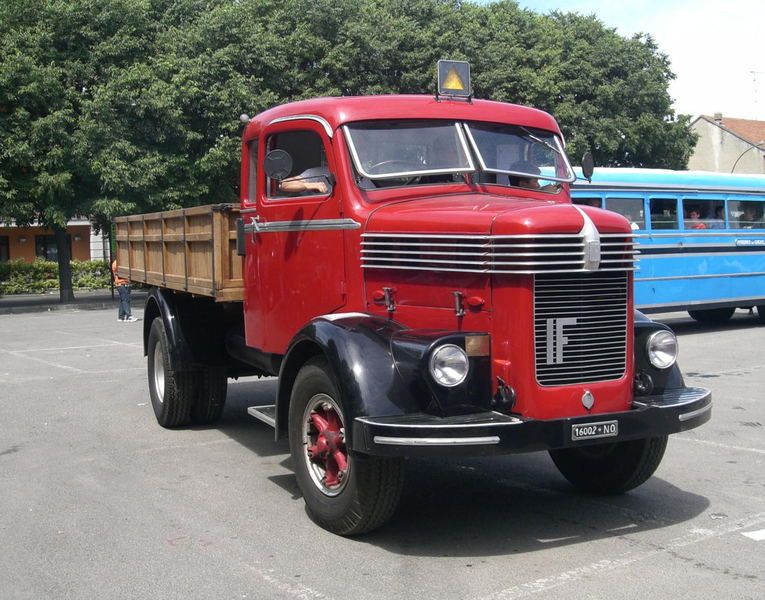

Overview
- Manufacturer: Isotta Fraschini; Fàbrica Nacional de Motores
- Also called: FNM R-80; FNM D 7.300
- Production: est. 6000
- Model years: 1934–1955
- Assembly: Italy: Milan; Brazil: Rio de Janeiro

Powertrain
- Engine: 7,274 cc diesel I6

Dimensions
- Length: 7,240 mm (285.0 in)
- Width: 2,350 mm (92.5 in)
- Height: 3,000 mm (118.1 in)
- Curb weight: 5,500 kg (12,125 lb)

The Isotta Fraschini D80 (civilian version) is a large truck built in Italy from 1934 to 1955, the Isotta Fraschini D80 NM (military version) was built only in 1935.

== History ==
In the 1930s the Italian company Isotta Fraschini (IF), which specialized in the production of luxury cars, airplane, and naval engines had acquired through German company MAN SE the production license of Diesel engines. In 1934 they got in the truck market with the D80 heavy truck. In 1935 they added the D80 NM ("Nafta Militare" i.e. Army, Diesel fuel), immediately adopted by the Italian Royal Army. They were also used by the Italian Corpo Truppe Volontarie in the Spanish Civil War. In 1937 the Isotta Fraschini D65 was added. These two trucks are known as the 1st series.

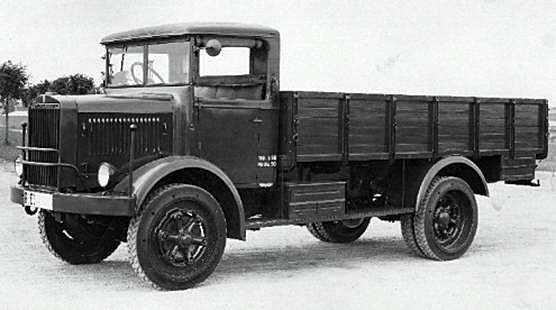
Isotta Fraschini D80 NM (initial military version)

Following the unification decree of 1937, which required manufacturer to standardize certain properties (weight, capacity, number of axle, speed) in relation to any requisition for the war effort, in 1939 the Milanese house changed the rules thus allowing unified production of Isotta Fraschini D80 CO (civilian version) and D80 COM (military version) both known as the 2nd series.

After World War II, the 3rd series went into production for the civilian market. In 1949, Brazil's Fàbrica Nacional de Motores (FNM) bought the rights for the production of the truck, and produced it there as the 'FNM R-80', then as 'FNM D 7.300'. It was FNM's first road vehicle, the company having been founded to manufacture aircraft engines and other products. Around 200 examples were built there, with 30 percent local parts content.

== Bus models ==
The D80 was also used as a bus chassis, as a luxurious coach. It used the same 7.3-litre diesel straight-six as the truck, delivering 105 hp (77 kW) at 2,000 rpm. Power was delivered through an eight-speed gearbox (a four-speed with a splitter, including two reverse gears).

== Technical information ==
The D80 is a heavy four-wheel truck with twin, driven rear wheels. The cab, built by Zagato, is conventional, right-hand drive. On the nose, five chrome strips start from the badge in the center of the grille continue along the sides of the bonnet. The engine is a four-stroke Diesel straight-six with 7.3 L (7,274 cc; 443.9 cu in) displacement and delivered 95 hp (70 kW) at 1,900 rpm in the pre-war specifications. The frame, supporting a 6.5 tons payload has a 4.10 m (13.5 ft) wheelbase and axle tracks of 1.78 m (5.8 ft) (front) and 1.77 m (5.8 ft) (rear). Bore and stroke are 105 mm × 140 mm (4.13 in × 5.51 in).

The D80 CO and COM of the "2nd series", "unified" in accordance with the provisions of the Government, are characterized by a low fuel consumption and the presence of booster air. Outwardly, the CO and COM civilian and military have the same cabin with rounded corners, but they differ in the nose: the civilian model has an oval-shaped grille, while in the military is rectangular. While the civilian model is equipped with an electric starter, the military D80 NM was produced with a manual crank starter and only received an electric starter a few years into World War II.

== See also ==
- Isotta Fraschini (the company)
- Isotta Fraschini D65

== Bibliography ==
- The Vehicles tactical and logistic of the Royal Italian Army until 1943, vol. II (Italian), the Army, Historical Office, Nicola and Philip Pignato Chaplain, 2005.
