= SPA Dovunque 35 protetto =

SPA Dovunque protetto
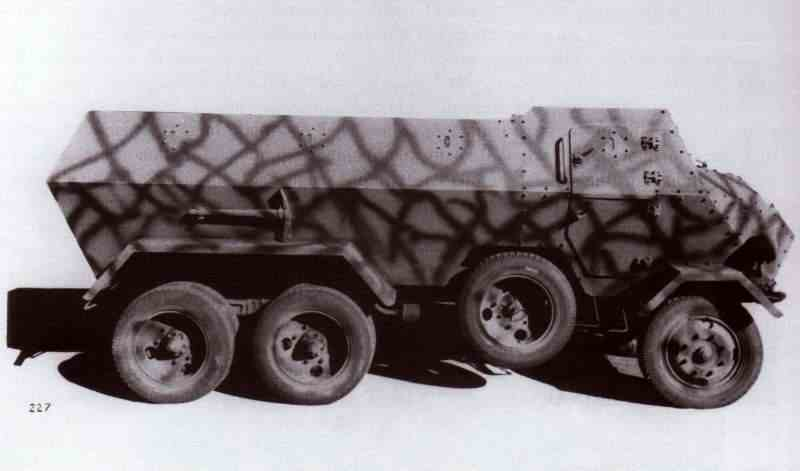
- Type: Armored personnel carrier
- Place of origin: Kingdom of Italy

Service history
- In service: 1944
- Used by: Black Brigades

Production history
- Designer: Viberti
- Manufacturer: Società Piemontese Automobili
- No. built: Limited

Specifications
- Mass: 4,700 kg (10,400 lb)
- Length: 5.30 m (17 ft 5 in)
- Width: 2.00 m (6 ft 7 in)
- Height: 2.35 m (7 ft 9 in); 2.50 m (8 ft 2 in) in the covered version
- Crew: 2+10
- Armour: 10 mm frontal armour 8 mm side and rear armour
- Main armament: 8 mm Fiat-Revelli Mod. 14/35
- Engine: 18T gasoline, 4-cylinder, 4053 cm³ 55 hp (41 kW)
- Power/weight: 11,70 hp/t
- Transmission: 6x4
- Fuel capacity: 285 km (177 mi)
- Maximum speed: 45 km/h

The SPA Dovunque 35 prottetto (Italian for anywhere and protected) is a wheeled armored troop carrier, produced in Italy and employed by the Black Brigades of the Italian Social Republic during World War II.

== History ==
Since 1938, within the Royal Italian Army, there was emerging a requirement for a transport vehicle for the troops and for the Bersaglieri infantry regiments of the armored divisions. The Viberti introduced since in 1941 a prototype based on the SPA Dovunque 35 truck, however, technical doubts (the excessive weight of the armor on the chassis) and doctrinal questions on the use of such vehicle not turned the project into a contract. The prototype remained in Viberti workshops until 11 November 1944, when it was requisitioned by the Black Brigade Ather Capelli of Turin.

Meanwhile, in 1942 the final version was set, with the top of the transport compartment covered. With the pressure of events in April 1945, the samples still being built at Viberti workshops, both covered top version and uncovered, were requisitioned by the various factions. At least three were taken by Republicans of the Social Republic. Two vehicles were captured by the Italian partisans, one was destroyed by a Panzerfaust from a legionary of the 29th Waffen Grenadier Division of the SS (italienische Nr. 1) (the Italian SS division).

== Description ==
The vehicle is based on the chassis of the off-road truck 6x4 SPA Dovunque 35 extensively modified. The general approach, with the walls of the transport compartment angled, is inspired by the German half-tracks Sd.Kfz.251. The hull is made from riveted steel clad plates with a thickness of 10 mm. The engine, in frontal position, is protected by a short snout with angular fins in the radiator protection. In the cabin are placed on the right the driver and on the left the crew commander; the view is guaranteed by two windows protected by armored door; access to the cabin is guaranteed by two side door. The rear of the cabin continues with the transport compartment, in which can sit up to 10 soldiers on benches placed against the sloping walls. The team can access the vehicles from a rear door that can be opened into two elements. The soldiers on board can use personal weapons through four slits on each side of the vehicle and two on the back. The final draft was expected to Armored cover both the cabin and the transportation compartment, with three large doors available to the crew, but on the pictures received such coverage never appears.

== Gallery ==
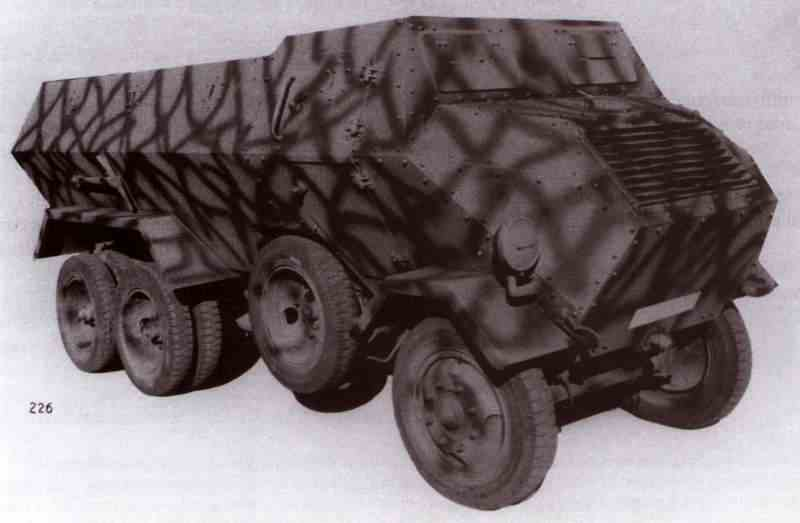
3/4 view.

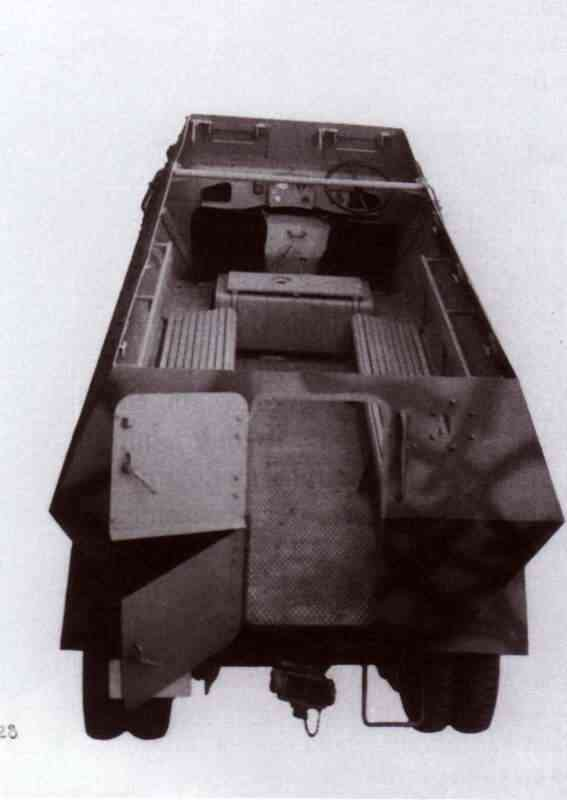
fighting compartment and cabin.

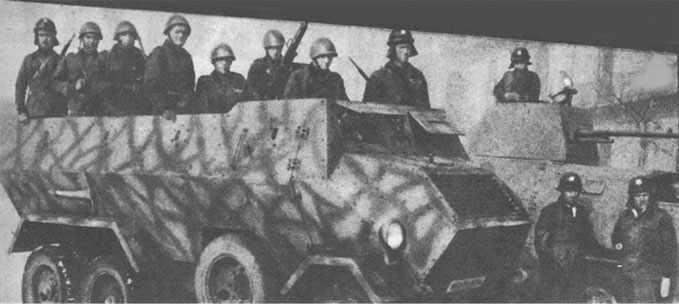
SPA with Black Brigades on it

== See also ==
- SPA Dovunque 35
