= SRCM Mod. 35 =

SCRM Mod. 35
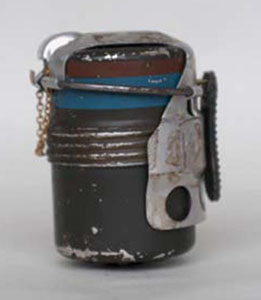
- Post-war produced khaki colored training version
- Type: Hand grenade
- Place of origin: Kingdom of Italy

Service history
- In service: 1935–1990
- Used by: See § Users
- Wars: World War II

Production history
- Manufacturer: Società Romana Costruzioni Meccaniche
- Produced: 1935–2012

Specifications
- Height: 85 mm (3.3 in)
- Diameter: 57 mm (2.2 in)
- Filling: TNT or dinitronaphthalene
- Filling weight: 43 g (1.5 oz)
- Detonation mechanism: percussion

The SRCM Mod. 35 is a hand grenade that was first issued to the Royal Italian Army in 1935, serving through World War II and into the 1990s.

== Description ==
The SRCM Mod. 35 is an offensive-type hand grenade meaning that it scatters light shrapnel, lethal within a radius of less than the maximum distance of the throw, its purpose being to cover the advance of the thrower without the thrower having to seek cover. Typical throwing range is 20–25 m (66–82 ft) and the effective range of the shrapnel 10–15 m (33–49 ft). The outer shell of the grenade is aluminium, containing 43 g (1.5 oz) of TNT and dinitronaphthalene with an internal wire wrapped around it that turns into shrapnel at the time of the explosion. It has two safeties, a manual one consisting of a crossbar with brass handle and an automatic one, consisting of a cross bar of aluminium connected to an external handle.

The SRCM was activated by yanking on a rubber tab that freed a safety ring. Once hurled into the air, a safety cap partially encasing the brightly painted aluminium body, disengaged and partially armed the grenade. A small chain inside the cap acted as a second safety, pulling away and preparing the grenade for detonation.

Unlike almost all other grenades of the 20th century, it did not use a timed chemical reaction to ignite the explosive filler. The grenade, once its safety disengaged, would explode on impact.

The SRCM had a small shutter built into the case. Only when the grenade struck a surface with sufficient force would the shutter move, allowing a striker inside the grenade to ignite the explosive filler. It was designed to explode, sending shrapnel out, no matter how the grenade landed.

During the war the SRCM were also used as anti-personnel mines with appropriate modifications. Mounted without the safety, inside a tubular structure with a protruding pin that worked as striker. When stepped on the striker depressed into the tube hitting the grenade fuze.

== History ==
In the mid-1930s, Italy adopted three hand grenades of vaguely similar design: the SRCM Mod. 35, the OTO Mod. 35, and the Breda Mod. 35; each one made by a different manufacturer in order to quickly stockipile grenades to support the government expansionist aims.

Alongside its OTO and Breda counterparts, the SRCM Mod. 35 was commonly known as the 'Red Devil' by Allied troops in the North African campaign for being painted bright red and their tendency to sometimes fail to detonate upon hitting the ground; Allied soldiers reported that disturbing dud grenades could activate the fuse, which led to the 'Devil' part of the nickname. Some Commonwealth troops removed the SRCM fuse assembly and explosive charge and modified the grenade body into an improvised oil lamp for their dugouts. After the Armistice of Cassibile it was adopted as the Handgranate 328 by the German forces in Italy.

The SRCM remained in service after World War II; In 1982, the Italian Army adopted the OD-82 (Offensiva-Difensiva) grenade to replace it, though production was only discontinued in 2012. The SRCM was also used by the armed forces of Malta (supplied by MIATM).

== Versions ==
Post-war produced grenades were painted a khaki color and using the same colored lines scheme for the various versions.

Version	Description
War	Red colored shell.
War Regia Marina	White with red stripe, loaded with TNT.
Smoke	Yellow during the war, after the war red; recognizable by many big holes on the outer shell.
Smoke Incendiary	For operational use, without holes, red upper half, lower half black with lettering on the bottom F and F1, respectively.
Charge reduced for training	Red with brown and blue stripes, charge is a mixture of 5 g (0.18 oz) of smoke, handle without the internal shrapnel wire.
HE	Red with yellow line, high-potential TNT charge.

== Users ==
- France
  - French Army
- Nazi Germany
  - Wehrmacht
- Kingdom of Italy
  - Regio Esercito
  - Regia Aeronautica
  - Marina Militare
- Malta
  - Armed Forces of Malta

== See also ==
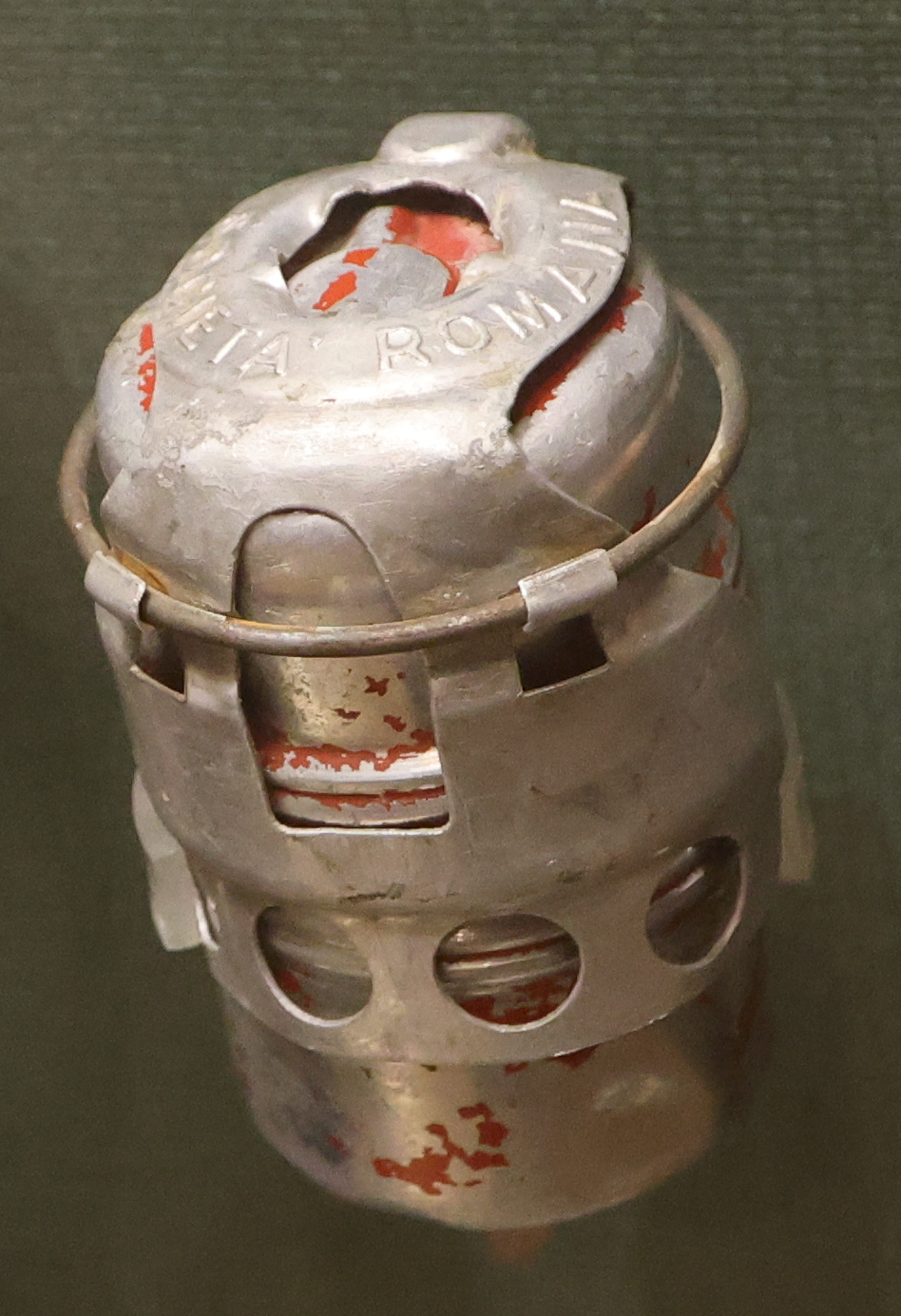
Grenade recovered during the Aden Emergency

- Breda Mod.35
- OTO Mod 35
- Granata OD 82/SE
- Mk 2 grenade
- M67 grenade
- M26 grenade
- SFG 87
- Mecar M72
- Arges Type HG 84
- GLI-F4 grenade
- F1 grenade (Australia)

== Bibliography ==
- Istruzione Sulla Bomba a Mano S.R.C.M Mod. 35 ad effetto ridotto, Stato Maggiore Esercito, 1972
- Le armi e le artiglierie in servizio di F. Grandi, ", 1938
