= Fiat 626 =

Italian medium truck in World War II

FIAT 626
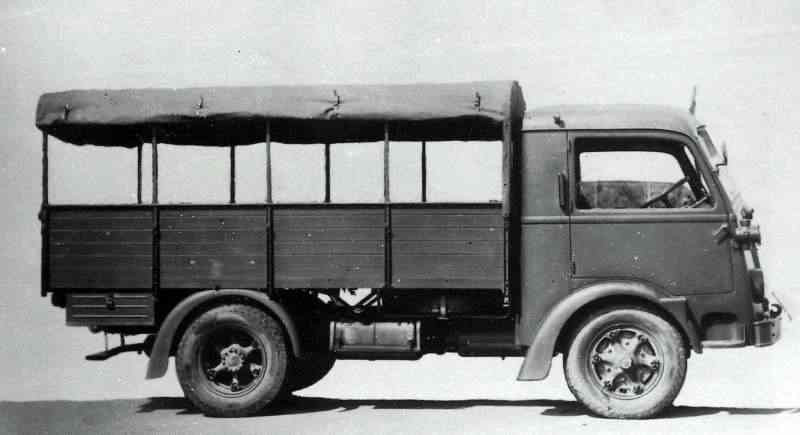
- Type: Medium truck
- Place of origin: Italy

Service history
- In service: 1939-1945
- Used by: Italy; France (700) (Nazi Germany) Germany (3,300); Bulgaria(100)
- Wars: World War II

Production history
- Designed: 1938
- Manufacturer: FIAT
- Produced: 1939-1948
- No. built: 10,000
- Variants: FIAT 626 N FIAT 626 NL; FIAT 626 NLM

Specifications
- Mass: approximately 3 tonne (6,000 lb)
- Length: 6.21 m
- Width: 2.18 m
- Height: 2.675 m
- Crew: 1 driver and 1 or 2 passengers with 21 passengers (maximum)
- Suspension: 4x2 (later models 4x4)
- Operational range: 340 km (210 miles)
- Maximum speed: 65 km/h (40 mph)

The Fiat 626 was an Italian medium truck manufactured by FIAT that met specifications for the Italian Army and Italian Air Force for military operations prior to World War II. The Fiat 626 NLM operated in Italian North Africa (1940–1943), Italian East Africa (1940–1941), the Balkans (1940–1944), France (1940–1944), and the Soviet Union (1941-1943/44).

In 1939, the 626 was the first FIAT truck with forward control and replaced the models 621 and 633.

The initial version of the 626 for civilian use was the 626N ("N" for Nafta, the Italian for diesel). This was followed by a slightly longer wheelbase version the 626NL (from Nafta Lungo - "diesel long"). The military version for the Italian Army and Italian Air Force was the 626NLM (for Nafta Lungo Militare), having a differential lock and a wooden body with fixed side walls.

A reliable workhorse, the FIAT 626 became the standard Italian medium truck and operated on all fronts.

France ordered 1,650 trucks; 700 had been delivered by the time Italy declared war on June 10, 1940. After the Italian armistice with the Allies in September 1943, the FIAT 626 was used by German forces. By 31 January 1945, 3,000 had been produced for German use. In 1941, 100 trucks were purchased by the Bulgarian army after Bulgaria became an ally of Germany and Italy. The Bulgarian Army still used the vehicles in 1944–1945, after the country signed an armistice with the Allies and participated in the war against Germany.

Production ceased in 1948, after 10,000 Fiat 626 had been produced at FIAT's Turin assembly lines.
