= Dud =

Ammunition or explosive that fails to fire or detonate

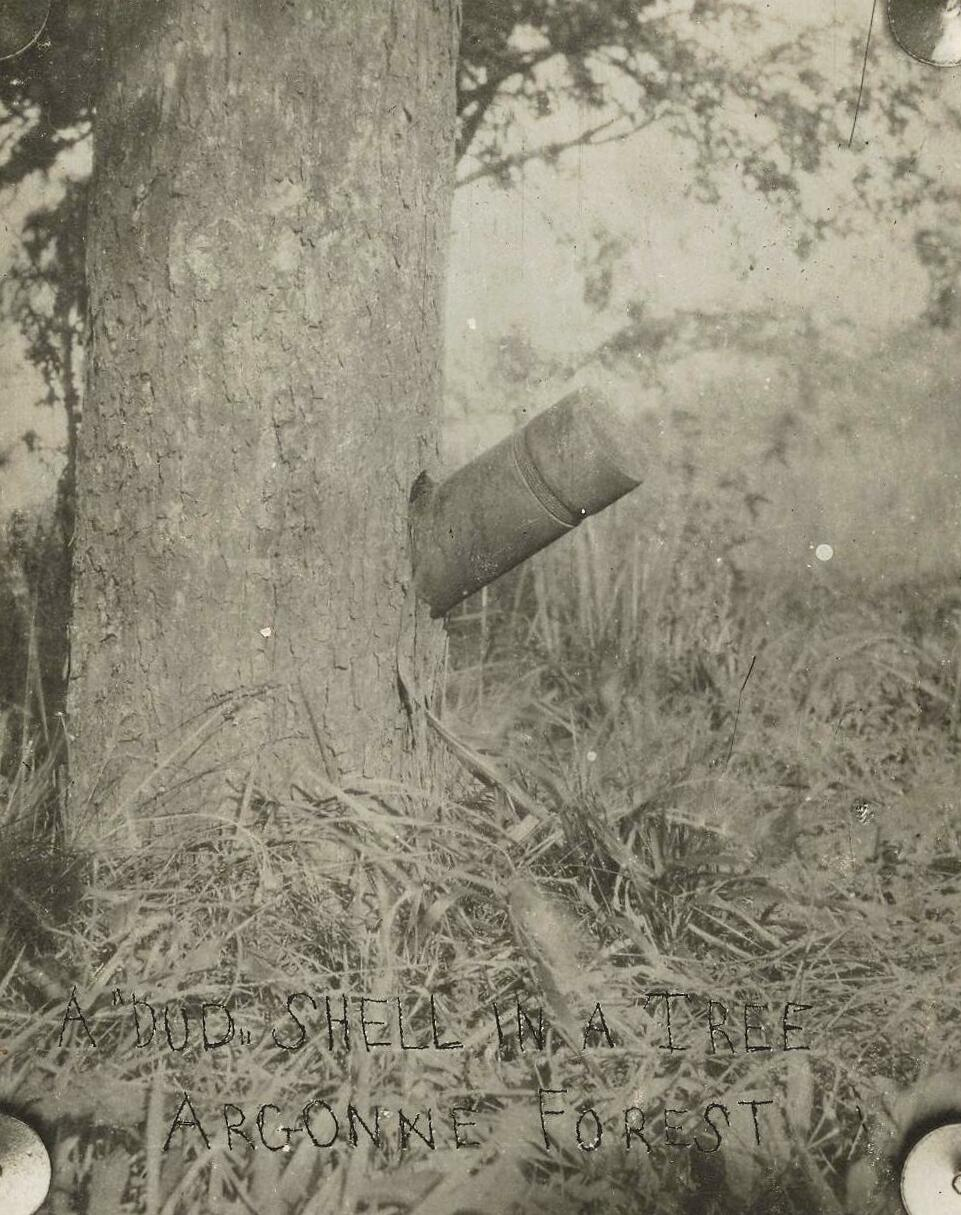
Dud shell lodged in a tree, Argonne Forest, First World War

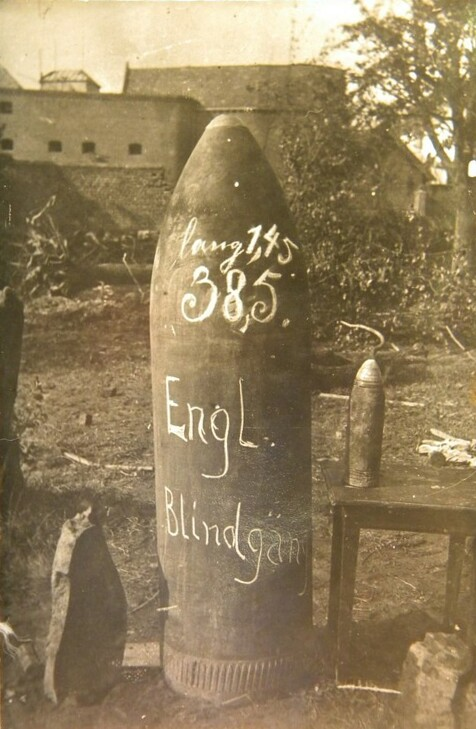
British dud during World War I

A dud is in general something that fails to function in the way it is intended to. In a military context the word is often used to refer to an ammunition round or explosive that fails to fire or detonate as expected. Devices designed or built poorly—for example, improvised explosive devices (IEDs) and bombs with over-complicated fuses—have higher chances of being duds. They must be deactivated and disposed of carefully. In war-torn areas, many curious children have been injured or killed from tampering with such devices.

The variation absolute dud describes a nuclear weapon that fails to explode. (A nuclear weapon which does explode, but does not achieve its expected power, is termed a fizzle.)

== Etymology ==
The term descends from the Middle English dudde, originally meaning worn-out or ragged clothing, and is a cognate of duds (i.e., "clothing") and dowdy. Eventually dud became a general pejorative for something useless, including ammunition. The word's use is attested from 1355.

== See also ==
- Bomb disposal
- Firearm malfunction
- Unexploded ordnance
