= OTO Mod. 35 =

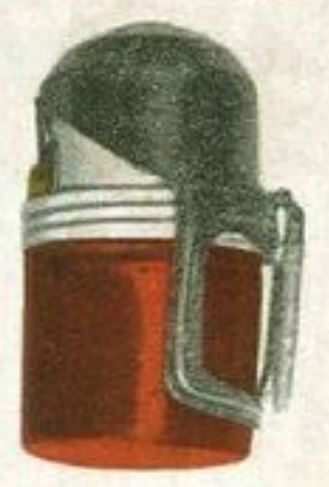
- Type: Offensive type grenade
- Place of origin: Kingdom of Italy

Service history
- In service: 1935–1945
- Wars: Spanish Civil War; World War II

Production history
- Manufacturer: OTO Melara

Specifications
- Mass: 150 g (5.3 oz)
- Height: 75 mm (3.0 in)
- Diameter: 50 mm (2.0 in)
- Filling: TNT
- Filling weight: 36 g (1.3 oz)
- Detonation mechanism: Percussion on impact

The OTO Mod. 35 was a hand grenade issued to the Regio Esercito during World War II.

== Description ==
Entered into service in 1935, the OTO Mod. 35, together with the SRCM Mod. 35 and the Breda Mod. 35 represented the new generation of hand grenades with which the Regio Esercito faced the Second World War.

== Design ==
The OTO Mod. 35 is an offense type hand grenade consisting of an aluminium body bomb painted red, contains 36 g of TNT that at the time of the explosion fragment a ball of lead containing lead pellets.

The O.T.O. is the simplest of the three Mod.35 Types. The Allways fuze is driven by a lead ball held between a cone shaped cap and a spring loaded striker.

An interesting feature is the design on the ball, it's a lead-wrapped assembly of small lead shot, intended to rupture at the moment of detonation, a safety feature.

Since the grenade was an offensive type, designers didn't want to have a heavy part of the bomb flying far away from the intended point of detonation and possibly injuring the thrower. That's the reason why the ball should break into tiny parts at the moment of detonation.

The internal capsule contains the explosive and a primer/detonator tube. A thin wire ring locks the two body halves together at a specific place, fixing the overall length, so as not to bind the internal parts.

=== Operational use ===
To use, the pull tab with the attached safety strip is withdrawn, just prior to throwing, unlocking the safety lever.

When thrown the lever was to catch the air and be pulled from the grenade, removing the safety bar from between the firing pin and the primer. This was an open terrain grenade, as some amount of time and distance was required to allow the mechanism to function properly, which it had a tendency not to do.

Alongside its SRCM and Breda counterparts, the OTO Mod. 35 was commonly known as the 'Red Devil' by Allied troops in the North African campaign for being painted bright red and their tendency to sometimes fail to detonate upon hitting the ground; Allied soldiers reported that disturbing dud grenades could activate the fuse, which led to the 'Devil' part of the nickname.

== Users ==
- Kingdom of Italy
  - Regio Esercito

== See also ==
- SRCM Mod 35
- Breda Mod 35

== Bibliography ==
- Le armi e le artiglierie in servizio di F. Grandi, 1938.
- Enciclopedia delle armi, Melita Editori, La Spezia 1995.
- Dizionario delle armi di Letterio Musciarelli, Milano 1978.
- Armi della fanteria italiana nella seconda guerra mondiale di Nicola Pignato, 1978.
