= Fougasse =

Fougasse may refer to:

- Fougasse (cartoonist) (1887–1965), pen name of Cyril Kenneth Bird, cartoonist and editor of Punch 1949–53
- Fougasse (weapon)
  - Flame fougasse
- Fougasse (bread)

See also Focaccia.
