= Type 74 flamethrower =

Type 74
- Type: Flamethrower
- Place of origin: China

Service history
- In service: 1970s - present
- Wars: Sino-Vietnamese War; Sino-Vietnamese conflicts (1979–1991)

Production history
- Designer: Norinco
- Designed: 1970s
- Manufacturer: Norinco
- Produced: 1974 - present

The Type 74 (Chinese: 74式火焰噴射器) is a Chinese flamethrower.

== Design ==
The Type 74 is the Chinese copy of the Soviet LPO-50 flamethrower.

Despite looking superficially similar to the LPO-50, there are major differences for the Type 74. The main difference being the fact that the Type 74 only possess two fuel canisters to the LPO-50's three, with the canister's volume being slightly increased to compensate for the loss of the third.

The reduction of canisters lead to a reduced weight from 23 to 20 kg, but it also lead to a reduction from 3 to 2 uses before having to reload.

Nevertheless, China claims that the Type 74 has technical improvements that offset the ammunition supply, with the main reason being its effectiveness against bunkers said to be doubled. Or, in other words, the Type 74 has a stronger ignition cartridge allowing for more fuel to be expelled in less time.

This results in significant recoil, requiring the Type 74 to be used in the prone position. As the Type 74 now has two canisters, consequently, the number of ignition charges is also reduced to two.

== Users ==
- China
