= Abwehrflammenwerfer 42 =

German static defensive flamethrower used in World War Ii

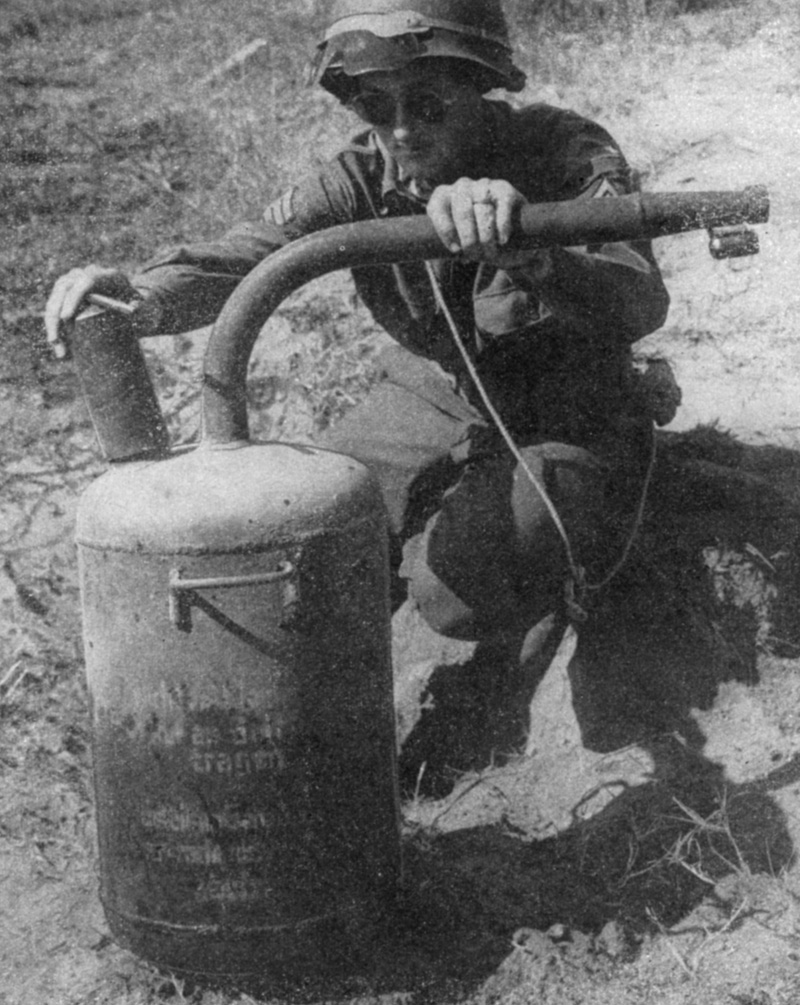
A US soldier holds up a German static flamethrower, probably an Abwehrflammenwerfer 42.

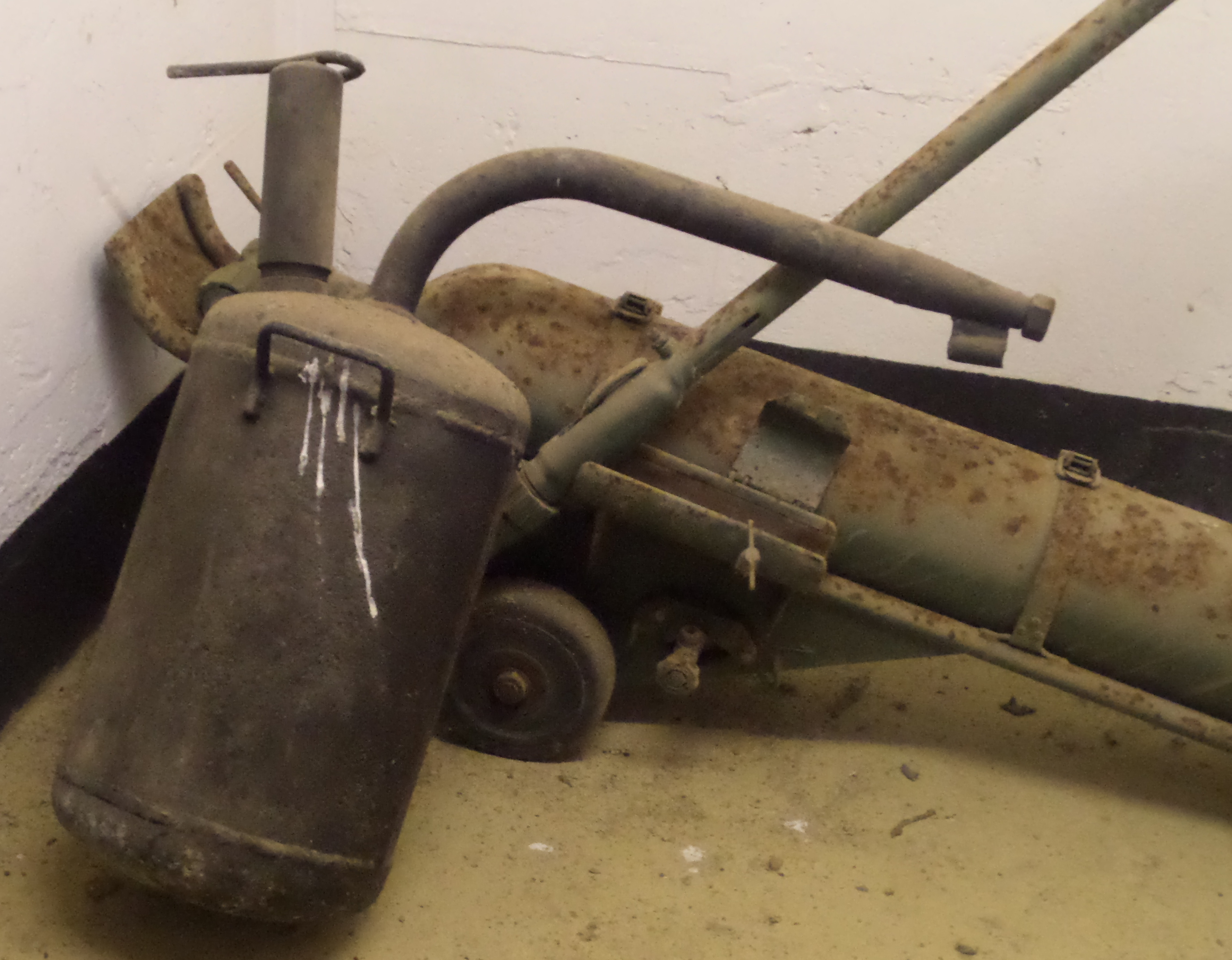
An Abwehrflammenwerfer 42 displayed at Elizabeth Castle, Jersey, 2017

The Abwehrflammenwerfer 42 was a German static defensive flamethrower, flame fougasse or flame mine used during the Second World War. The design was copied from Russian FOG-1 mines that were encountered in 1941 during Operation Barbarossa. These were usually buried at intervals of 11 to 27 metres (12 to 30 yd) covering road blocks, landing beaches, harbour walls and other obstacles. They were normally mixed in with other mines or emplaced behind barbed wire and could be command detonated or triggered by tripwires or other devices.

The mine consisted of a large fuel cylinder 53 centimetres (21 in) high and 30 centimetres (12 in) with a capacity of 29.5 litres (6.5 imp gal; 7.8 US gal) containing a black viscid liquid; a mix of light, medium, and heavy oils. A second, smaller cylinder, 67 millimetres (2.6 in) in diameter and 25 centimetres (9.8 in) high, was mounted on top of the fuel cylinder; it contained the propellant powder, which was normally either black powder or a mixture of nitrocellulose and diethylene glycol dinitrate. A flame tube was fixed centrally on top of the fuel cylinder, it was a 50 millimetres (2.0 in) diameter pipe that rose from the centre of the fuel cylinder and curved to extend horizontally approximately 50 centimetres (20 in). When the mine was buried, only the flame tube was normally above ground.

When the mine was triggered, a squib charge ignited the propellant, creating a burst of hot gas which forced the fuel from the main cylinder and out of the flame tube. A second squib ignited the fuel as it passed out of the end of the tube. The projected stream of burning fuel was 4.5 metres (15 ft) wide and 2.7 metres (8 ft 10 in) high with a range of about 27 metres (89 ft), and lasted about 1.5 seconds.

== See also ==
- Flame fougasse
- List of flamethrowers
