= Meng Huo You =

Petroleum in ancient China

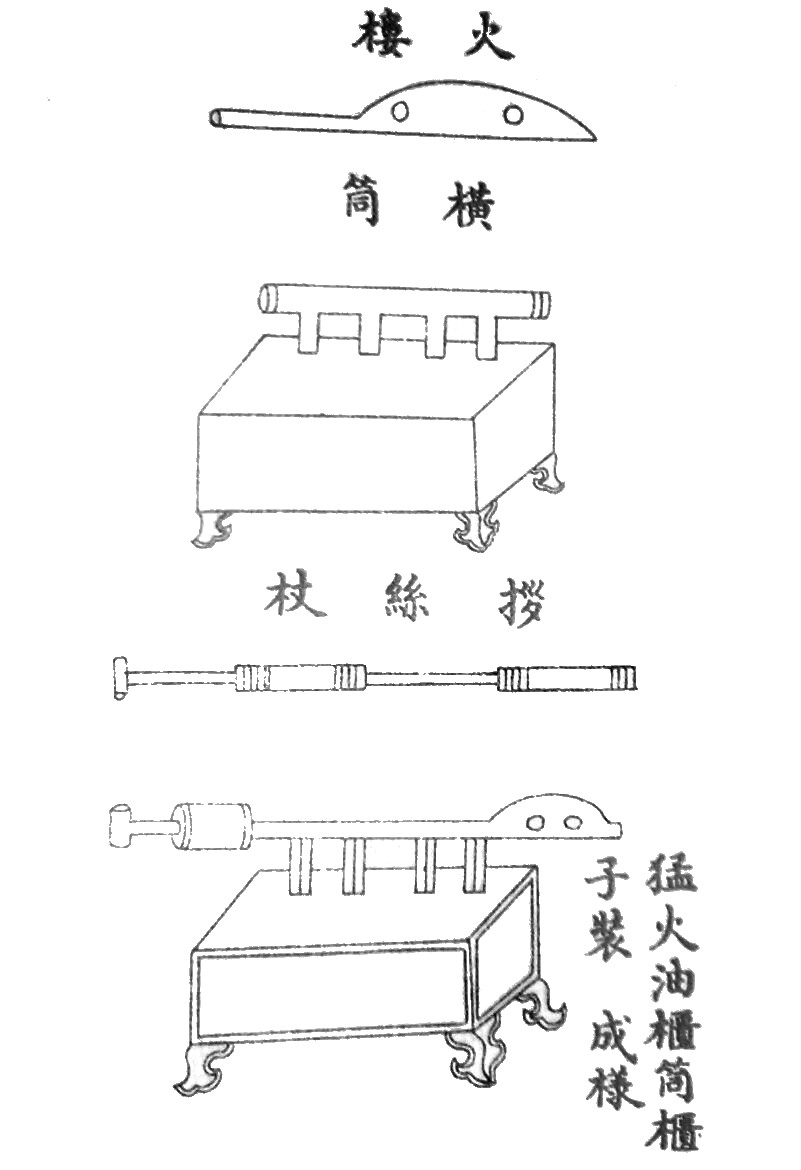
A Chinese flamethrower from the Wujing Zongyao manuscript of 1044 AD, Song dynasty

Meng Huo You (Chinese: 猛火油; pinyin: měng huǒ yóu; lit. 'fierce-fire oil') is the name given to petroleum in ancient China, which practiced the use of petroleum as an incendiary weapon in warfare.

== Historical records of petroleum ==
During the Eastern Han dynasty, the Chinese historian and poet Ban Gu recorded in the geography section of his Book of Han that a flammable liquid substance are found in the Gao Nu County, located in the northeast portion of present-day Shaanxi Province. This "flammable liquid" was likely petroleum that had seeped through the ground and was floating above the local waters. Four hundred years later, during the late stages of Southern and Northern dynasties, historian Fan Ye cited in the Book of Later Han that the collection and exploitation of petroleum had been around for some time:

（延壽）縣南有山，石出泉水，大如，燃之極明，不可食。縣人謂之石漆。
In the southern mountains of Yan Shou county, there exists [a] water which springs from the rock and combusts brightly; the liquid is not for consumption. Local residents refer to it as "stone-lacquer".

This "stone-lacquer" is likely petroleum. There are similar records from the Jin and Northern Wei dynasties as well.

The earliest mention of "rock oil" (石油), the Chinese name for petroleum, is by a book "Grand Peace Records" from the Northern Song dynasty, and officially designated the current name by Song dynasty polymath scientist Shen Kuo using the description found in his famous book Dream Pool Essays.

Due to the chemical characteristics of petroleum that it continues to burn in water, it was widely used by feudal militaries. Some examples include the defense of the city of Jiuquan in Gansu Province in the year 578 against the invading Göktürk army, in which the defenders used petroleum to ignite and destroy the siege engines brought in by the invaders.

== Practice and proliferation of Meng Huo You ==
In ancient China, the use of petroleum in warfare was the most effective during the Five Dynasties and Ten Kingdoms period and the following four major dynasties and powers from Song through to Yuan, including the Jin and Liao dynasties. During this time a small dynasty in Vietnam paid tribute to the Chinese emperor with petroleum. Before this time, fire attacks were limited to burning wood or animal fat; using petroleum greatly increased the potency of fire attacks, and the fact that trying to douse the burning petroleum with water will only spread the fire more rapidly made burning oil an ideal weapon for destroying cities filled with wooden structures.

Meng Huo You is in many ways similar to the use of Greek fire. The devices used for the Chinese weapons had propelling systems as well. One of the key differences between the two weapons is the use of gunpowder as the ignition in the Chinese design.

== Decline ==
The Chinese continued to use the oil as a way of repelling nomadic invaders from the northwest. However, by the Ming and Qing dynasties, the newly mature technology of gunpowder had for the most part replaced the use of these short-range flamethrowers, which saw little mention in the historical records of the last dynasties of imperial China.
