= Converted Flamethrower 40 =

Riot control weapon

Umgebauter Flammenwerfer 40 (Converted Flamethrower 40) is a backpack flamethrower converted to shoot a powerful jet of water solution of CN gas as a riot control device. The device was first used by the Swiss police in 1970. They are found today to be mounted on a variety of trucks and are used to help disperse protesters without the use of potentially harmful or deadly force.

Some Converted Flamethrower 40s were loaned to the German police for use at the protests against building the Runway West (Startbahn-West) at Frankfurt-am-Main in West Germany in 1979. The Cold War era Bundesgrenzschutz may also have had some examples in their inventory. Some police forces still regularly use them, for example in Aargau in Switzerland.
