= Caterpillar Twenty-Two =

Tractor produced from 1934 to 1939

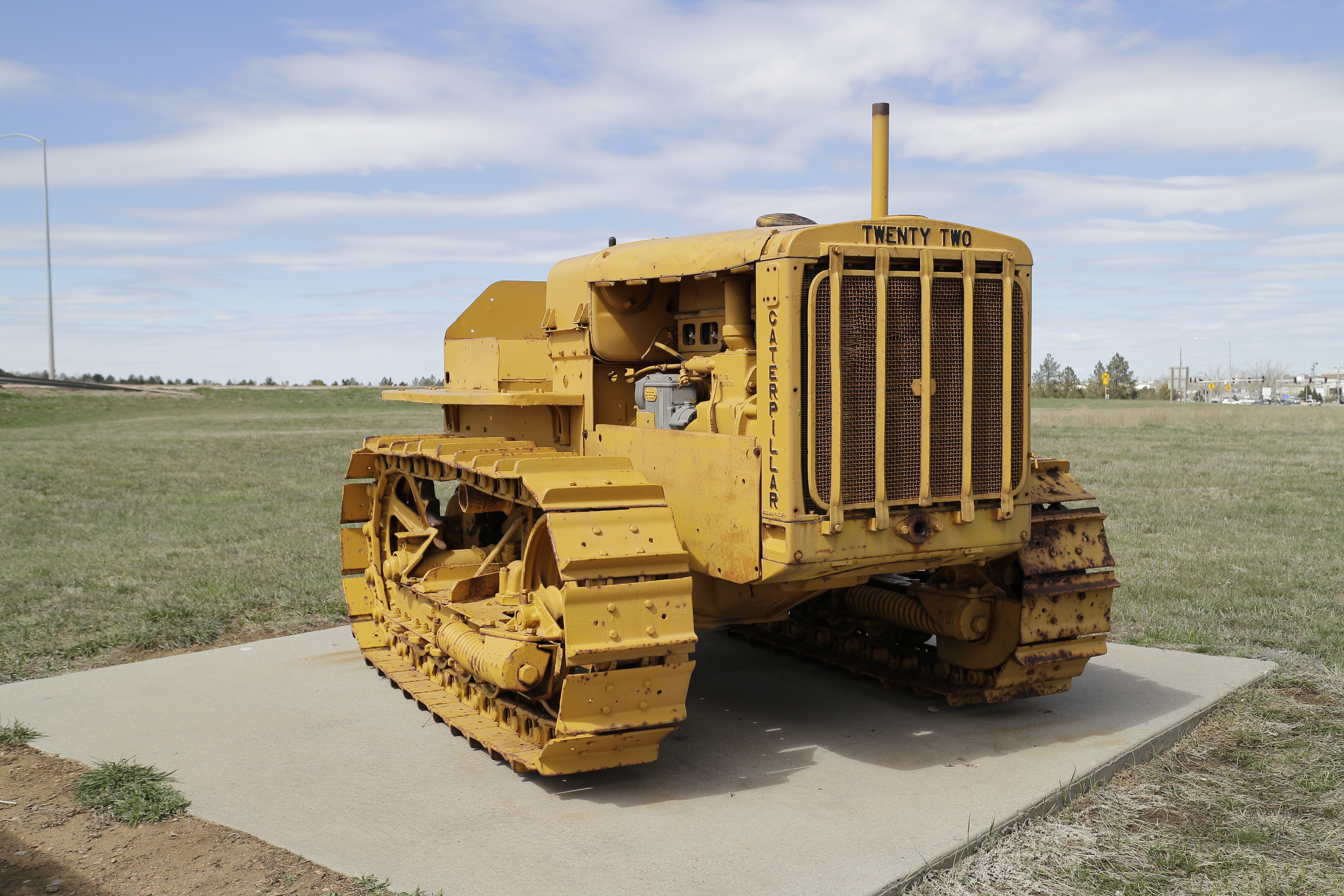
- Type: agricultural
- Manufacturer: Caterpillar
- Production: 1934-1939
- Length: 108 in.
- Width: 57.75 in. (40" gauge); 67.75 in. (50" gauge)
- Height: 56.125 in.
- Weight: 6,200 lbs. (40" gauge); 6,270 lbs. (50" gauge)
- Propulsion: tracks

The Caterpillar Twenty-Two is a tractor that was first manufactured by Caterpillar in 1934 to replace the Caterpillar Twenty. It had a fuel capacity of 22 US gallons (83 L; 18 imp gal), and came in two model series, 2F and 1J.
