= List of flamethrowers =

This page is a list of flamethrowers of all forms from all around the world.

== Human portable ==
Name/ designation	Year of introduction	Country of origin	Notes
Argeș	1930s	Romania	Argeș was a portable Romanian flamethrower designed at the end of the 1930s by the Army's study and experiment laboratory, located in the building of the Obor mask factory. It was adopted by the Romanian Land Forces on June 30, 1943, in order to supplement the Italian Pignone flamethrower of 1937 and the German models of 1935 and 1939. As incendiary mixture, it could use gasoline, petroleum or the special liquid H-E, a compound of gasoline and oil that appeared after the distillation of tar.
DGFM flamethrower	1916	Argentina	The DGFM flamethrower was a flamethrower of Argentine origin manufactured in 1916.
Einstossflammenwerfer 46	1944	Germany	The Einstossflammenwerfer 46 was a light single-shot flamethrower, used as an auxiliary infantry weapon during late World War II. It was a handheld device, composed of a cylindrical tank with a pistol grip and a nozzle at the end. It weighed only 3.6 kg (7.9 lb), it contained 1.7 L (0.37 imp gal; 0.45 US gal) of fuel and had a range of 27 m (89 ft).
Flamethrower, Portable, No 2	1943	United Kingdom	The Flamethrower, Portable, No 2 (nicknamed "Lifebuoy" from the shape of its fuel tank), also known as the "Ack Pack", was a British design of backpack flamethrower for infantry use in the Second World War. It was a near copy of the German Wechselapparat ("Wex") from 1917. It contained 18 L (4.0 imp gal) of fuel in a doughnut-shaped container.
Flammenwerfer M.16.	1916	Germany	The Flammenwerfer M.16. was a flamethrower used by German infantry during World War I for clearing trenches and killing riflemen. It was used in 1918 in the Battle of Argonne Forest in France. The Germans in the 1940s created a further development, the Flammenwerfer 35. German riflemen would often be positioned behind flamethrower-carrying infantry. The flamethrowers would kill large numbers of enemy infantry, enabling the riflemen to attack the remaining troops with a high probability of success.
Flammenwerfer 35	1935	Germany	The FmW 35 was the one man German flamethrower used during World War II used to clear out trenches and buildings. This was a deadly weapon that was extremely effective at close range. It could project fuel up to 25–30 m from the user. This weapon was also known as the "skinsteal", because using this weapon at close range would usually result in severe skin loss. The burning liquid compound used produced fumes very similar to lachrymatory agents. It contained 11.8 L (2.6 imp gal; 3.1 US gal) of fuel in a single vertical cylindrical tank. Its disadvantage was its large weight (36 kg).
Flammenwerfer 41	1941	Germany	The Flammenwerfer 41, or FmW 41, was the German flamethrower used during late World War II, used to clear out trenches and buildings. It was the more upgraded version of the Flammenwerfer 35. It could project fuel up to 32 m from the user. It contained 7.5 L of fuel in a horizontal cylindrical tank and weighed 22 kg.
Handflammpatrone	1965	West Germany	The 'Handflammpatrone' DM34 was a single-shot, disposable incendiary weapon issued to the German Armed Forces from 1965 to 2001. It fired a red phosphorus round that would explode after 8 m (26 ft) on hard contact, or after 1.3 seconds by fuse. The fuel spreads across an area approximately 15 m wide and 50 m long and burns at 1,300 °C. Max range 90 m.
Harvey Flamethrower	1940	United Kingdom	The Harvey flamethrower comprised a welded steel cylinder containing 22 gallons (100 L) of creosote and a standard bottle of compressed nitrogen at 1,800 pounds per square inch (120 bar) mounted on a sack truck. It could produce a jet of fuel lasting about 10 seconds at a range of up to 60 ft (18 m).
Hay flamethrower	1917	United Kingdom	
Home Guard Flamethrower	1940	United Kingdom	The Home Guard Flamethrower stored fuel in a barrel mounted on hand cart that was light enough to be wheeled along roads and possibly over fields to where it was needed. A hand-operated pump would give a flame of up to sixty feet (18 m) in length.
K pattern flamethrower	1944	Poland	The K pattern (Polish: wzór K) was a man portable backpack flamethrower, clandestinely produced in occupied Poland during World War II for the underground Home Army. These flamethrowers were used in the Warsaw Uprising in 1944. It contained 15 L of fuel in a cylindrical tank and weighed 25.6 kg,
Kleinflammenwerfer	1911	Germany	The first German man portable flamethrower, was known as the Kleif (Kleinflammenwerfer). Fuel was stored in a large vertical, cylindrical backpack container. High pressure propellant was stored in another, smaller container attached to the fuel tank. A long hose connected the fuel tank to a lance tube with an igniting device at the nozzle. The propellant forced the fuel through the hose and out of the nozzle at high speed when a valve was opened. The igniting device at the nozzle set fire to the fuel as it sprayed out. The flamethrower was operated by two soldiers, one carrying the fuel and propellant tanks, another wielding the lance. There was also a Grof ('Gro'ss'f'lammenwerfer) also introduced in 1911.
Lanciafiamme Modello 35	1935	Italy	The Lanciafiamme Modello 35 was Italian backpack flamethrower used during World War II. It contained 12 L of fuel in two cylindrical tanks and weighed 27 kg.
Lanciafiamme Mod. 41 d'assalto	1941	Italy	The Lanciafiamme Mod. 41 d'assalto was a flamethrower meant to be an extremely light and compact in order to equip paratroopers and Assault Engineers.
LC-T1-M1	1984	Brazil	The LC-T1-M1 was built by the Brazilian company Hydroar for the Brazilian army in 1984 to serve as a replacement for the WWII era M2 Flamethrower. It consists of two units: the tank group, and the gun group. The tank group works in a similar way to the M2 Flamethrower: the two vertical tanks are filled with fuel, and the single horizontal tank is filled with inert gas at high pressure. A regulator is then used to supply a constant pressure of 250-350psi to the two fuel tanks. The gun group is operated by first pressing the front trigger to engage the igniter, then pushing the rear lever forwards to discharge the fuel.
Liekinheitin M/44	1944	Finland	The Liekinheitin M/44 was designed by Sergeant M. Kuusinen in 1944. He attached the flame tube of a flamethrower to the underbarrel of a Suomi KP/-31, Finland's standard issue submachine gun. This turned the Suomi into a combination weapon that could act as both a submachine gun and a flamethrower so the operator wouldn't have to rely for assistance of other soldiers so much for covering fire.
LPO-50	1950	Soviet Union	Soviet Army flamethrowers had three backpack fuel tanks side by side. Its user could fire three shots, each emptying one of the tanks. The mechanism used to empty the tank was not a pressurized gas cylinder but a black powder cartridge on each fuel cylinder. This type is used in two versions, the "Light Infantry Flamethrower" (Легкий Пехотный Огнемёт) LPO-50 (ЛПО-50), and the "Heavy Infantry Flamethrower" (Тяжёлый Пехотный Огнемёт) TPO-70 (ТПО-70); a heavier, wheeled version was remotely triggered.
M1A1 Flamethrower	1940	United States	The M1 and M1A1 were portable flamethrowers developed by the United States during World War II. M1 weighed 72 lb, had a range of 15 meters, and had a fuel tank capacity of 5 gallons. The improved M1A1 weighed less at 65 lb, had a much longer range of 45 meters, had the same fuel tank capacity, and fired thickened fuel (napalm).
M2 flamethrower	1943	United States	The M2 flamethrower (M2-2) was an American man portable backpack flamethrower that was used in World War II. It was the successor to the M1 and M1A1 flamethrowers.
M9 flamethrower	1960	United States	The M9 flamethrower was an American man portable backpack flamethrower that was used in the Vietnam War. It was lighter and easier to pack than the M1 and M2 series flamethrowers. Despite its light weight, with more advanced formula of napalm that was used during Vietnam War compared to old napalm formula that was used during WWII, it could easily reach the effective range of 60 meters (200 feet), while the effective ranges still remained around 45 meters (148 feet) once pressure is vastly lowered. The later modification M9E1-7 was even smaller compared to the original M9 model, being five meters shorter and had 6–7 seconds rate of fire compared to 9–10 of original M9.
Marsden flamethrower	1941	United Kingdom	The Marsden flamethrower comprised a backpack with four imperial gallons (18 L) of fuel pressurised to 400 pounds per square inch (28 bar) by compressed nitrogen gas, the backpack was connected to a "gun" by means of a flexible tube and the weapon was operated by a simple lever. The weapon could give 12 seconds of flame divided into any number of individual spurts.
Morriss portable flamethrower	1918	United Kingdom	
ROKS flamethrowers	1935	Soviet Union	The ROKS-2 and ROKS-3 were man portable flamethrowers used by the USSR in the Second World War. The ROKS-2 was designed not to attract attention so the fuel tank was square and resembled a regular backpack, and the nozzle looked like a service rifle. The propellant tank was a small bottle underneath the backpack fuel tank. ROKS-3 was a simplified design and had a regular cylindrical fuel tank. The Finnish designation for captured ROKS-2 units was m/41-r.
Schilt Flamethrower	1916	France	The Schilt flamethrower was a French flamethrower made in response to the German flamethrowers on the Western Front. It was used in both World War I and World War II.
Tirrena T-148/B	19??	Italy	The T-148/B flamethrower consists of a shoulder-mounted tank, a connecting tube and a lance. The two cylinders of the tank are filled to two-thirds with a total of 12 liters of flammable gelatine and the remaining space with nitrogen compressed to 28 kg/cm². When not in use, the gas is vented from a screw on the side of the filling valve. Electricity for the sparks that ignite the jet of liquid is provided by a 9.6 V rechargeable electric accumulator, weighing 0.625 kg. The operating temperature ranges from -20 °C to +60 °.
Type 93 and 100 flamethrowers	1933	Japan	The Type 93 and Type 100 Flamethrowers (九三式/一〇〇式火炎放射器, Kyūsan-shiki/Hyaku-shiki kaenhōshaki?) were flamethrowers used by the Imperial Japanese Army and Imperial Japanese Navy's SNLF during the Second Sino-Japanese War and World War II.
Wechselapparat	1916	Germany	The Germans introduced another small flamethrower design in 1916 to replace the earlier Kleif. The Wechselapparat ("Wex") had a doughnut-shaped backpack fuel container with a spherical propellant container in the middle. This design was updated during the Second World War to become flamethrower model 40. However, model 40 was considered too fragile, so it was soon replaced by model 41, a simpler construction with smaller, horizontal, cylindrical backpack containers. The doughnut-shaped container design was copied by the British during World War II.

== Vehicle mounted ==
Name/ designation	Year of intro	Country of origin	Notes
Blaster Flamethrower	1998	South Africa	The Blaster (also known as the "BMW Flamethrower" hence the production video) was a 1998 invention by South African inventor Charl Fourie to provide a defence against carjackings. The invention came at a time when crime rates were rising and armed assault and carjackings became a serious public concern in South Africa. The Blaster was a liquefied petroleum gas flamethrower installed along the sides of the vehicle under the doors. Should a carjacker approach, the driver could raise his hands, faking surrender, then activate a pedal or switch and violent flames would erupt from the sides of the vehicle, "neutralizing" the assailant. The inventor claims it is unlikely to kill but would "definitely blind" the assailant.
Churchill Crocodile	1943	United Kingdom	The Churchill Crocodile was a British flame-throwing tank developed during the Second World War. It was a variant of the Tank, Infantry, Mk VI (A22) Churchill Mark VII, although the Churchill Mark IV was initially chosen to be the base vehicle. The Crocodile was introduced as one of the specialised armoured vehicles developed under Major-General Percy Hobart, informally known as "Hobart's Funnies". Production started in October 1943, in time for the Normandy invasion of 1944.
Cockatrice flamethrower	1940	United Kingdom	The Cockatrice was mounted on a wheeled, armoured vehicle. This had a rotating weapon mount with elevation to 90 degrees and it had a range of about 100 yd (91 m), stored about two tons of fuel and used compressed carbon monoxide as a propellant.
KV-8	1939	Soviet Union	A KV-1 fitted with the ATO-41 flame-thrower in the turret, beside a machine gun. In order to accommodate the new weapon, the 76.2mm gun was replaced with a smaller 45 mm Gun M1932, though it was disguised to look like the standard 76 mm (The cannon was placed inside a 76 mm tube). Some KV-8S were created by mating the KV-1S hull with a KV-8 turret, while the remainder had a KV-1S turret with ATO-42 flamethrower but lacked the coaxial machine gun.
KV-8S	1942	Soviet Union	A KV-1S fitted with the ATO-42 flame-thrower (improved version of ATO-41) in the turret. In order to accommodate the new weapon, the 76.2mm gun was replaced with a smaller 45 mm Gun M1932, though it was disguised to look like the standard 76 mm (The cannon was placed inside a 76 mm tube)
KV-8M	1942	Soviet Union	A KV-8S fitted with two ATO-42 flame-thrower (improved version of ATO-41), one in the hull (replacing the machine gun), the other in the turret. In order to accommodate the new weapon in the turret, the 76.2mm gun was replaced with a smaller 45 mm Gun M1932, though it was disguised to look like the standard 76 mm (The cannon was placed inside a 76 mm tube)
LVT-4 with Mark I flamethrower	1944	United States	The U.S. Navy mounted three Navy Mark I flamethrowers in LVTs for the Marines at Peleliu. Before the battle was over three additional LVTs were adapted.
M3A1 Satan	1944	United States	The M3A1 Satan was produced by the U.S. Army's Chemical Warfare Service at Schofield Barracks in the Territory of Hawaii. The first M3A1 Satan was made by the 43rd Chemical Laboratory Company under Colonel Unmacht (USA) and had a Canadian Ronson to replace the main armament. Upon completion of that tank Colonel Unmacht requested inter service assistance from the Seabees and Marines. The War Department classified that effort as top secret. Twenty three of these tanks were produced for or the 1st and 4th Marine Divisions on Saipan and Tinian.
M4 Sherman E4-5 (auxiliary bow gun)	1944	United States	In the zone of the interior the U.S. Army had installed E4-5 flamethrowers in place of the 50 cal. bow machine gun. Six of these tanks were given to the 3rd Marine Division for the assault on Guam. Those tanks would also see action on Iwo Jima. They had a range of 49-60 yds and a 170 gal. napalm reservoir.
M4 Sherman POA-CWS-H1 Ronson variant	1944	United States	Colonel Unmacht's Seabees worked with the men of the Army's 713th tank Battalion to convert all 54 of their tanks to flamethrowers. These tanks had Ronson flamethrowers installed in them with a range of 100 yds and the same fuel reservoir as the CB-H1. The 713th supported both the Army and Marine Corps on Okinawa.
M4 Sherman POA-CWS-H1-2	1944	United States	Colonel Unmacht's command next effort was mounted on a M4-3A tank. It was a hybrid combining the best elements of the Ronson, Navy model 1 and the Navy Mark I flamethrowers. The first tanks were designated for the CB-H1 flamethrower. However, the Seabees quickly made a change that greatly improved their design with the CB-H2. That flamethrower had a range of 150 yards, the turret could rotate 270°, and a 300 gal. napalm reservoir. Eight of these tanks were produced for the Marines on Iwo Jima. USMC designation was M4A3R3.
M4 Sherman POA-CWS-H5 (105 howitzer with coaxial H1A-H5A flamethrower)	1945	United States	The Flame Tank Group Seabees then produced tanks that retained their main armament. In mid 1945 the Seabees started producing the second generation of these tanks. These H1a-H5a Shermans, with either 75mm or 105mm main armaments, were jointly referred to as CWS-POA-H5s. The first ten had 105 howitzers and were en route to 10th Army on Okinawa when the island was secured. The ship diverted to Guam where the 3rd Marine Division was recovering from Iwo Jima. They were given the upgraded units in preparation for the assault on Japan. When the war ended the Marine Corps kept their H5s. They would be at Inchon in 1950.
M67 flame thrower tank	1955	United States	The M67 "Zippo" was a United States built flamethrowing tank, a variant of the M48 Patton series of medium battle tanks. Served with the US Army and Marine Corps, 109 of these units were built, and served in the Vietnam War.
M132 armored personnel carrier flamethrower	1962	United States	The M132 was a United States built flamethrower armed variant of the M113 and M113A1 armored personnel carriers developed in the early 1960s. Approximately 350 were accepted into service. The first prototype of the vehicle was produced in August 1962 when a flamethrower was mounted on a M113. This prototype was only used in combat situations four times that year.
Morriss ship flamethrower	1918	United Kingdom	For the 1918 raid on the port of Zeebrugge the Royal Navy equipped HMS Vindictive with several hand held 'Hay flame guns' and two fixed Morriss flamethrowers for use ashore. They were operated by 34–40 men from the Admiralty Experimental Station at Stratford and included at least one Royal Engineer. They trained at Wembley. The fixed flamethrowers were damaged by shellfire during the approach and only succeeded in pumping unignited fuel over the deck but the hand held units with Hay and Morriss portable flamethrowers were reportedly effective.
OT-34/OT-34-85		Soviet Union	Flamethrower versions of T-34-76/T-34-85
OT-54/OT-55		Soviet Union	Flamethrower versions of T-54/T-55
Ronson flamethrower	1940	United Kingdom	The Ronson system was a flamethrower developed by the British in World War II. It was used on Universal Carriers by the United States Marine Corps and by the Canadians during World War II.
Wasp flamethrower	1942	CanadaUnited Kingdom	The Wasp was based on a small tracked open topped vehicle known as the Universal Carrier. Initially mounting a Ronson flamethrower, the weapon was steadily improved so that a range of 80 to 100 yards (73 to 91 m) was achieved.

== Static ==
Name/ designation	Year of intro	Country of origin	Notes
Abwehrflammenwerfer 42	1942	Germany	The 'Abwehrflammenwerfer 42 was a German static defensive flamethrower, flame fougasse or flame mine used during the Second World War. The design was copied from Russian FOG-1 mines that were encountered in 1941 during Operation Barbarossa. These were usually buried at intervals of 12 to 30 yards (11 to 27 metres) covering road blocks, landing beaches, harbor walls and other obstacles. They were normally mixed in with other mines or emplaced behind barbed wire and could be command detonated or triggered by tripwires or other devices.
Grossflammenwerfer	1911	Germany	In addition to man portable units, the Germans designed heavy flamethrowers before and during the First World War. The large flamethrower (Grossflammenwerfer or "Grof") was designed to be used from the trenches. The fuel and propellant containers were too large and heavy for mobility, but the hose could be long enough to be carried out of the trenches closer to the enemy. Multiple propellant and fuel containers could be connected together to improve range and usage time.
Livens Large Gallery Flame Projector	1916	United Kingdom	Livens Large Gallery Flame Projectors were large experimental flamethrowers used by the British Army in World War I.

== See also ==
- List of pistols
- List of revolvers
- List of assault rifles
- List of sniper rifles
- List of machine guns
- List of firearms
- List of weapons
