= Einstossflammenwerfer 46 =

German flamethrower

- Type: Flamethrower
- Place of origin: Germany

Service history
- In service: 1944–1945
- Used by: Volkssturm; Werwolf; Fallschirmjäger
- Wars: World War II

Production history
- Designed: 1944
- No. built: ~30,700

Specifications
- Mass: 3.6 kg
- Effective firing range: 27 meters (89 ft)

The Einstossflammenwerfer 46 was a handheld single shot flamethrower designed in Germany during the second half of World War II and introduced in 1944; it was engineered to be both cheap and easily mass-produced, falling into the category of throwaway flamethrower. The disposable weapon fired a half-second burst of flame of up to 27 metres (89 ft). It was issued to the Volkssturm and the Werwolf movement, but also used by the Fallschirmjäger (German paratroopers). It was inspired by the Italian "Lanciafiamme Mod. 41 d'assalto".

The weapon was developed during the second half of World War II and used as a substitute to the much more effective but expensive Flammenwerfer 35. The weapon was relatively cheap, armed with a simple container full of gas that would then be shot out of the tube, which allowed the user to shoot a burst of flame, with temperatures exceeding over 1500 degrees Celsius (2700 Fahrenheit) and shooting as far as 27 meters for a split-second, after which the weapon would be discarded. Due to its simplicity and low requirement of training, the weapon was commonly used by the Volkssturm militia along with several German paratrooper units due to its portability. Little information is known about the weapon, but many speculate that at least 30,700 were manufactured.

Shortly after the war in Europe had ended, the United States attempted to make copies of the Einstossflammenwerfer 46 which resulted in the E15 and E16 flamethrowers. In 1955, the E15 and E16 flamethrowers were developed into the M8 flamethrower, which was adopted by American airborne troops and had a technical manual written for them in March 1959.

== See also ==
- Flammenwerfer 35
- Flammenwerfer M.16.
- Handflammpatrone
- Tezutsu-hanabi
