= OP-2 (thickener) =

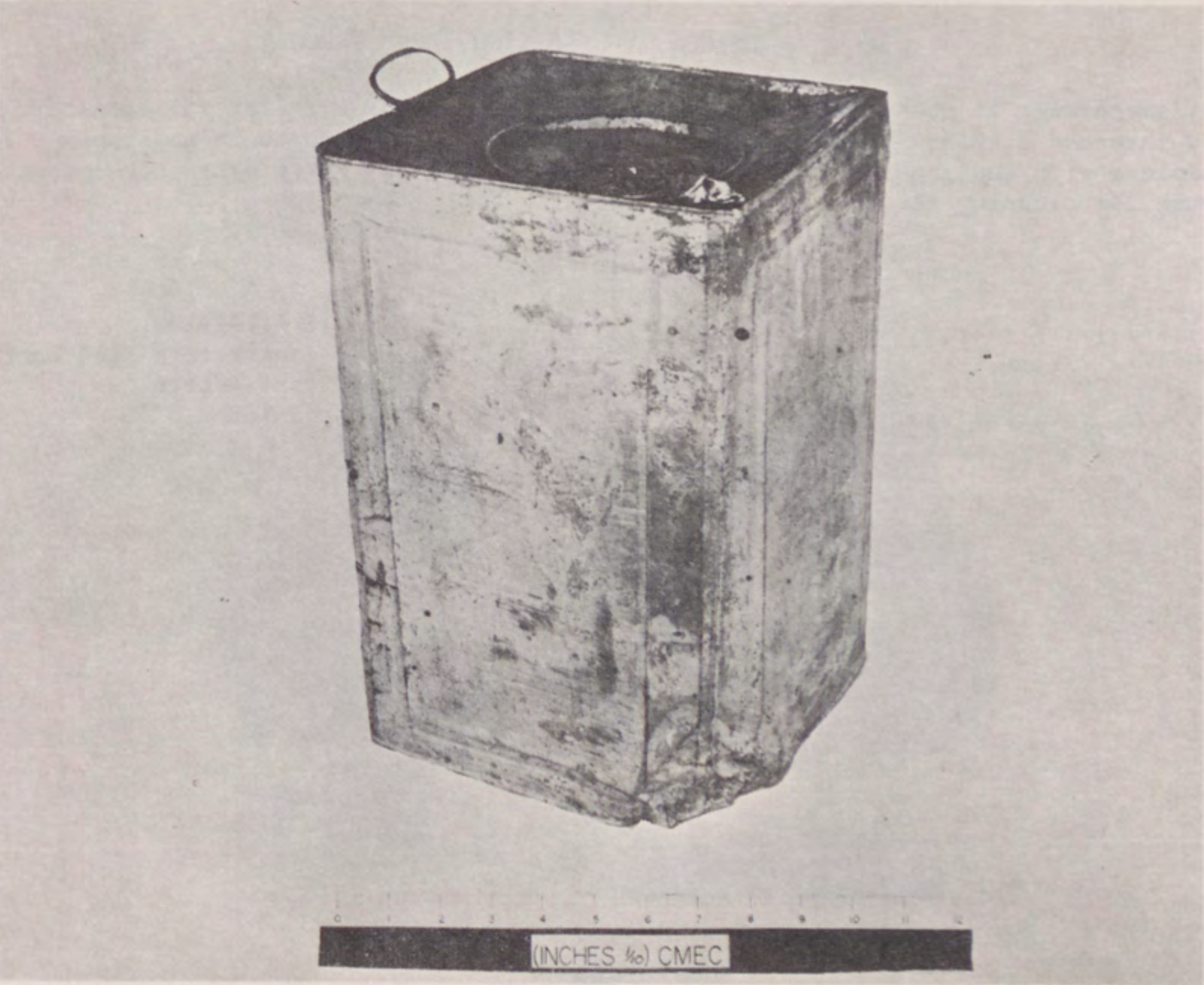
- A Vietnam war era OP-2 can
- Type: Flamethrower fuel gelling agent
- Place of origin: Soviet Union

Service history
- In service: From 1941 (Partially superseded by the NK, in 1951)
- Used by: Soviet army
- Wars: World War II

Production history
- Manufacturer: Narkompisheprom
- Produced: Pilot production began in 1938-1939; Mass production started in 1941.

OP-2 (ОП-2), or Ionov's salt, is a chemical substance used as a standard gasoline thickener by the Soviet Union and Russia. The main component of OP-2 gel is gasoline. It's the Soviet equivalent of napalm, developed at the beginning of World War II.

== Effect ==
Contact with the lit material causes deep burns, due to the hindering effect of the thickener on the fuel and due to the greater thermal conduction given by the salt. It is an incendiary agent with anti-personnel and limited anti-material effect. It is used as a defoliant to deprive enemy personnel of cover and camouflage.

== Use ==
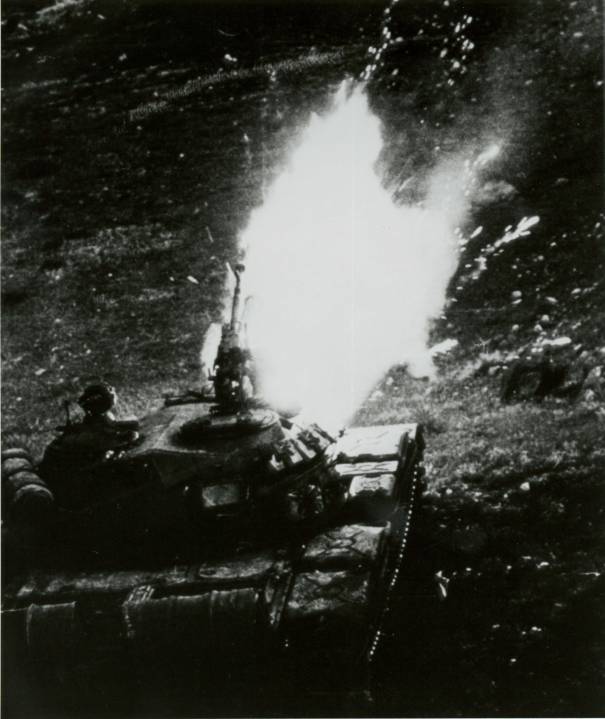
Shot of petrol gelled with OP-2.

The use of the OP-2 is identical to that of napalm, being used extensively by any projector of incendiary material. The employment concentration is identical to that of napalm.

Precursor used to obtain incendiary weapons, it is the standard flame fuel thickener of the soviet union. It was first employed by the soviet union during the early part of world war II to prepare flamethrower fuel (ROKS-3 and LPO-50), molotov cocktail, general incendiary weaponry. It continues to be employed by the Russian army. For example, it is used to prepare the AP-10, which fills the ZB-500 incendiary shell. The OP-2 was supplied to states aligned with the soviet union.

== Composition ==
OP-2 is an aluminum salt of petroleum acid derivatives. The OP-2 and gasoline solution behaves like an unconventional fluid. Its non-stoichiometric formula is (RCOO)_{1.5}Al(OH)_{1.5} (OP-2A), (RCOO)_{1.7}Al(OH)_{1.3} (OP-2). OP-2 has approximately the same thickening capabilities as napalm, but much more compatible with other fuels, such as isooctane, and stable to aerial oxidation, but it is more rheologically unstable - this last point relates to the moisture pickup during the precipitate processing. On the cardboard packaging of the OP-2, the inscription "H.A." refers to its unit component, aluminum naphthenate.

== History ==
The principle of a viscous incendiary weapon was first realized in the early Middle Ages in the form of Greek fire. In modern times, the first tests were carried out during the first world war in the form of solidified oil (SO), developed by CWS. Gasoline and rubber mixtures were tested post-war and during the early stages of WWII. Rubber shortages, caused by the territorial expansion of imperial Japan, forced it to be replaced by synthetic materials.

During the early stages of the WWII, Amfilogiy Pavlovich Ionov, under collaboration of Piotr Alexandrovich Rehbinder, in 1939, specialized aluminum naphthenate to be inserted into fuels in order to thicken them. Their work was perfected by A. A. Trapeznikov and N. A. Bakh at the Institute of Physical Chemistry, Academy of Sciences of the USSR. Industrial-scale production was established in 1941 by the Soviet government, with most soap-producing companies operating under contract.

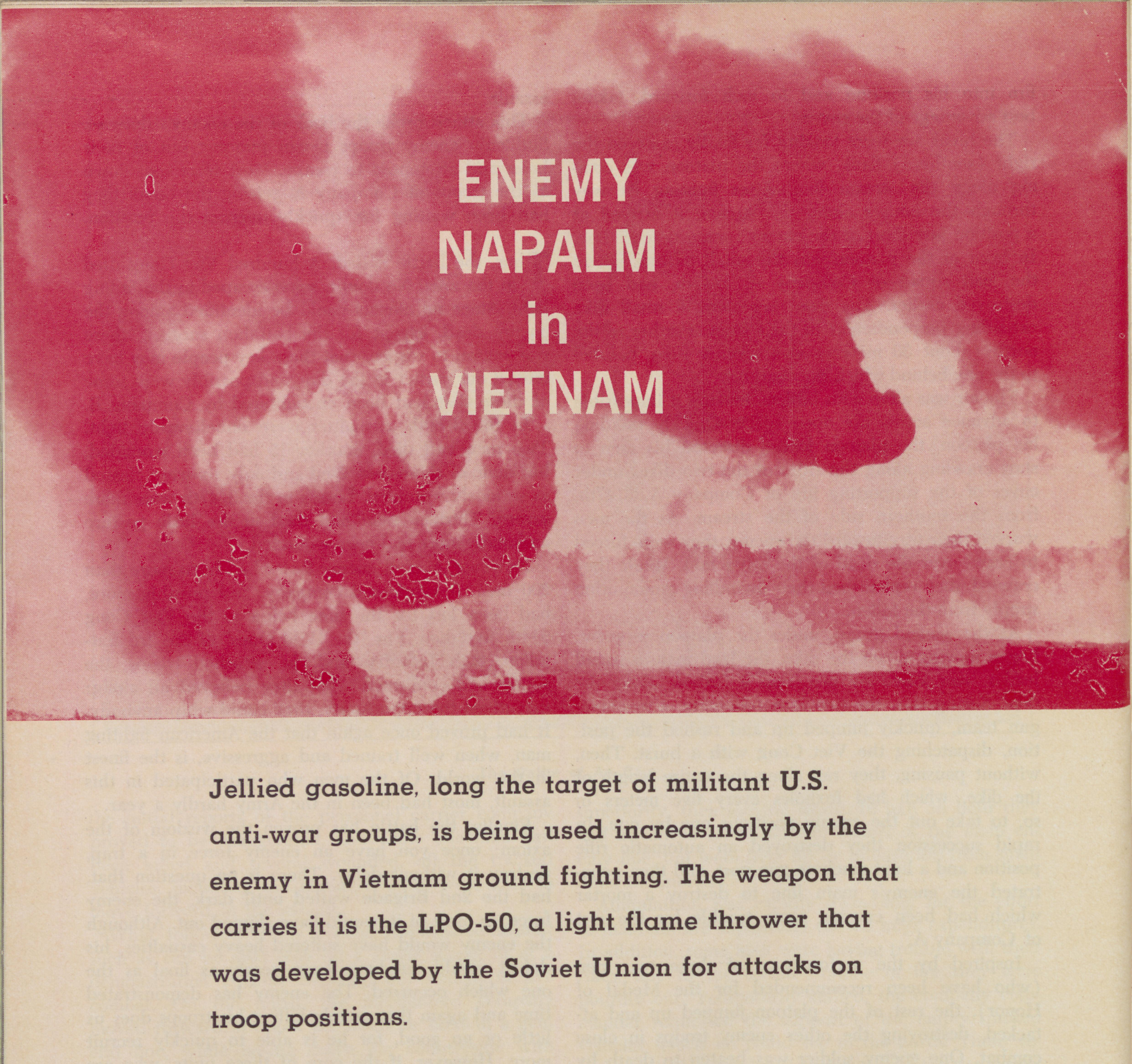
Description in a military magazine about the use of OP-2.

After Pearl Harbor, the CWS began hiring staff to investigate a natural rubber substitute in the United States. The end result of the investigation was a modified aluminum naphthenate called napalm, which was used to thicken thin fuels.

Due to the same orders as the initials of its name, OP-2 was, for a long time, interpreted as being the opalm, a "hybrid" swiss thickener. OP-2 was re-engineered into a new thickener, the NK, its successor.

=== Vietnam War ===
The first documented use of the OP-2 was in May 1967 by the North Vietnamese army at Con Thien. In addition to this first use, it was used against U.S. troops at Kontum, Lang Vei, Quang Ngai, Bihn Dihn, and Loc Ninh.

== Preparation ==
The manufacture of aluminum soaps demands careful control over a multitude of variables. Aluminum naphthenates require extra care in manufacturing conditions, due to their tendency to sinter. Coagulation pH, residual moisture, reaction temperature, method of manufacture and reagent concentration are variables that have the greatest impact on the product's ability to modify fuel rheology. The thickener obtained a satisfactory degree of thickening and stability when it was precipitated into a strongly alkaline aqueous medium.

A caustic excess of 75% is recommended for aluminum soaps in which the raw material has an average molecular weight of 214-250. Unlike classical double ionic displacement reactions in aqueous medium, the reaction product is an adsorption complex between organic acid and hydrated alumina, a similar mechanism is also postulated for other aluminum soaps, but they are not the only ones. Unlike aluminum soaps of monooic aliphatic fatty acids, the thickening and stability value is achieved at a caustic excess of 75%. Although this equation idealizes the precipitation reaction, this deviation is likely due to the presence of dioic, tri-, or polyoic acids.

$\ce{3 OH- + 6 RCOO- + 3 Al+^3 -> 3 (RCOO)2AlOH}$

== See also ==
- Laghman massacre
- Napalm - A modified hydroxyaluminum naphthenate
- Geletrol
- F.R.A.S. - Aluminum hydroxydistearate based fuel
