= Lagonda flamethrower =

Incendiary weapon produced during World War II

The Lagonda flamethrower mounted to a turret on the prototype Cockatrice armoured vehicle

The Lagonda company produced a number of flamethrowers during the Second World War.

Initial developments were for defence against expected German attacks. It was believed that it would act as a deterrent to Luftwaffe dive-bombers targeting the lightly defended Merchant Navy ships and coastal bases of the Fleet Air Arm. The project was jointly managed by special-weapons departments of the Navy and the British Army.

Later on they produced flamethrowers for fitting to armoured vehicles.

== History ==
After the evacuation of the BEF from Dunkirk when the invasion of the United Kingdom seemed imminent, the flamethrower was seen as a suitable defensive weapon. The Petroleum Warfare Department under Donald Banks was set up. Rather than use petrol, a thickened fuel was developed (by R P Fraser at London University) which could be handled safely by pumps. To test this a Commer lorry was modified by the Lagonda Car Company to carry a turret with a projector.

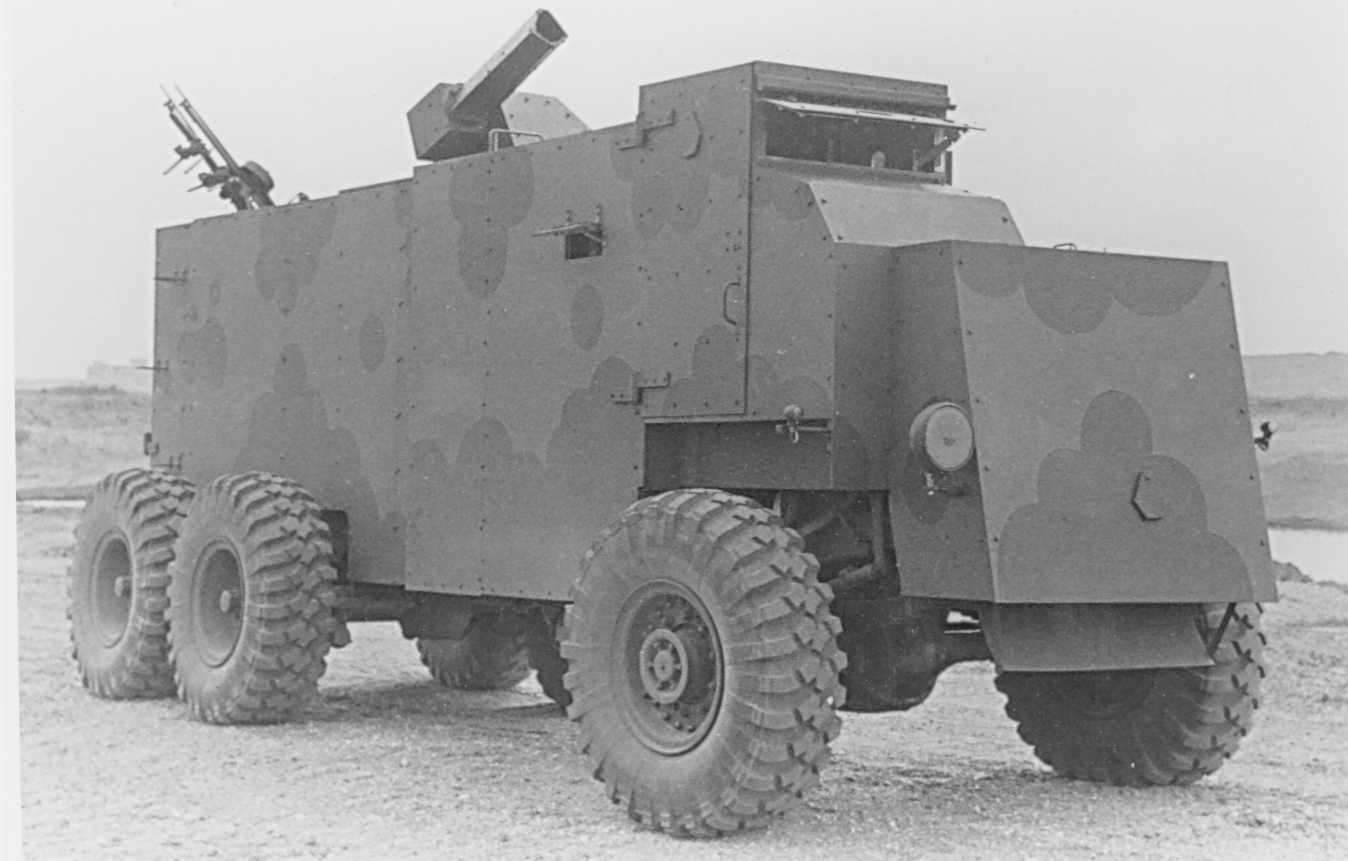
Heavy Cockatrice

A parallel development was the "Heavy Pump Unit" from AEC which used a six-wheeler heavy lorry. The Heavy Pump Unit had two projectors: the main one mounted in a turret capable of projecting up to 300 ft for anti-aircraft use, the other on a detachable carriage. The same AEC lorry chassis was used by the PWD and Lagonda for the "Heavy Cockatrice" while a smaller version on a Bedford QL chassis they gave the "Bedford Cockatrice". AEC used their heavy 4 wheel Matador lorry to produce a prototype of a similar vehicle named the "Basilisk".

For assault rather than defence, it was seen that a tracked vehicle would be a better basis. A Universal Carrier was employed for a prototype. This led to interest from Canada. With Lagonda's help, Canadian forces produced a flamethrower design capable of firing flame 40 yards, which received the codename "Ronson". Lagonda also worked with Major Oke to produce a tank mounted flamethrower that used the tank's auxiliary fuel tank as a reservoir. The Combined Operations Headquarters used this flamethrower in action in the Dieppe Raid.

With the Ronson handed over to the Canadians, Lagonda worked on their own flamethrower installation for the Universal Carrier. The resulting Wasp was produced in two versions; the second capable of shooting over 100 yards. For operations in the jungles of Burma, a tank mounted flamethrower was a "desirable weapon". The Churchill Crocodile was considered unsuitable for this purpose because the fuel and propellant were in a wheeled trailer, which had difficulty with jungle terrain. An internal system with the projector in the turret – known as "Salamander" – was not satisfactory so Lagonda developed an external system codenamed "Adder" (if fitted to a Sherman tank) or "Cobra" (on the Churchill tank). An 80-gallon armour-protected fuel tank was mounted at the rear of the tank and the supply routed along the exterior of the hull to a projector on the front near the co-driver who would control it. Propelled by an inert gas, Adder had a 100-yard range.

== Method of operation ==
The basic premise of the project was to create a weapon capable of shooting a jet of flame high and wide enough to force incoming bomber pilots to either pull out of their dive or brave a pillar of flame potentially capable of damaging or destroying their plane. Designs were solicited from a number of sources, and the feasibility of the plans received was checked by a panel of consultants brought in from the Anglo-Iranian Oil Company. Military engineers then constructed prototypes of the most promising designs and, after testing, demonstrated their capabilities in front of a number of different admirals and generals. The most effective was a design submitted by the Lagonda car company, which fired eight gallons of a diesel oil/tar fuel mixture per second, igniting to produce a continuous gout of flame with a range of nearly 100 feet (30 m), which at its widest point was roughly 30 feet (9 m) in diameter. According to Gerald Pawle, an engineer working on the project, the Lagonda flamethrower impressed and frightened staff officers invited to watch the demonstrations. Further refinements were made to the design which increased its effective range to 200 feet (61 m), though a much larger quantity of fuel was needed to maintain the flame for any significant period of time.

== Trials and operation ==
A trial at sea was arranged to test the effectiveness of the weapon as a deterrent to German aircraft. A prototype flamethrower was installed onto the deck of the French trawler La Patrie, modified to fire vertically. When the RAF pilot arrived, the team responsible for the construction of the flamethrower, worried that the pilot would be killed during the test, briefed him on the effects of the weapon. The results of the test were unimpressive: as instructed, the pilot made his first dummy attack without approaching too closely the area directly above the weapon, which was rigged to fire vertically upwards, but on subsequent runs flew closer and closer to the flame to the point of almost bringing his aircraft directly into the line of fire. The pilot reported that he did not believe the weapon to be an effective deterrent, but admitted that the trials may have been biased by his foreknowledge of their nature. With this in mind, a second trial was arranged with a different pilot. No information at all was given to the man about what he could expect. The results were similar to those of the first trial. The pilot never wavered in his attack, actually brushing half of his wing into the jet of flame. However, it was discovered afterward that there might be another reason behind the failure of the second test. The pilot chosen for the runs had worked in a circus prior to the war, driving cars through rings and walls of fire on a regular basis. In the belief that the Luftwaffe would have very few men with circus experience, limited production of the Lagonda naval flamethrower began, with weapons being installed onto coasters working in and around the River Thames. The flamethrowers were welcomed by captains at first, until they discovered that the weapon required a high level of maintenance to maintain effective fuel pressure, and that expert handling was necessary if the crew wished to avoid being coated in tar.

While the installed flamethrowers did not produce a single confirmed enemy casualty before the end of the war, information gathered by the British Secret Intelligence Service suggested that the weapons had two noticeable effects upon the German armed forces. Firstly, trials were observed of a similar naval defensive flamethrower project involving a long mast-mounted pipe, which suffered similar setbacks to the British weapon – a number of trials ended with the attending officers and all others on the shore nearby being coated with oil. Secondly, partly as a result of the Lagonda flamethrower and partly due to other deterrent weapons such as the Parachute and Cable (PAC) system and the Holman Projector, the average height of German bombers attacking merchant ships increased to well above 200 ft, the altitude at which bombs had been successfully hitting on roughly 50% of the drops.

== Service history ==
The Bedford Cockatrice was ordered for the defence of the coastal bases of the Fleet Air Arm in the event of glider- or parachute-dropped invasion troops. It was estimated that such troops would need roughly one minute upon landing to detach themselves from their equipment and open fire, and so the Cockatrice was believed to be the ideal fast-response defence vehicle, able to kill or terrorise into surrender a force of the small size expected to be attacking such remote airfields. Sixty Cockatrice were built and served at Royal Navy Air Stations. The RAF received six Heavy Cockatrice for airfield defence.

Three Oke-equipped Churchill tanks were used on the Dieppe Raid.

== See also ==
- Churchill Crocodile
- Flamethrower, Portable, No 2, or "Ack-pack", a portable flamethrower used by British infantry in the same period.
- List of flamethrowers
