= Geletrol =

Gasoline thickener used in World War II

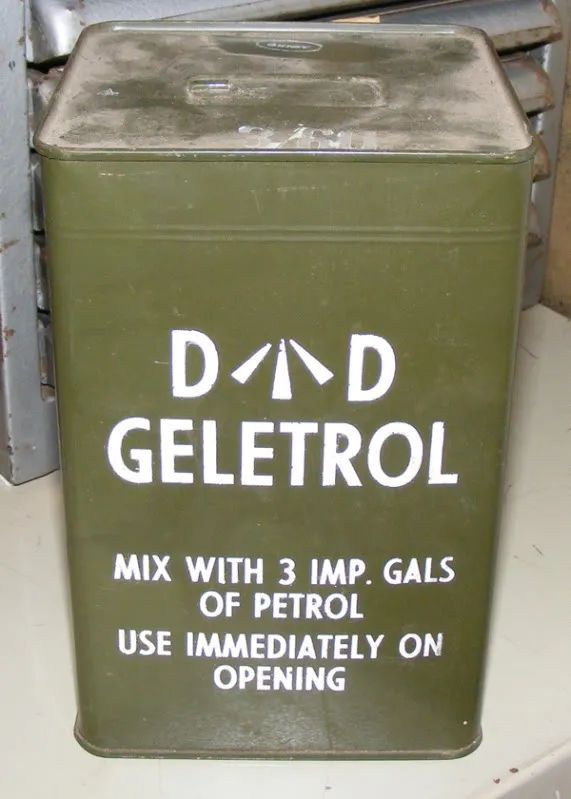
- A can of Geletrol thickener
- Type: Flamethrower fuel gelling agent
- Place of origin: Australia

Service history
- In service: From 1944
- Used by: Australian army
- Wars: World War II

Production history
- Manufacturer: Fletcher Chemical Company (Melbourne); Robert Corbett Pty Ltd (Sydney)
- Produced: October 1944 onwards

Geletrol is a gasoline soap-type thickener used during World War II for incendiary warfare purposes by the Australian army.

== Composition ==
Geletrol is the trade name for a form of aluminium oleate, a chemical substance of empirical formula (C_{18}H_{33}O_{2})_{1,7}Al(OH)_{1,3}. The active component in thickening the material is hydroxyaluminum dioleate, is a amorphous solid derived from aluminum hydroxide and oleic acid, non-uniformly composed, supplied in granular powder form. Aluminum oleates of the same empirical composition had already been investigated by W. R., Henry and W. F., Faragher 20 years earlier.

Aluminum soaps from oleic acid are moderately satisfactory, being generally inferior to napalm and aluminum naphthenate. The main disadvantage of oleic acid aluminum soaps, in addition to chemical instability, is the high loss of viscosity over time, with 80% being lost in approximately one month, for 8% concentration gels. In comparison, unstable napalm loses approximately 12% its viscosity in the same period for 8% solutions. The high instability of gels is not only related to chemical instability, but its chemical structure and, to a small degree, the manufacturing method adopted, as observed in the investigation on the Cambridge's gel. If the oleic acid used has an iodine value of 76-78, which corresponds to a proportion of 83-87% oleic acid and 13-17% saturated acid composed of palmitic acid and stearic acid, is expected to have a more stable viscosity than its unitary counterpart.

== History ==
Research into a gasoline thickener was started in 1943 in Maribyrnong, Victoria, at the suggestion of the Chemical Defense Board. Various substances, mainly metallic soaps, were tried. There was no conclusion to the investigation, and it was then abandoned for a time.

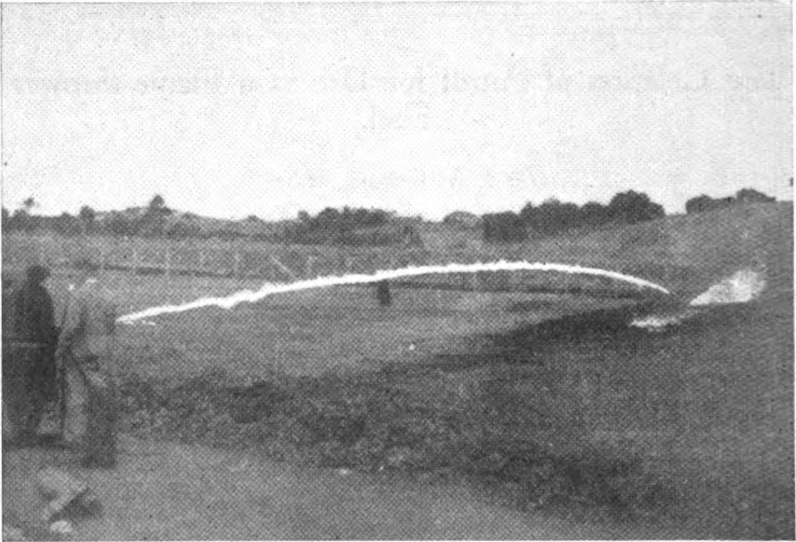
A shot with gelled petrol (4,5 per cent. Geletrol) showing the thin rod-like nature of the jet and the increased range obtained.

The investigation was resumed when the U.S. Army discovered that the employment of thickened fuel was highly effective in neutralizing Japanese bunkers.

In early 1944, representatives of the Australian Army requested from the Lubricants and Bearings Section through the Scientific Liaison Bureau that some considered methods of gelling gasoline for flamethrower fuels.

The American and British armies had different methods of preparing fuels for flamethrowers. The British army developed a specific form of aluminum stearate that required a specialized process to manufacture its incendiary fuel. The British process prepared two types of incendiary fuels:

1. Fuel for portable flamethrowers: Lower viscosity fuel contained in 8-gallon imperial drums.
2. Fuel for mechanized flamethrowers: Higher viscosity fuel contained in 45-gallon imperial drums.

The "British method" was considered unsuitable for Australian purposes. The Australian method required fuel to be prepared in the field by treating ordinary gasoline. The gelling agent, called napalm, employed by the US Army met these requirements, but was not available in quantity to the Army, and the materials used in the preparation of napalm were not procurable. The problem, therefore, was to develop a suitable and simple method with local materials.

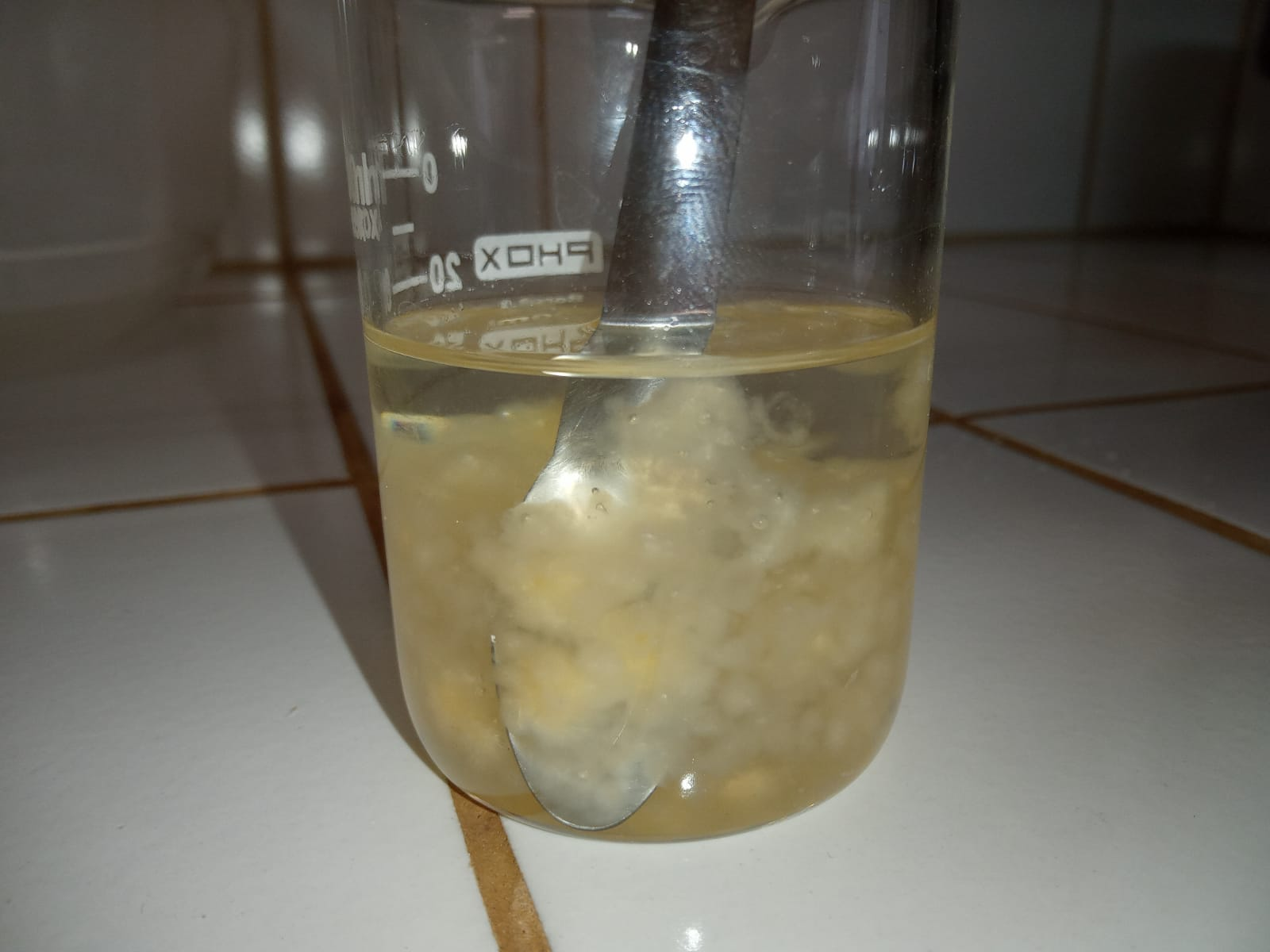
Demonstration of the dilating effect of an unsaturated fatty acid aluminum soap in a 4% (w/w) solution.

Information obtained from the Vacuum Oil Company has shown that metal oleates can be suitable thickeners. As a preliminary investigation, about 20 soaps of oleic acid of different basicities were tested. The preliminary result showed that the only suitable oleate was mono- and dihydroxylated aluminum oleate. Research continued on the development of this form of aluminum oleate, in order to find the best degree of substitution of functional groups.

The thickener was adopted in October 1944. The first use of the thickener was in portable flamethrowers (M1 and M2). Later, the Department of Munitions produced a mechanised flame-thrower capable of being mounted on tanks. The flamethrower was adapted for the matilda tank. Flame-throwers were used by Australian troops in New Guinea, Balikpapan, Bougainville and Borneo in 1945. The employment of the thickener was requested in tons per week.

Manufacturing of Geletrol was done locally by Fletcher Chemical Company of Melbourne, and Robert Corbett Pty Ltd of Sydney. It was produced in two sized proportions: 20-pound cans for mechanized flamethrowers and 2-pound cans for portable flamethrowers.

== Preparation ==
It is designed to be produced on a full scale from a double displacement reaction between the respective soap with caustic excess and an aluminum salt at 60-80 degrees Celsius. Aluminum oleate containing 10-11% Al_{2}O_{3} provides the best overall gelling and handling properties. Due to the presence of unsaturated bonding, the product is susceptible to oxidation, requiring the intimate addition of an antioxidant, usually beta and/or alpha-naphthol.

The preparation of the Geletrol involves variables, these related to chemistry. When pure reagents is used, the ideal caustic excess is 83.74%. When applied under the influence of the variables, the caustic excess is 82 to 88%. The expression that represents the concentration of aluminum as a function of caustic excess is given by the linear function, y is the dependent variable, Al_{2}O_{3}%, and x is the independent variable, free OH^{-}%.

$y = 6.1311 + 0.0442x$

Based on its empirical formula, its caustic excess is 76.5%. Aluminum soaps of unsaturated fatty acids with an Al₂O₃ concentration of 10–11% exhibit anomalous thickening capacity, forming jellies at concentrations of 4%, surpassing that of napalm. However, they are highly unstable. Precipitation with a large excess of caustic soda does not significantly affect the concentration of free fatty acids, which largely depends on the pH of the medium. Aluminum soaps of unsaturated fatty acids are more sensitive to lower pH values than their saturated counterparts.

== Similar ==
- Oleopalm - aluminum oleate/cocoate (80:20); 0.5-0.8 1-naphtol; 60% caustic excess; 72 °C drying
- Alumagel - Hydroxyaluminum dioleate containing free fatty acids and a co-precipitated intermicellar crosslinking agent.
- Lastol - Aluminum soyate/cocoate (80:20); 1% PVA_{c}; 2% BHT; 70% caustic excess; 90°C drying
- Linol - Aluminum soyate with 2% BHT; 85% caustic excess; 90°C drying
- ORFol - Aluminum soap from purified residual frying oils.
- Steolate - aluminum oleate/stearate (60:40); 1% 1-naphthol; 30-55% caustic excess; 70°C drying
- W - Aluminum soap from meat processing byproducts.
