= Zippo (disambiguation) =

Zippo may refer to:

- Zippo, a brand of refillable metal lighters
- M67 Zippo, a flamethrowing variant of the American Patton tank
- M132 armored flamethrower, nicknamed "Zippo"
- Zippo 200 at the Glen, a NASCAR Nationwide Series race in New York state
- Zippo, a character from Dinotopia (miniseries)
