= Flammenwerfer 41 =

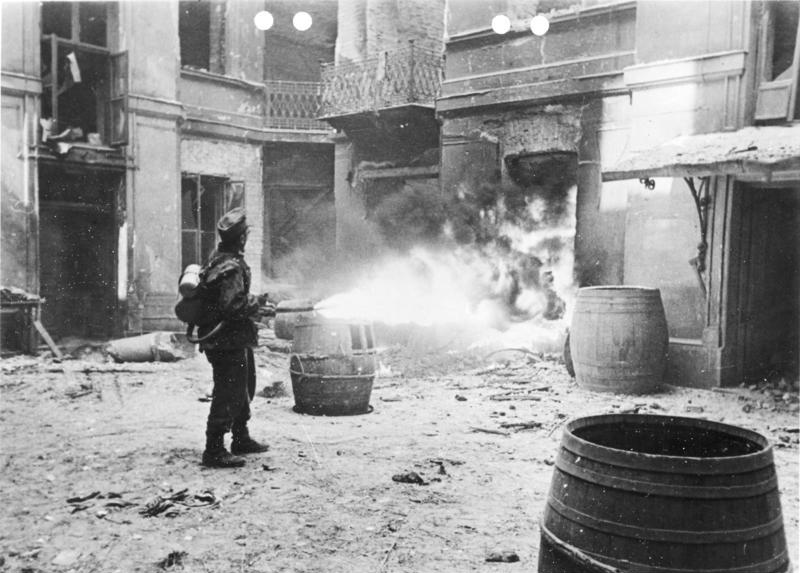
- A German soldier torching buildings during the Warsaw Uprising
- Type: Flamethrower
- Place of origin: Nazi Germany

Service history
- In service: 1941–1945
- Used by: German Army
- Wars: Second World War

Specifications
- Mass: 40 pounds (18 kg)
- Action: Nitrogen
- Effective firing range: 32 m
- Feed system: Nitrogen and fuel gas tank

The Flammenwerfer 41, or FmW 41, was the standard German flamethrower beginning in 1941 and an upgraded version of the earlier Flammenwerfer 35, whose main issue was its excessive weight of 36 kg (79 lb), double that of the FmW 41 that was 18 kg (40 lb). It performed a similar role of other flamethrowers of the time, namely clearing enemy trenches and buildings in highly fortified areas. From 1942 to April 1945, 64,284 examples were produced. After 1945, flamethrowers steadily decreased in usage globally, with the Bundeswehr not using any.

Similar to many other designs of the time, the FmW 41 used a hydrogen torch to ignite a tar and petrol mixture which was fired from a hand-held torch attached to a tank. The petrol and propellant were carried in separate tanks carried on the back which held 11.8 litres (2.6 imp gal; 3.1 US gal) of tar and petrol mixture called Flammöl 19. The FmW 41 proved to be more reliable and easier to operate than its predecessor, it had an increased range of 32 metres (105 ft). and was lighter weighing in at 28.7 kilograms (63 lb).

Problems surfaced against Soviet troops during the winter of 1941 as its lighting mechanism was unable to cope with the cold weather conditions. Later versions of the weapon replaced the hydrogen torch with a cartridge based system which proved more effective.

== See also ==
- List of flamethrowers
