= Churchill Crocodile =

British flame-throwing tank

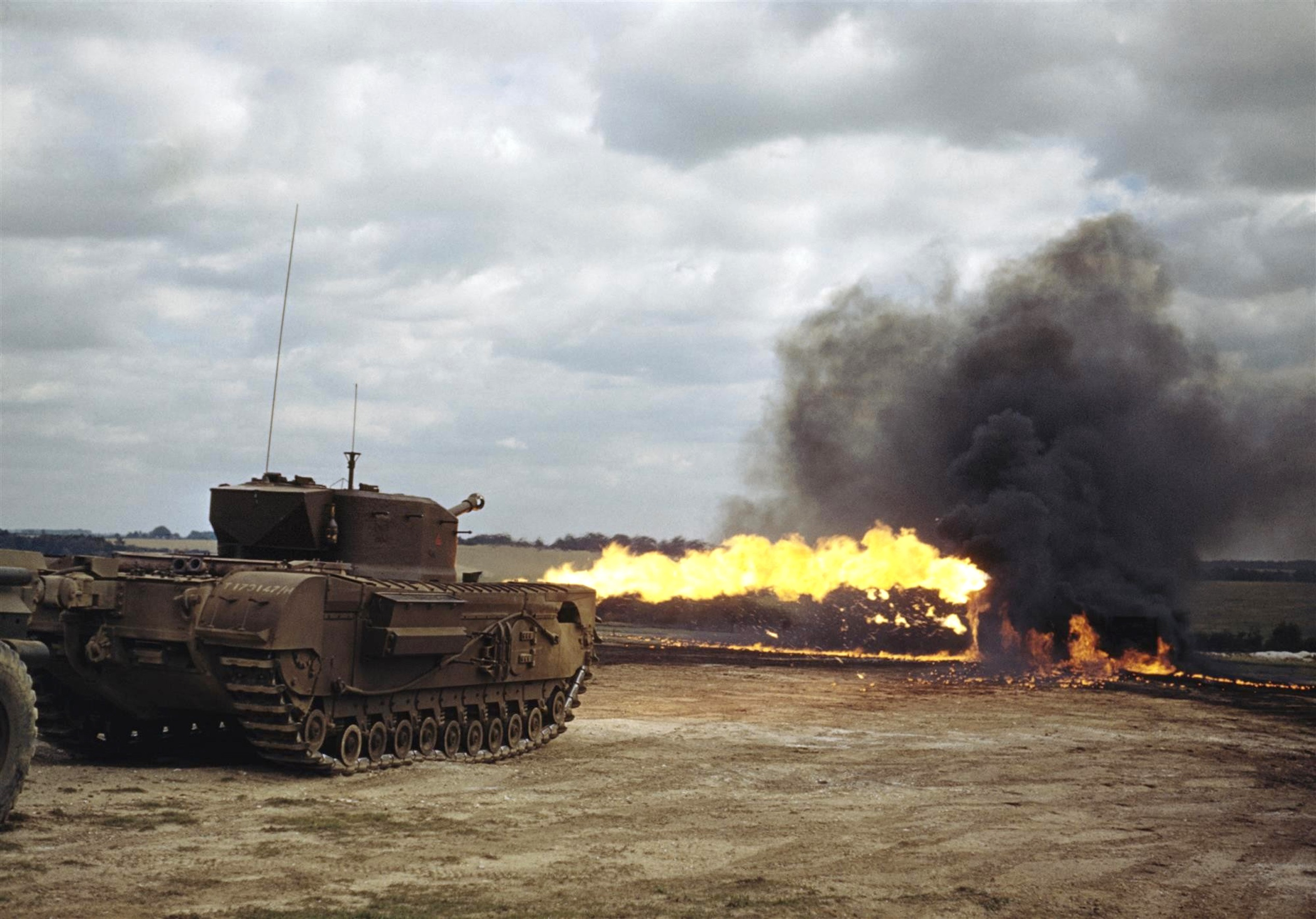
- A Churchill Crocodile firing its flame-projector
- Type: Infantry tank/Flame tank
- Place of origin: United Kingdom

Service history
- In service: 1944–1951
- Used by: United Kingdom
- Wars: Second World War; Korean War

Production history
- Designed: 1944
- Produced: 1944

Specifications
- Crew: 5 (commander, gunner, driver, radio operator/loader, co-driver/flamethrower gunner)
- Armour: 152mm hull and turret front, 95mm hull sides and turret sides and rears, 51mm hull rear
- Main armament: Ordnance QF 75 mm
- Secondary armament: Flame thrower, 1 x coax Besa machine gun
- Engine: See Churchill tank See Churchill tank
- Fuel capacity: See Churchill tank

The Churchill Crocodile was a British flame-throwing tank of late Second World War. It was a variant of the Churchill tank, a heavily armoured infantry tank. The flamethrower was mounted in the hull of the tank with the fuel in a trailer pulled behind.

The Crocodile was introduced as one of the specialised armoured vehicles developed under Major-General Percy Hobart, informally known as "Hobart's Funnies". It was produced from October 1943, in time for the Normandy invasion.

Although originally developed for the Mark IV, the latest Mark VII variant of the Churchill was used.

== Design and development ==
From early in the war, there had been experiments with mounting flamethrowers on British vehicles, leading to vehicles such as the Cockatrice, Basilisk and the Wasp (the latter being a flamethrower on a Universal Carrier). The Churchill Oke, a flamethrower-carrying Churchill Mark II developed by a Royal Tank Regiment officer, was tested operationally on the Dieppe Raid. Parallel development work was carried out by the Petroleum Warfare Department, AEC and the Ministry of Supply (MoS) on Valentine tanks. The Department of Tank Design preferred the Churchill, which was the infantry tank successor to the Valentine, as a basis for further work.

The General Staff decided a flamethrower based on the Churchill using the Petroleum Warfare Department's design was required. The main armament of the tank was to be retained. The specification was for a minimum of a minute of flame with an effective range of 80 yards and the fuel to be in a jettisonable trailer. Twelve pilot models were ordered in July 1942. War Office policy reversed this decision in August 1942; tanks were thought to be too vulnerable at close range and the flamethrowers should be manpack or Carrier types. The PWD continued with development work of a trailer and equipment including improvements in the fuel. The thickened fuel gave better performance in terms of range and effect on the target.

After Major-General Percy Hobart saw the Crocodile demonstrated in 1943, he put pressure on the MoS to produce a development plan. The Chief of the General Staff added the flamethrowers to the 79th Division plan. A Royal Armoured Corps advisor to the General Staff Major-General Alec Richardson was shown the prototype in January 1943 and it was also demonstrated for the War Office in March. The project was given permission for 250 units in August 1943 The ordering before troop trials with prototypes was necessary to get the units built in time for the planned invasion of France in 1944. The prototypes were under construction by October; at around that time it was decided to modify the design of the equipment so it could be used on the new Mark VII Churchill as well as the Mark IV that it had been originally designed for. The requirement for it to fit the Mark IV was subsequently dropped.

The first prototypes Mark VII were delivered to troops in January 1944 and production vehicles in April. The order had been increased to 750; then extended by a further 200 for use in India and South East Asia.

== Final design ==
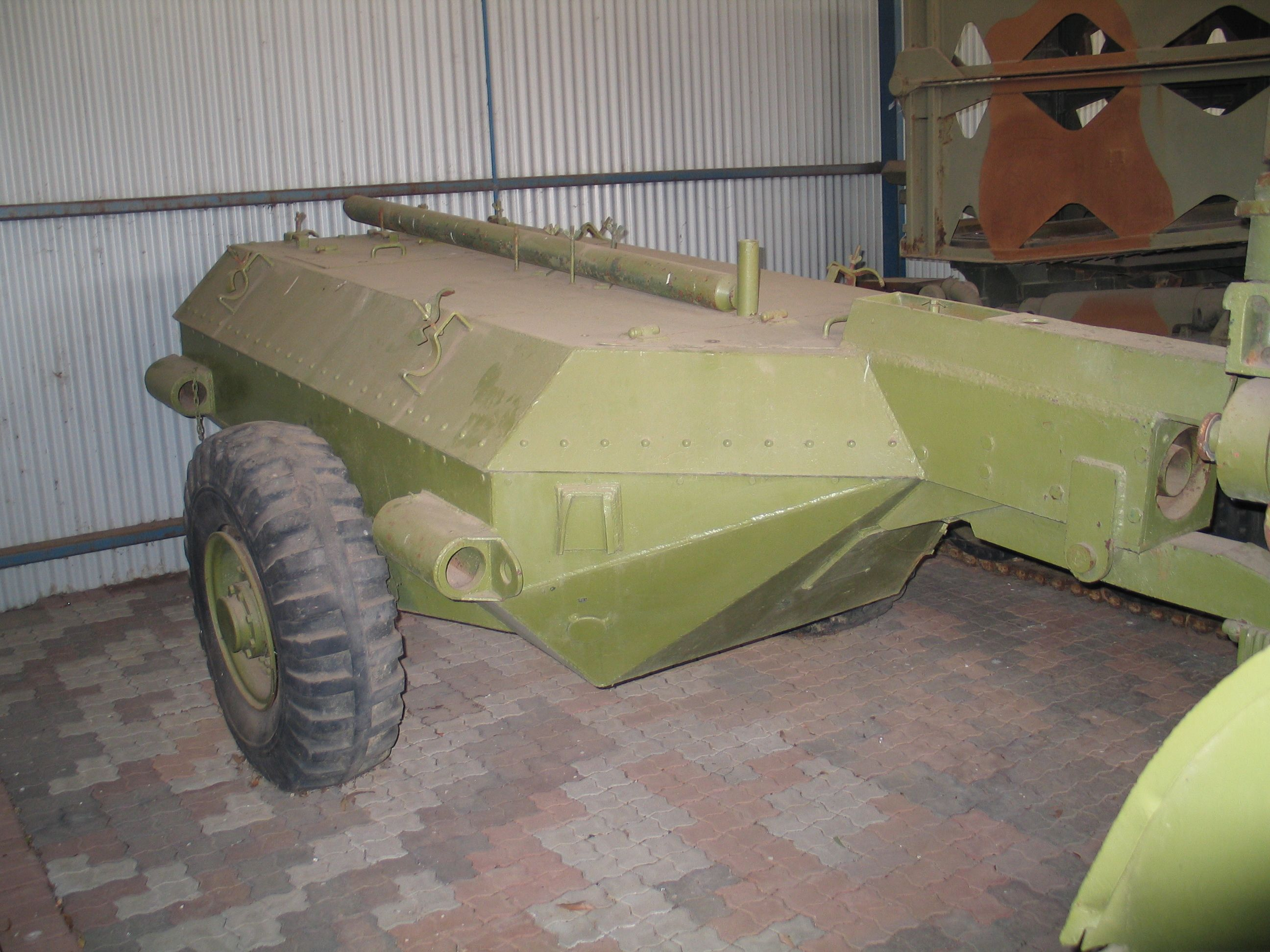
The armoured fuel trailer for the Churchill Crocodile, Royal Australian Armoured Corps Museum (2007)

The flamethrower equipment was produced as a kit that REME workshops could fit in the field, converting any available Churchill Mk VII, although in practice field conversion was rarely done, if it was ever done at all, as it made more sense for the flame tanks to be allocated to designated units that had been specially trained to operate them.

The conversion kit consisted of the trailer, an armoured pipe fitted along the underside of the tank, and the projector, which replaced the hull-mounted Besa machine gun. The Crocodile retained its turret-mounted Ordnance QF 75 mm gun, so could still operate as a tank. The kit could also fit the Churchill Mk VIII, which was identical to the Mk VII except that it was fitted with a 95 mm howitzer instead of a 75 mm gun; a very small number were converted to Crocodiles.

Of the 800 kits produced, 250 were held in reserve for possible operations against the Japanese. The remainder were enough to arm three regiments of tanks, and for training and as replacements for battlefield casualties.

The Crocodile's six and a half ton armoured trailer carried 400 imperial gallons (1,800 L) of fuel and five cylinders containing compressed gas propellant. (Note: Initially compressed air was used, but later the preference was to use compressed nitrogen.) This was enough for eighty one-second bursts. Filling the trailer was laborious work and was usually done from standard 45-gallon drums. To make the task easier, it was common to construct an elevated structure of scaffolding poles that allowed the drums to be rolled out of the truck that delivered them to a position over the trailer, so the fuel could be poured straight in.

The fuel was an incendiary mixture called Fuel K, redesignated in the year 1944 to FTF, Heavy No. 1 (FRAS), in its version for mechanized flamethrowers.. The trailer was filled with 8 drums of 45 gallons each or 50 drums of 8 gallons capacity, designated for M1A1 flamethrowers.. To achieve the greatest operating distance, the fuel used should be that stored in 45 gallon drums.

The trailer connected to the tank by a three-way armoured coupling, (Note: The coupling coped with Yaw, pitch, and roll of the trailer with respect to the tank) and could be jettisoned from within the tank if necessary. The trailer's armour could resist small-arms fire, but would be penetrated by heavier weapons. Therefore, in action, Crocodile crews used their tank to shield the trailer from enemy fire as best they could.

For transport over long distances, Crocodile units were issued with AEC Matador lorries to tow the trailers. The tanks themselves were moved on tank transporters.

== Flame projector ==
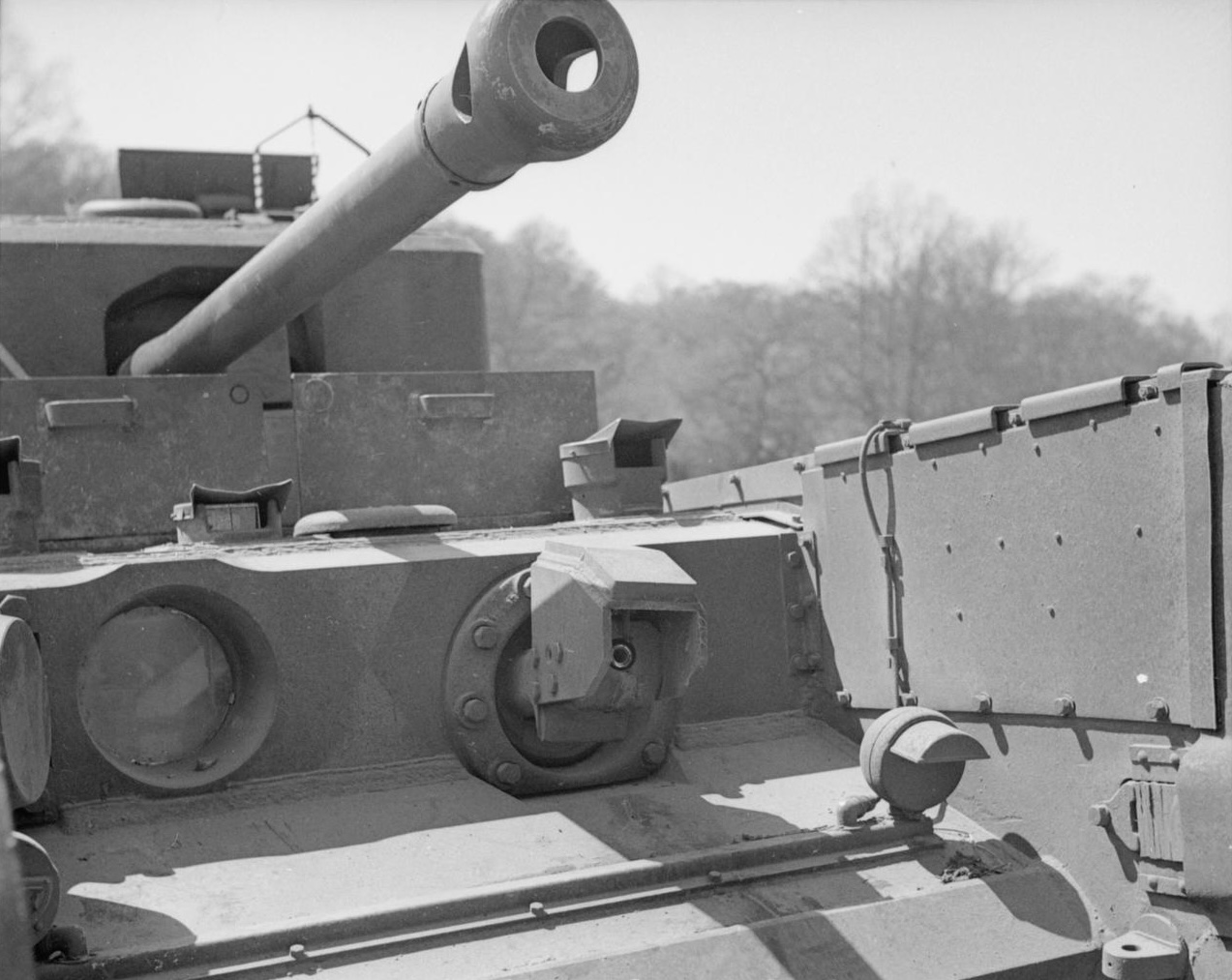
The flame projector on a Crocodile tank, photographed during trials in April 1944

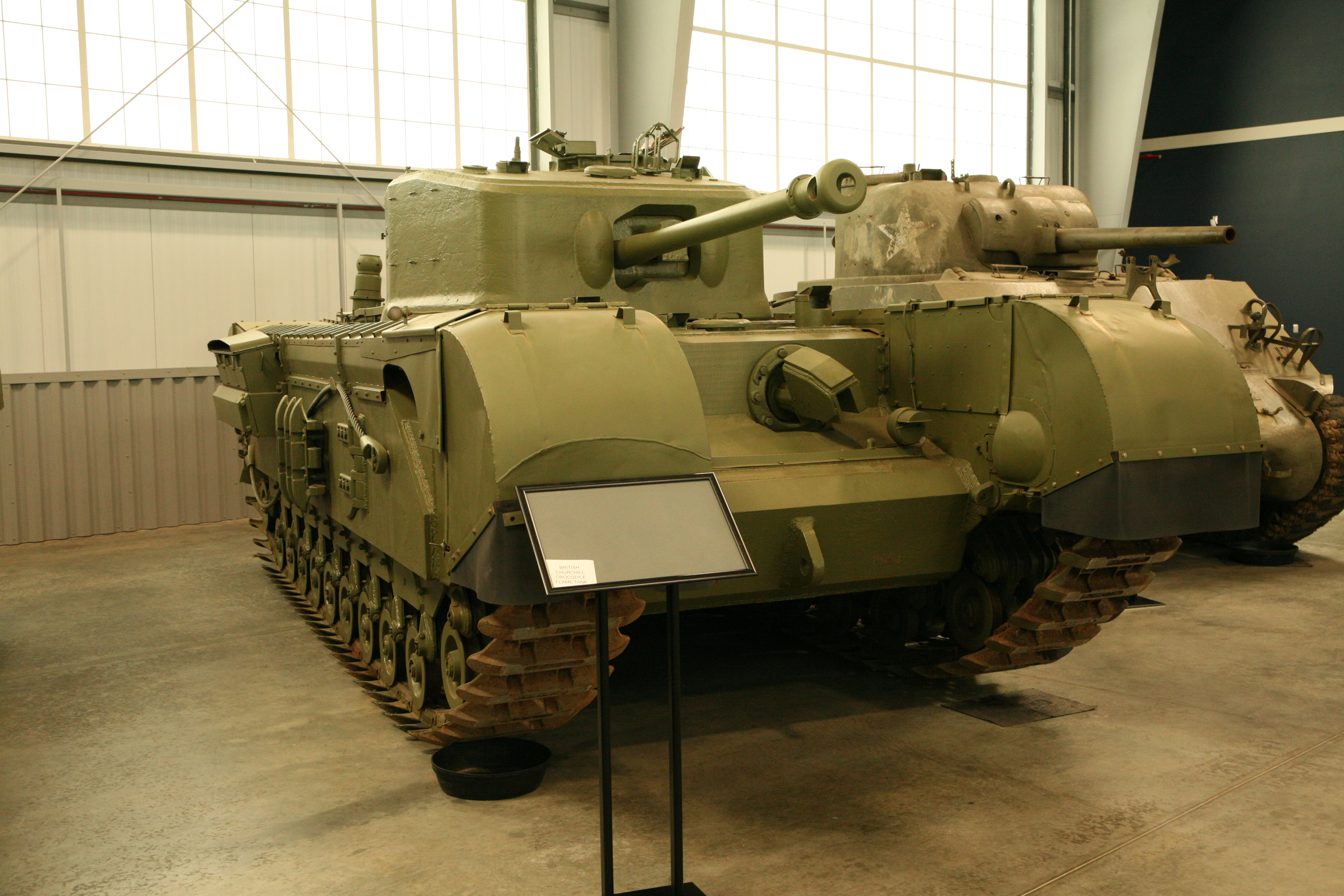
Churchill Crocodile at the U.S. Army Armor and Cavalry Collection, Fort Benning, in 2023

The thrower had a range of up to 120 yards (110 m), and some sources quote 150 yards (140 m). but generally the range was around 80 yards (73 m)

To ignite the flame, the projector used a fine spray of petrol from the Crocodile's main fuel tank; this was ignited by a spark plug, and in turn ignited the main fuel jet. The operator could spray long or short bursts of flaming fuel onto the target. The operator could also spray the target with fuel, then ignite it with a short, lit burst. There was sufficient fuel for 80 single second bursts or equivalent continuous fire. The trailer could be jettisoned if it was hit, or once empty to give the tank greater freedom of movement. The trailers were fitted with towbars so they could be collected after the action by unit transport.

Refuelling took at least 90 minutes and pressurization around 15 minutes; the pressure required had to be primed on the trailer by the crew as close to use as feasible because pressure could not be maintained for very long. The fuel was projected at a rate of 4 imperial gallons (18 L) per second. The fuel burned on water and could be used to set fire to woods and houses.

== Service ==
The Crocodile was a specialised weapon with an effective, but short-range, flamethrower. Used by units of the 79th Armoured Division in concert with the Churchill AVRE, and other Funnies, the Crocodile was an effective assault weapon, used so successfully against bunkers that many surrendered after the first ranging shots. The flame projector was a powerful psychological weapon, so feared by the Germans that captured Crocodile crews were often summarily executed. Aspects of the mechanism were considered by the British to be so secret that disabled units, if they could not be recovered, were rapidly destroyed by any means, even air strike if necessary.

British Crocodiles supported the U.S. Army in the Normandy bocage, at the Battle for Brest, and during Operation Clipper, the Anglo-American assault on Geilenkirchen. C Squadron also supported the 53rd (Welsh) Division assault on 's-Hertogenbosch in October 1944. In 1945 Crocodiles were used to burn the typhus infested huts at the Bergen-Belsen concentration camp.

The units that used the Crocodile in North west Europe, generally as part of 31st Armoured Brigade, were:

- 1st Fife and Forfar Yeomanry
- 141st Regiment Royal Armoured Corps (The Buffs, Royal East Kent Regiment) - 13th Troop, C Squadron saw action on the first day of the Normandy invasion.
- 7th Royal Tank Regiment

In Italy, the 25th Armoured Assault Brigade operated Crocodiles.

From late 1950 until their withdrawal in 1951, Churchill Crocodiles served in Korea as part C Squadron, 7th Royal Tank Regiment in 29th Brigade.

== Other tanks ==
It was proposed that the Crocodile system be adapted for use with the M4 Sherman tank by US forces. The equipment had to be modified as the flame projector could not be fitted in place of the hull machine gun as it had been on the Churchill. Instead the projector was mounted on a platform to the right of the hull gunner under an armoured housing; the fuel line ran alongside the hull under an armoured cover. The British undertook to supply 100 conversion kits to the Americans prior to D-Day and a prototype Sherman Crocodile was constructed and six production examples were under construction, but American interest in the system waned and they adopted an American-developed flame variant of the Sherman. In combat this performed poorly and American interest in the Crocodile was revived. Four Sherman Crocodiles were supplied to the US 739th Tank Battalion. They were used only once, during Operation Grenade, against the heavily defended, 13th-century citadel in the town of Jülich. After heavy use of both their flame projecters and their main guns, the tanks were able to force the German defenders to abandon the fortress.

Post war, towing trials over an obstacle course were conducted using a Crocodile trailer and a Comet tank. But the trailer coupling broke and the work went no further.

== Surviving vehicles ==
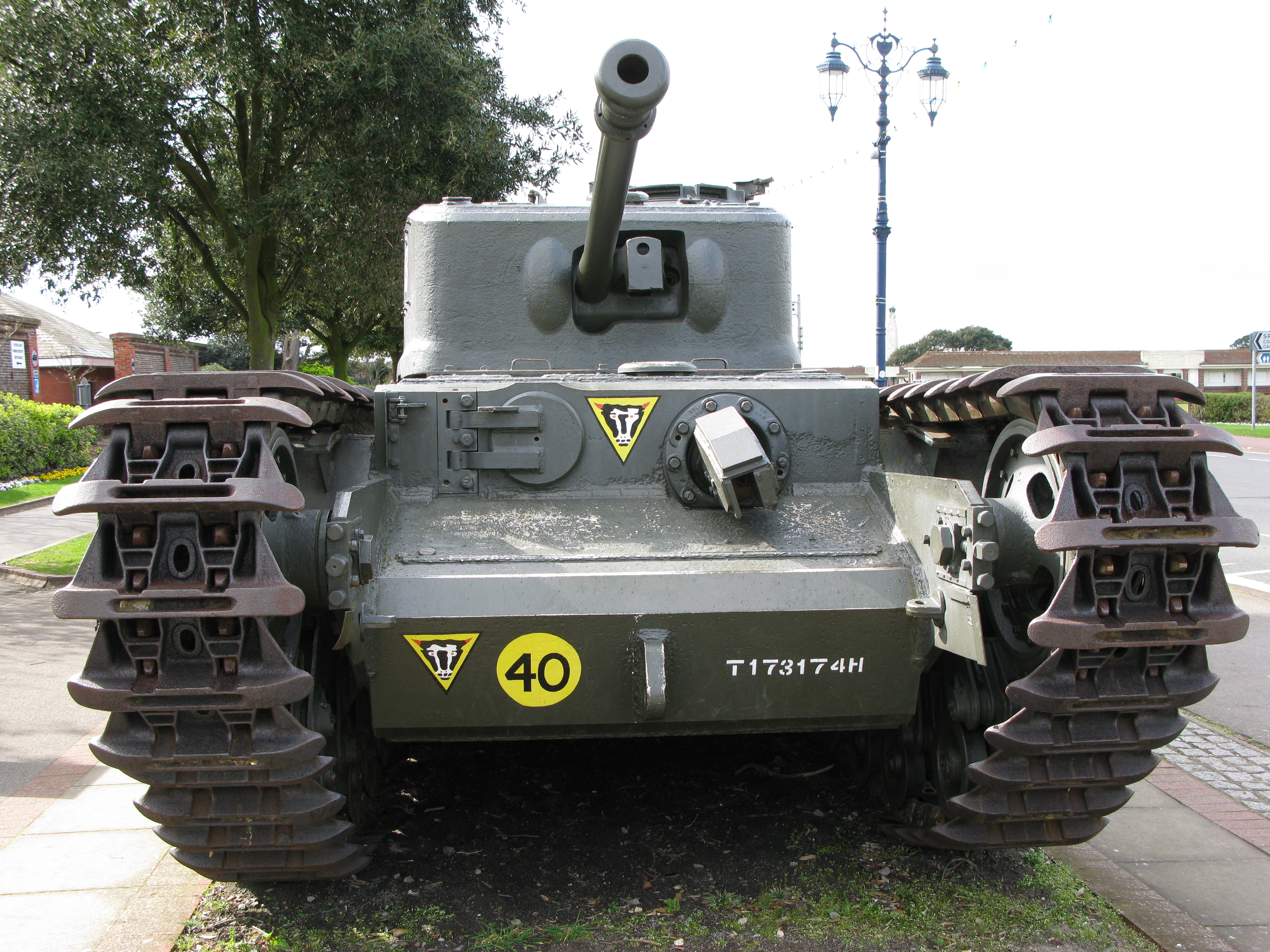
The Churchill Crocodile at the D-Day museum, Portsmouth (2008)

Mark VII Crocodiles are owned by the Muckleburgh Collection in Norfolk, the Cobbaton Combat Collection in Devon, Eden Camp Museum in North Yorkshire, the D-Day museum in Portsmouth, the Wheatcroft Collection, the Kubinka Tank Museum in Russia and The Military Museums, Calgary, Alberta. A Mark VIII is at the Royal Australian Armoured Corps Museum. Two (one in running order) are privately owned in the UK. One in running order is under private ownership in the USA. Another in running order is on display at the American Heritage Museum in the USA. One example without a trailer is on display at the Bayeux Museum of the Battle of Normandy. Another example with a trailer is held at the Bovington Tank Museum. Another, complete with a trailer, is on display on Fort Montbarey parade ground in Brest (Brittany); it was given as a Memorial by Queen Elizabeth II.

== Notes ==
Footnotes

Citations
