= Flammenwerfer 35 =

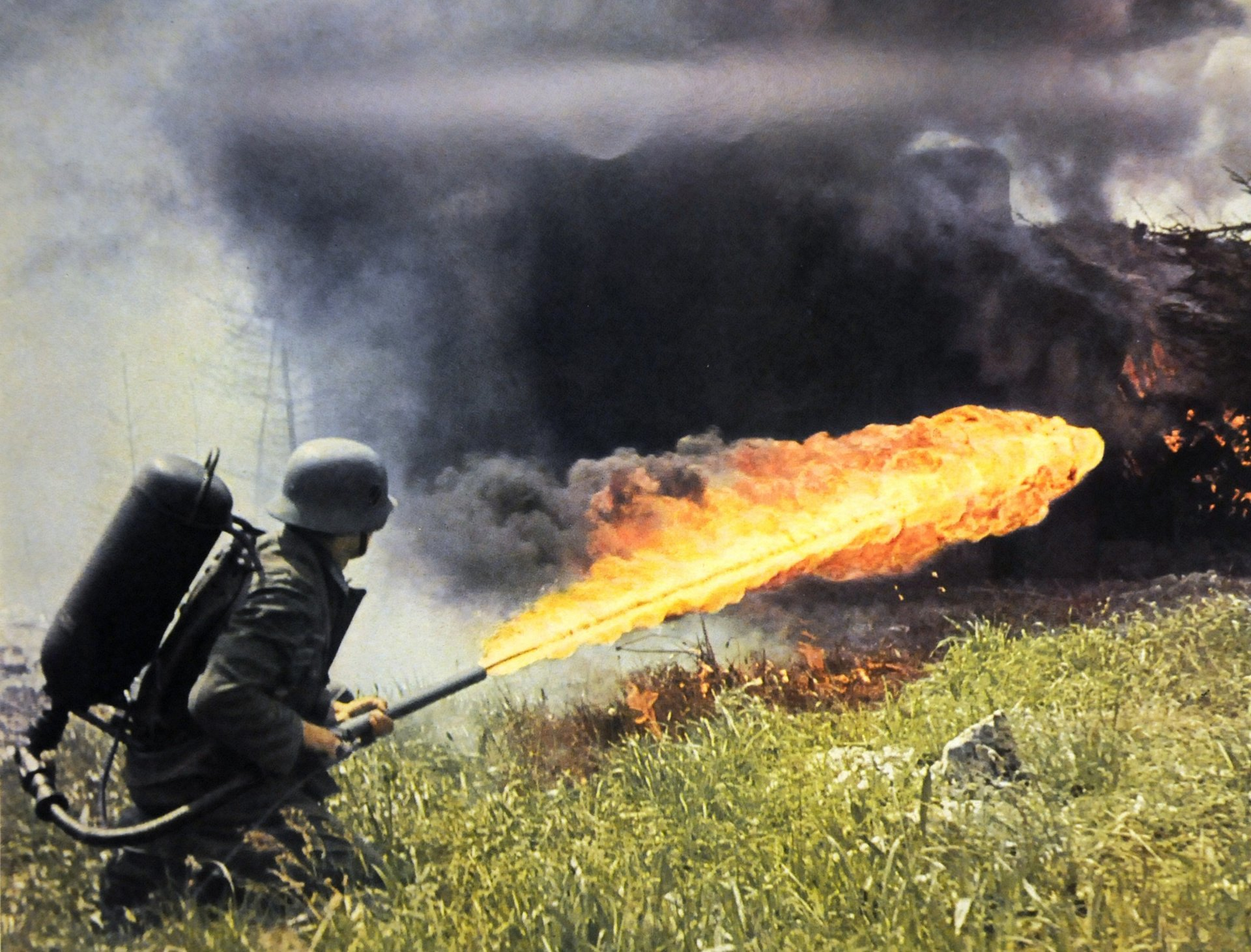
- Type: Flamethrower
- Place of origin: Nazi Germany

Service history
- In service: 1935–1945
- Used by: German Army
- Wars: Second World War

Production history
- Manufacturer: Different manufacturers
- Produced: 1935–1941

Specifications
- Mass: 35.8kg (79lb)
- Crew: 1
- Action: nitrogen
- Rate of fire: 1180ml/s, 10 consecutive seconds
- Effective firing range: 25 m
- Maximum firing range: 27–33 yards (25–30 m)
- Feed system: 1 (3 gal) gasoline compound (fuel); 1 Nitrogen tank (propellant)
- Sights: None

The Flammenwerfer 35, or FmW 35 (flame thrower) was a one-man German flamethrower used during World War II to clear out trenches and buildings. It could project fuel up to 25 meters from the user.

== Description ==
It weighed 35.8 kilograms (79 lb), and held 11.8 litres (2.6 imp gal; 3.1 US gal) of flaming oil, (Flammöl 19), petrol mixed with tar to make it heavier and to give it better range, which was ignited by a hydrogen torch providing about 10 seconds of continuous use. The firing device is activated at the same time with the Selbstschlussventil and is inside the protective pipe. The Flammenwerfer 35 was produced until 1941, when the lighter, slightly redesigned Flammenwerfer 41 began replacing it.

== Use ==
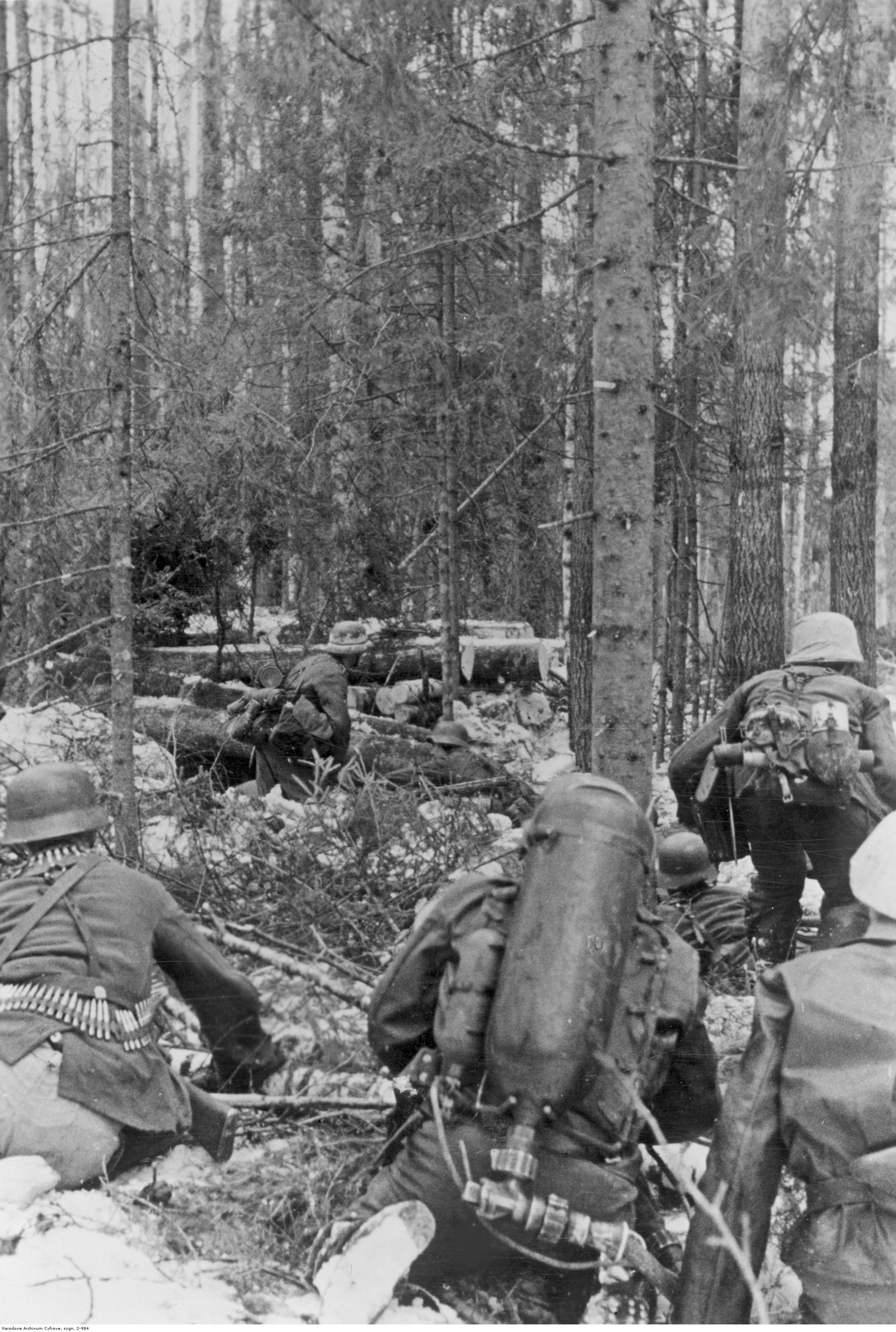
German infantry taking cover behind trees on the Eastern Front. One man carries the Flammenwerfer 35.

This flamethrower, like all flamethrowers employed by the Wehrmacht, was exclusively used by sturmpionieres (assault pioneers); specialist pioneers who were to assist the infantry in an assault, by overcoming natural and man-made obstacles for the infantry, clearing enemy fortifications with flamethrowers and then destroying them with demolition charges. The sturmpionieres that exclusively used these flamethrowers played an important part in overcoming French fortifications blocking the German advance during the Battle of France. More specifically the Battle of Sedan (1940).

== See also ==
- List of flamethrowers
