= M132 armored flamethrower =

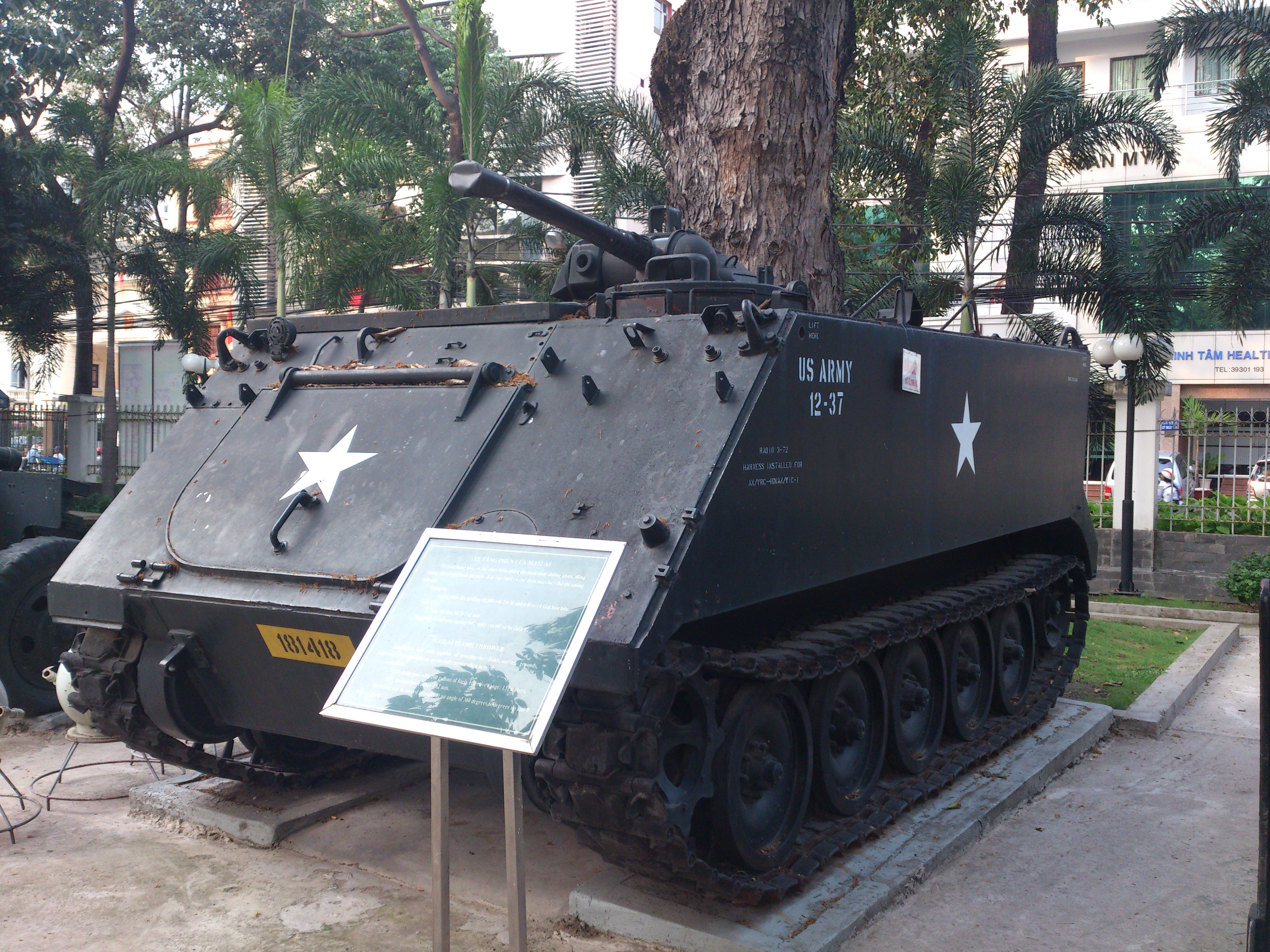
- Ex-US Army M132 armored flamethrower on display at the War Remnants Museum in Ho Chi Minh City, Vietnam.
- Type: Armored personnel carrier
- Place of origin: United States

Service history
- In service: 1964–1978
- Used by: United States
- Wars: Vietnam War

Production history
- Designed: 1962
- Manufacturer: FMC Corp
- Produced: 1964
- No. built: ~350

Specifications
- Mass: 23,330 lbs (10,580 kg)
- Length: 4.863 metres (15 ft 11.5 in)
- Width: 2.686 metres (8 ft 9.7 in)
- Height: 2.5 metres (8 ft 2 in)
- Crew: 2
- Armor: aluminum 12–38 millimetres (0.47–1.50 in)
- Main armament: M10-8 flame gun
- Secondary armament: coaxial 7.62 mm caliber M73 machine gun
- Engine: Chrysler 75M; 8 cylinder, 4 cycle, vee gasoline 215 hp (160 kW) at 4,000 rpm
- Power/weight: 22.36 hp/tonne
- Transmission: Allison TX-200-2A
- Suspension: torsion bar, 5 road wheels
- Fuel capacity: 80 gallons (300 litres)
- Operational range: 480 km (300 mi)
- Maximum speed: 67.6 km/h (42.0 mph), 5.8 km/h (3.6 mph) swimming

The M132 armored flamethrower (nicknamed "Zippo") was a United States built flamethrower armed variant of the M113 and M113A1 armored personnel carriers developed in the early 1960s. Approximately 350 were accepted into service.

== History ==
The first prototype of the vehicle was produced in August 1962 when a flamethrower was mounted on a M113. This prototype was only used in combat situations four times that year.

In December 1964, the First Armored Cavalry was sent two M132 flamethrower armored vehicles. Based on combat experiences with the vehicle the Army Concept Team advised that four M132s and two M113s be shipped to each regiment.

Standard operating procedure was to use the 7.62mm coaxial machine-gun to suppress the target until the M132 could be maneuvered into the flamethrower range. Sometimes a “wet burst” of unignited fuel would be sprayed into the target first, only to be ignited by a second “flaming burst.” This was found to do more damage to the target.

== Description ==
The vehicle was based on an M113. The driver sits in the front left of the hull. The gunner sits in a small cupola in the center of the hull which mounts an M10-8 flame gun with a coaxial 7.62 mm caliber M73 machine gun. The weapons could be traversed though 360 degrees and elevated to +55 degrees and depressed to −15 degree. The passenger compartment was removed, and replaced with an M10 fuel and pressure unit and four spherical 50 gallon fuel tanks.

The 200 gallon fuel capacity enabled it to fire for up to 32 seconds, and the pressure unit enabled it to reach targets at a range of 170 meters (186 yards).

== See also ==
- Flamethrowers based on T-54/T-55
- List of flamethrowers
