= ROKS Flamethrowers =

Soviet flamethrowers

ROKS-2 flamethrower
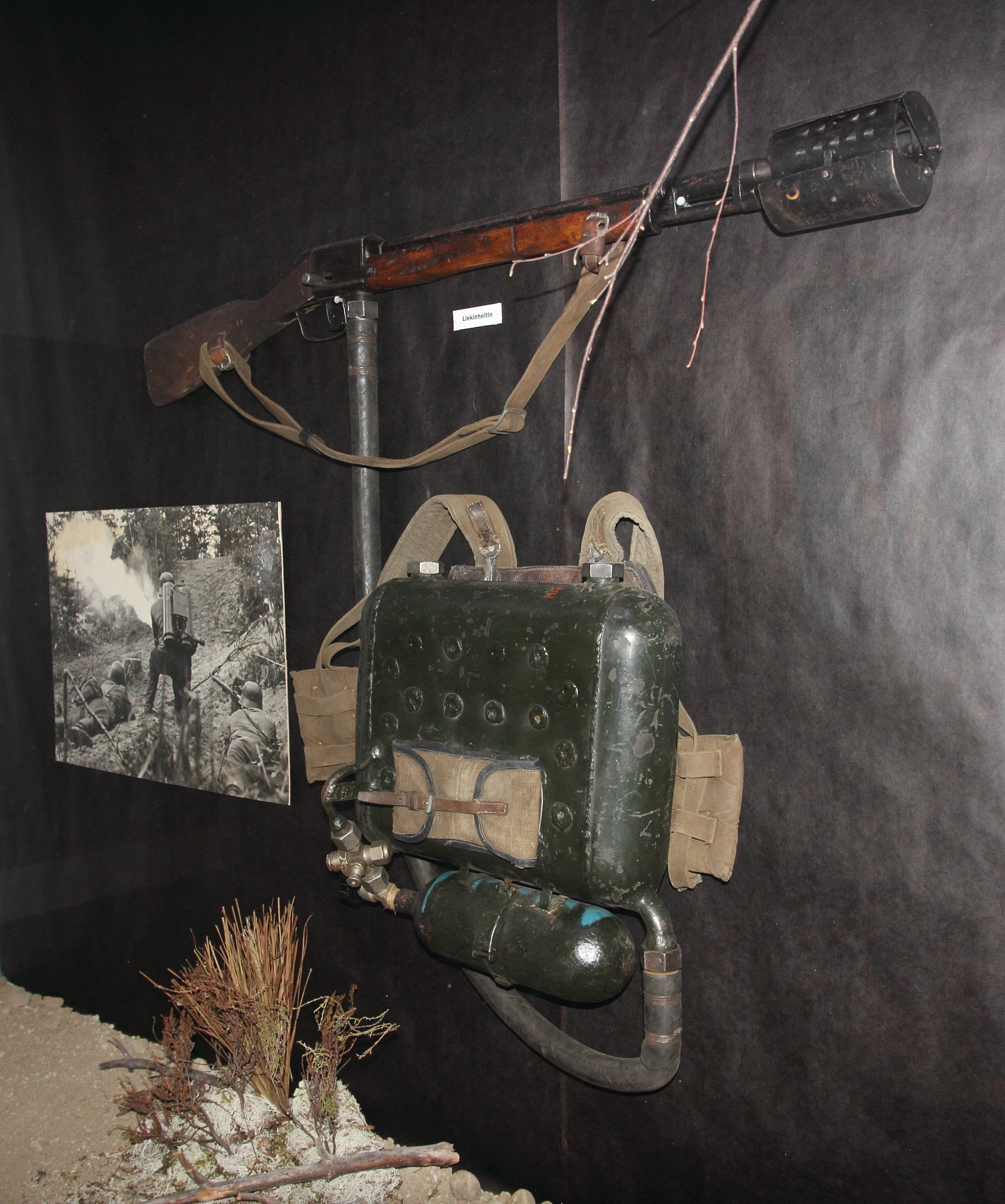
- A captured ROKS-2 flamethrower at the Mikkeli Infantry museum, Finland (2011)
- Type: Flamethrower
- Place of origin: Soviet Union

Service history
- In service: 1935−1945 (USSR)
- Used by: Soviet Union
- Wars: Second World War, Vietnam War

Production history
- Manufacturer: Different manufacturers
- Produced: 1935-1941

Specifications
- Mass: 22.7 kg (50.0 lb)
- Crew: 1
- Effective firing range: 25 m (27 yd)
- Maximum firing range: 45 m (49 yd)
- Feed system: 9 L (2.4 US gal) fuel tank 1 nitrogen tank (propellant)
- Sights: None

The ROKS-2 and ROKS-3 (Shortened from Russian, Rantseviy Ognemyot Kluyeva-Sergeyeva; Ранцевый Огнемёт Клюева — Сергеева; "Kluyev-Sergeyev backpack flamethrower") were man-portable flamethrowers used by the USSR in the Second World War.

== ROKS-2 ==
The ROKS-2 was designed not to draw attention, so the fuel and gas tanks were concealed under a sheet-metal outer casting resembling a knapsack; the flame projector was designed to resemble a standard Mosin–Nagant rifle. Operators of flamethrowers during The Great War were immediately targeted, so by camouflaging it to look like a rifle the ROKS-2 protected the operator from being specifically targeted by the enemy.

ROKS-2 had two vertical fuel tanks connected by pipe to a horizontal pressurized nitrogen tank. The nitrogen tank was pressurized at approximately 113 bars (11,300 kPa) and used a propellant for the fuel. The flame shots were ignited by firing specially modified 7.62×25mm Tokarev cartridges.

The ROKS-2 was used, amongst other engagements, during the close-range fighting during the first days of the Battle of Kursk in 1943.

The Finnish designation for captured ROKS-2 units was liekinheitin M/41-r. Captured Soviet flamethrowers saw some use by Finnish forces during the Continuation War. They were operated by two-man teams of combat engineers. They were well regarded by the Finns, although flamethrowers of all kinds saw little use by Finnish forces.

== ROKS-3 ==
During the German invasion of the Soviet Union in 1941, production in factories struggled to keep up with the demand for weapons, including production of the ROKS-2. This led to the creation of the ROKS-3. The ROKS-3 was a simplified model designed to be easier to manufacture. It did away with the disguise for the backpack, though it retained the flame projector designed to resemble a rifle. Both models carried around 9 litres (2.4 US gal) of fuel. The fuel was propelled by nitrogen gas pressurized at 115 bars (11,500 kPa) and, under ideal circumstances, had a maximum range of around 45 metres (49 yd).

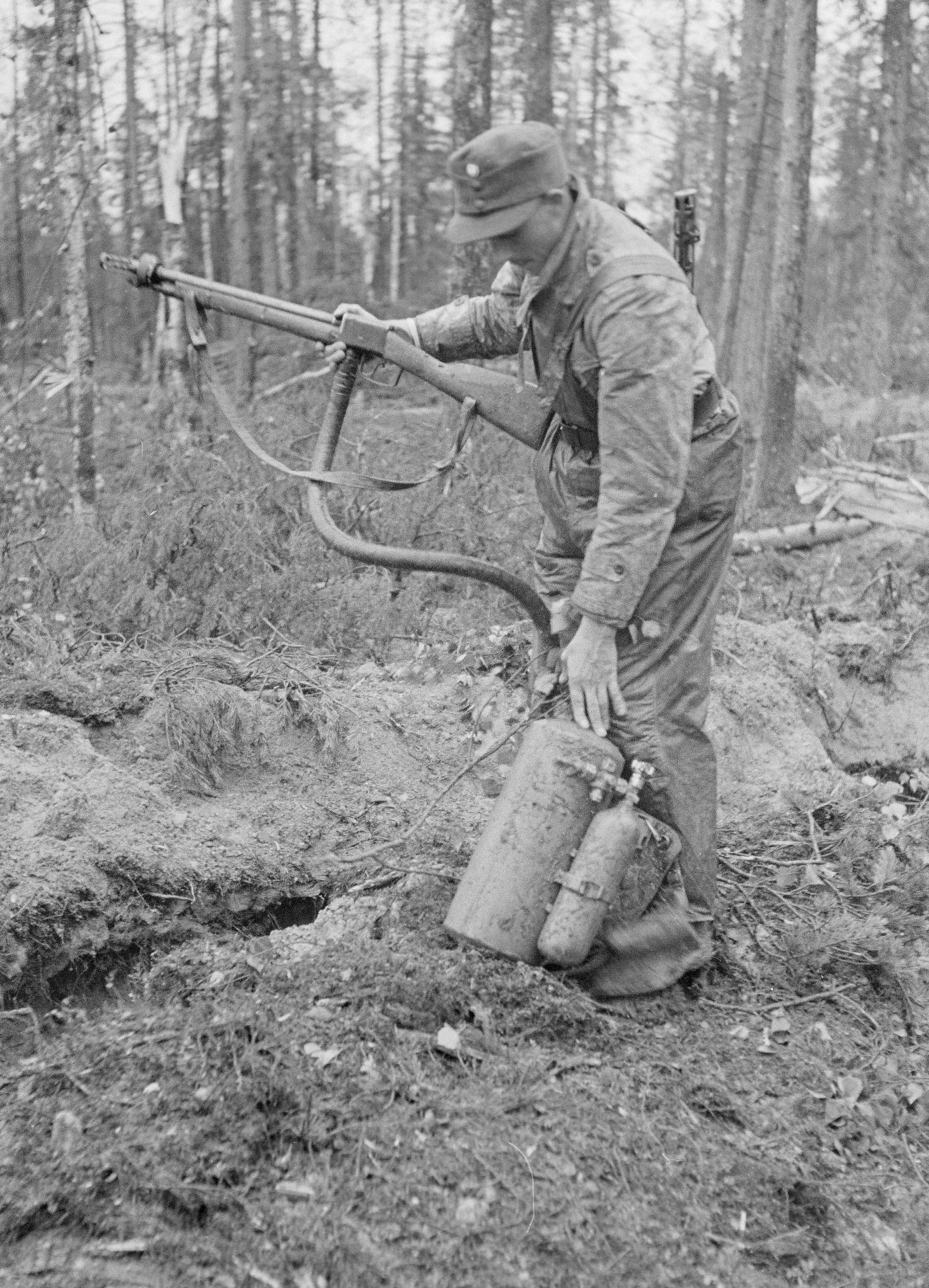
A Finnish soldier with a captured ROKS-3 flamethrower, June 1943

Some ROKS-3 units were supplied to North Korea, Czechoslovakia, Kingdom of Yemen (via Czechoslovakia), and North Vietnam.

== Users ==
- Czechoslovakia
- Finland − Captured ROKS-2 and ROKS-3
- North Korea
- Soviet Union
- Vietnam − ROKS-3 supplied by the USSR
- Yemen − 50 delivered in 1957, former Czechoslovak stock

== See also ==
- List of flamethrowers
- List of Russian weaponry

== Bibliography ==
- Embassy of Vietnam, United States (20 April 1971). "The Soviet Role in North Viet-Nam's Offensive". Vietnam Bulletin. VII (7). Embassy of Viet-Nam.: 17−23.
- Green, Michael (2022). Red Army Weapons of the Second World War. Pen and Sword Military. ISBN 978-1-3990-9539-6.
- Smisek, Martin (2023). Czechoslovak Arms Exports to the Middle East: Volume 4 - Iran, Iraq, Yemen Arab Republic and the People's Democratic Republic of Yemen 1948-1989. Helion and Company. ISBN 978-1-80451-524-2.
