= Flammenwerfer M.16. =

Flammenwerfer M16
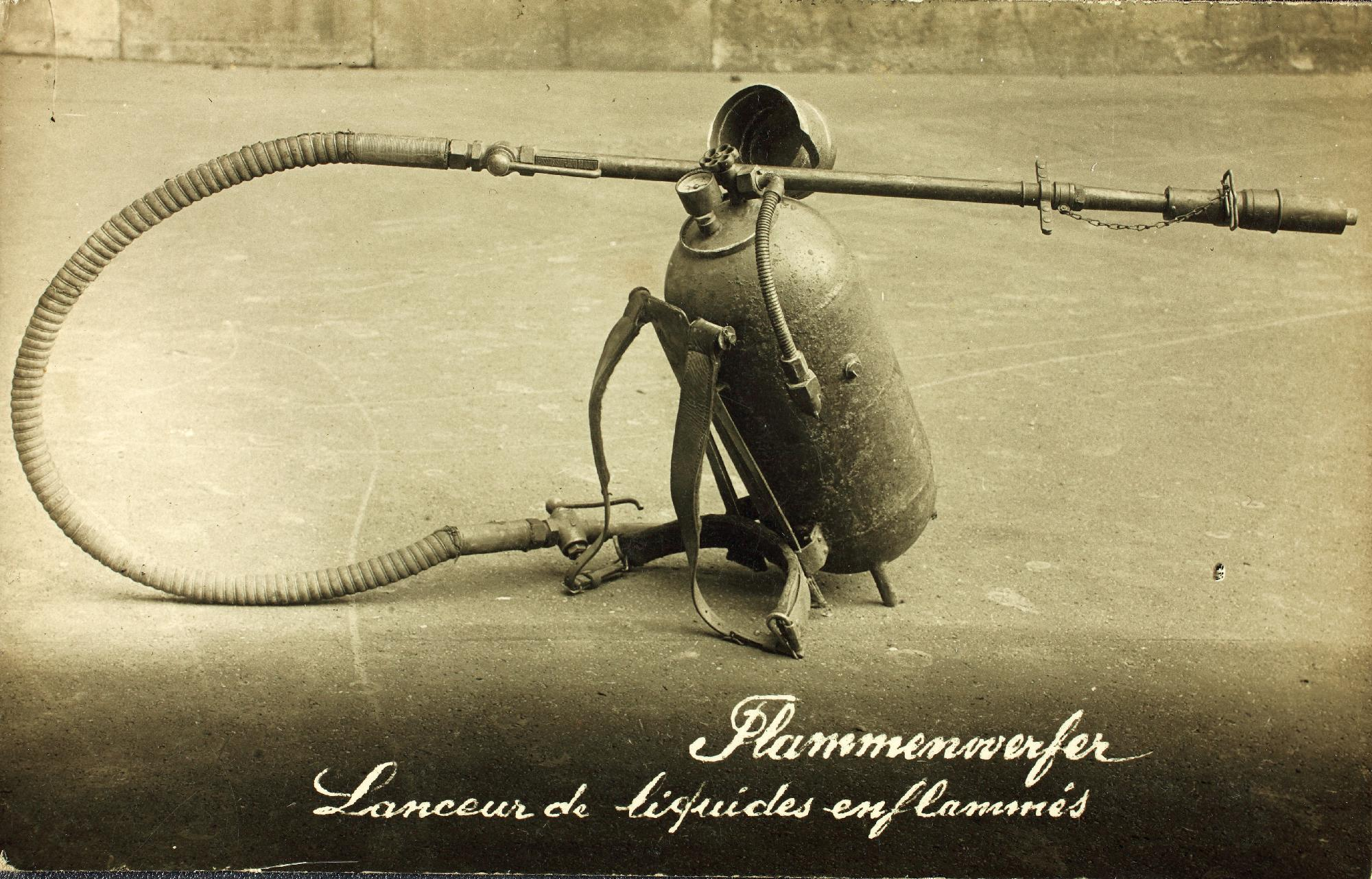
- Type: Flamethrower
- Place of origin: German Empire

Service history
- Used by: German Empire, Freikorps
- Wars: World War I

Specifications
- Crew: 2
- Sights: None

The Flammenwerfer M.16. was a German man-portable backpack flamethrower that was used in World War I in trench warfare by the Germans. It was the first flamethrower ever used in combat, in 1916 at Verdun by the Germans. It was also used in 1918 in the battle of Argonne Forest in France against Allied forces by Germans, as featured in the 2001 film The Lost Battalion where the main character fights German, although an account in a 1917 issue of The Living Age suggests eyewitness accounts of it being used at the Battle of the Somme in 1916 by Germans.

== Development ==
As the industrial revolution grew across all of Europe the desire for more powerful and effective weapons continued to grow. In 1901 Germany, a private citizen named Richard Fiedler designed and patented the first modern design of a flamethrower. In the same year the Imperial German army took notice and funded his project. Fiedler would continue to work and design several flamethrowers, and presented them to the German army in 1905. After receiving some feed back, he delivered two versions of the Flammenwerfer for army use. Finally in 1911 the German army accepted his designs into service. About the same time another man named Bernhard Reddemann began his own development of the flamethrower. He was an officer in the German pioneer battalion in the reserves, as well as a firefighter in the civilian world. As his curiosity with the use of kerosene as a weapon of war, he started to blend the pumping power of a hose for fire fighting, with the effectiveness of fire as a defensive weapon. As the First World War started he went back to active duty . By the second year of the war he was commanding a flamethrower pioneer battalion. Thanks to his command and use a whole regiment was installed. Although Fiedler was the real inventor of the flamethrower, it was Reddemann who used it to great success on the battlefield.

== Instructional use ==
The Flammenwerfer M.16 was a two-man operated system, with one man wearing a metal tank full of fuel, and the other man holding the nozzle to aim towards the desire target. As the fuel hit the open fire in front of the nozzle, spraying flames about 20-30 yards with a continuous spray for 20–40 seconds. Although very portable it was not able to be carried by one person.

== World War I ==
At the outbreak of the Great War the German army started to look for towards the Flammenwerfer as a means to break the dead lock facing the western front. During the battle of Verdun in 1916 where German pioneers and shock troopers used it to deadly effect. They would be the front of the attack, clearing trenches and piercing soft points in enemy lines, allowing for more troops to enter. An unnamed French officer witnessed the German flamethrowers in action saying that "they were so terrifying that not even words could describe it" as they assaulted many men fell, although they still completed their mission. The flamethrower pioneers were successful in about 80% of their missions, turning the tide of battle and instilling fear into their enemies hearts.

== Inter-war use ==
After the Treaty of Versailles, Germany became the hot bed for chaos and communist revolutionaries. During this time, the German army as well as the Freikorps, a right wing militia, used the Flammenwerfer to disperse crowds.

== See also ==
- List of flamethrowers

== Sources ==
- Johnson, Richard (14 January 2023). "Flammenwerfer — World War I German Flamethrowers". The Armory Life. Springfield Armory.
- Fratus, Matt (5 April 2022). "A Brief and Violent History of the Modern Flamethrower". Coffee or Die magazine. Black Rifle Coffee.
