= Handflammpatrone =

German single-shot incendiary weapon

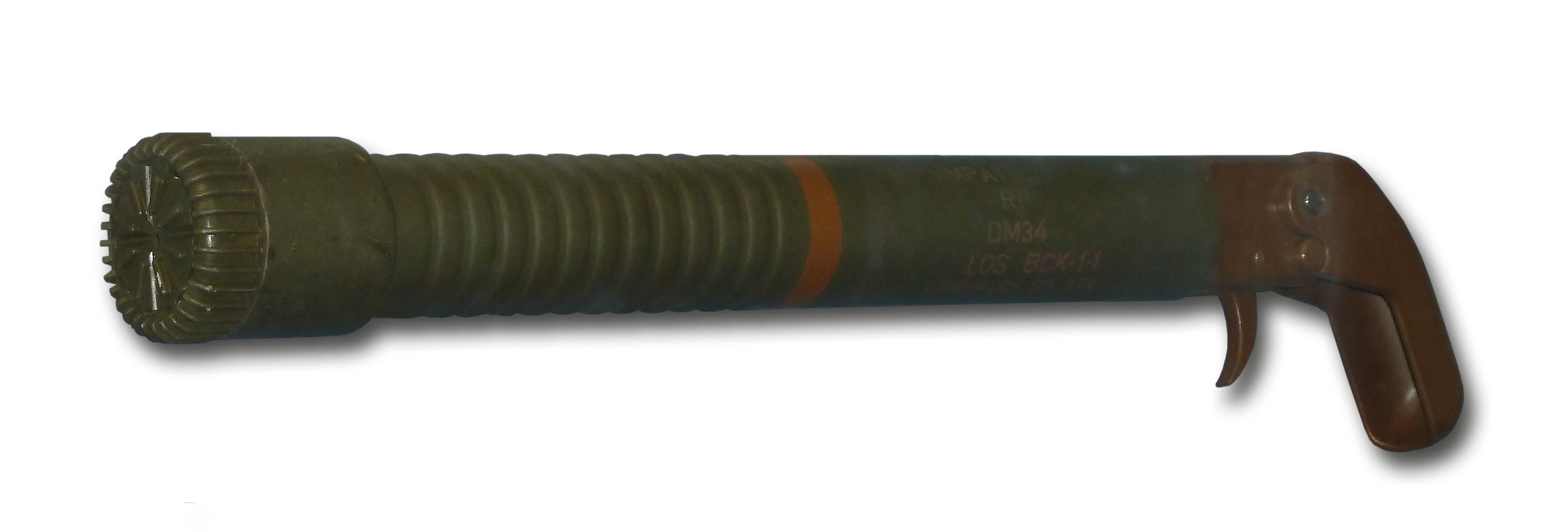
The Handflammpatrone DM 34

The Handflammpatrone DM34 Cartridge Launcher model HAFLA-35L ("hand-held flame-cartridge") was a single-shot, disposable incendiary weapon issued to the German Armed Forces from 1976 to 2001. Manufactured by Buck KG. An earlier version HAFLA-35 had been in service from 1965. The weapon consisted of three compressed sections of incendiary red phosphorus contained in a projectile with a time fuse and bursting/scattering charge. The cartridge was held in an aluminium launch tube, externally reinforced with pasteboard. A pivoting handgrip with safety button, a primer and initial propelling charge are at one end of this tube, the other end with the cartridge being sealed with a plastic cover, making a watertight unit. The firing mechanism is locked until the safety button gets pressed and the handle unfolded, an act that exposes the trigger and releases a safety mechanism. When the trigger is pulled, the primer ignites the initial propelling charge, setting the red phosphorus round in motion. Immediately a second propelling charge at the back of the cartridge accelerates the round out of the tube and also initiates a delay fuse. The round would either shatter on hard contact by kinetic energy alone after travelling at least 8 metres, spreading the incendiary content over a 5 to 8 metre area (in this case the scattering charge does not explode), or if fired into the air over enemy dispositions, the cartridge would be burst by a scattering charge after 1.3 seconds of flight (this represents forward travel of 70–80 m), the scattering charge being ignited by the delay fuse. The heat of the bursting charge and friction through the air changes the red phosphorus to white phosphorus which then self-ignites as it spreads. When burst in flight, the incendiary material spreads across an area approximately 10 m wide and 15 m long and burns at 1,300 °C. The incendiary charge will burn for two minutes.

Also produced by PRB in Belgium as the CALID NR 179 red phosphorus.

There was a practice version of the HAFLA . It had the same dimensions and weight as the HAFLA-35L but had an inert filling of lime and a smoke marker to indicate the point of impact.

- Weight: 625 g
- Calibre: 35 mm
- Range: 8–90 meters
- Length: 445 mm
- Incendiary composition red phosphorus
- Weight of composition:300 g
- packing: 3 HAFLAs per pouch: 51 HAFLAs per crate.

== See also ==
- Einstossflammenwerfer 46
