= Lanciafiamme Mod. 41 d'assalto =

Italian flamethrower used during World War II

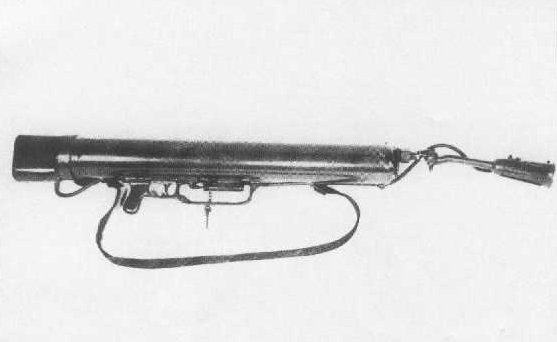
- Type: Flamethrower
- Place of origin: Italy

Service history
- In service: 1941–1998
- Used by: Royal Italian Army; National Republican Army; Italian Army
- Wars: World War II; Italian Civil War

Production history
- Designed: 1941
- Manufacturer: Servizio Chimico Militare
- No. built: 1,500

Specifications
- Effective firing range: 20–25 meters (66–82 ft)

The Lanciafiamme Mod. 41 d'assalto was a flamethrower used by the Royal Italian Army during World War II. The Mod. 41 was meant to be an extremely light and compact flamethrower to equip paratroopers and Assault Engineers, The flamethrower remained in use after the war until 1998.

The weapon was developed during 1941 in response to the need of a portable flamethrower that could be used for close urban combat. The result was a man portable flamethrower which consisted of the widely used backpack fuel tank and a nozzle assembly that connects all the way to a hose that would then allow the user of the weapon to fire towards the enemy. The weapon had an effective range of roughly 20–25 meters (66–82 ft) and was used extensively during the North African campaign against the Allies. The weapon was primarily used to clear out bunkers, trenches and fortifications. The weapon continued its service after the Second World War until it was completely phased out by 1998 due to its obsolete design.
