= F.R.A.S. (weapon) =

Incendiary agent

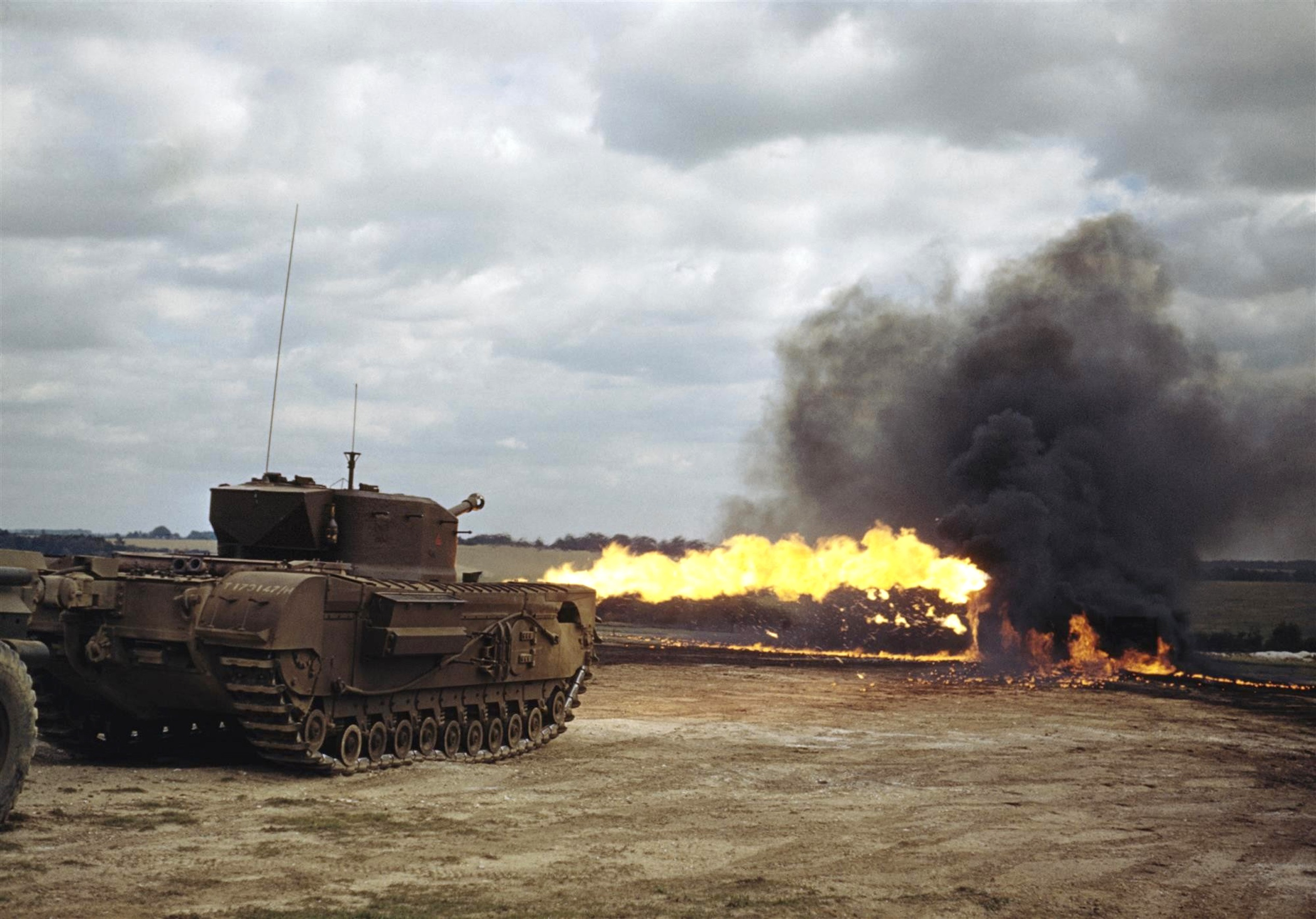
A Churchill Crocodile tank firing FRAS

Fuel Research Aluminium Stearate (FRAS), also known as "K fuel" and informally as "Dragon's Breath", is mixture of chemical substances, used as an incendiary agent by the United Kingdom during the Second World War.

It is hygroscopic fuel developed by the Fuel Research Station of the Department of Scientific and Industrial Research, at Greenwich . It is a generally inferior compound to the napalm thickener, exhibiting high thermal and aquatic instability, not reproducible in quantities specified by US CWS and does not form permanent gels.

In the conflict in Europe, it was the fuel of the M1A1 flamethrower. Delivered ready to use. It was used as fuel for individual flamethrowers, for the Churchill Crocodile flamethrower tank (standard fuel).

Its replacement was leaning towards an in-situ generated thickener, more applicable in the field, called Q-fuel - XQ during its development phase -.

== History ==
After the start of the Second World War, concerned with the development, research and technical mastery of incendiary mixtures, the Mixture Committee was formed in the second half of the year 1940 by the Director of Fuel Research, Dr. Frank Sturdy Sinnatt. (Note: replaced after his death in 1943 by Alfred Egerton) The development of material, such as a substitute for rubber, was started in January 1942, in several works, by several members of the committee.

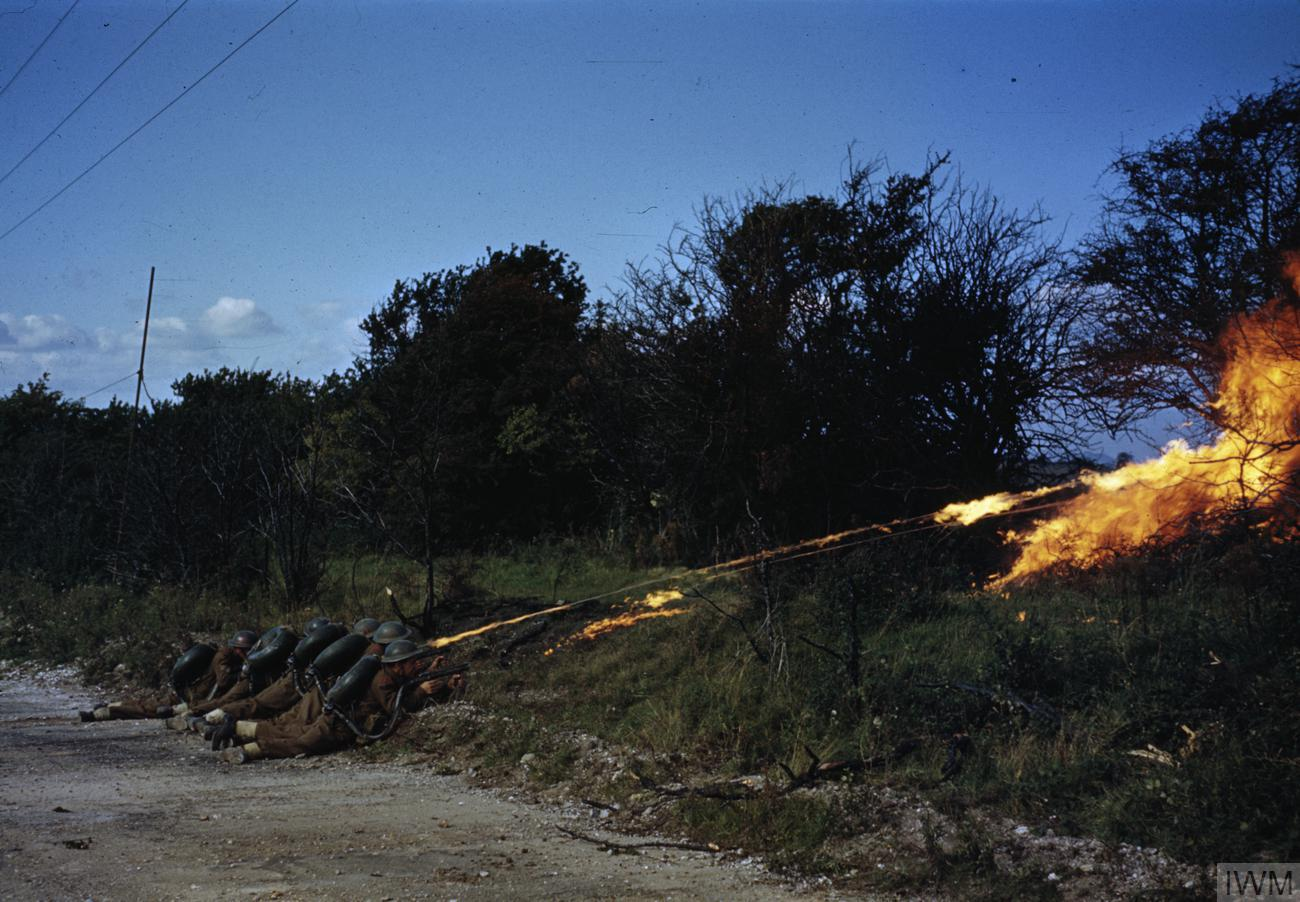
A narrow rod of FRAS from a portable flamethrower

In early investigative work, the standard component was rubber, being the constituent in several incendiary mixtures. Its anomalous viscosity being essential for flamethrower fuel. The use of this component deteriorated with the Japanese take over of Malaysia in February 1942.

The initial results of the development of the thickened fuel turned out to be unsatisfactory but an additive remedied the deficiencies of the gel. After this resolution, a special investigation into the manufacture of soaps was carried out, solving the problems of the thickener.

Work with FRAS gels was then carried out at the Fuel Research Station until fuel production was taken over by the Ministry of Supply. The Fuel Research Station continued to serve as an advisor on the industrial scale production and improvement of FRAS and its precursors, of which around 41 million litres were manufactured and used in the European theatre. The post-war surplus FRAS was decomposed to produce stearic acid, motor fuel and, to a lesser extent, xylenol.

It was adopted by the Canadian Army in 1942 and by the British War Office 1943. The Australian army leaned towards the adoption of the FRAS, however, due to the instability of the FRAS in the tropical climate, it was discarded.

The use of aluminum stearate as a flame fuel thickener, as well as the general technique of making FRAS, was already used by the Soviets earlier, and in a completely superior way. The Germans, under the direction of the firm Rheinpreussen, appear to have managed to overcome the disadvantages, although the supply of the agent has inhibited its large-scale use. It was one of the first candidates for replacing natural rubber, investigated by Louis F. Fieser's team. The inclusion of the thickener in the fuel was problematic and, therefore, it was discarded.

Aluminum distearates can be synthesized as high-activity gelling agents for fine fuels when coprecipitated under suitable conditions and/or with suitable additives. Loss of gelling efficiency is undesirable, both physically and chemically. Aluminum stearate is generally used as a stabilizing additive - acting to prevent sintering and in the extension of the induction point -, coprecipitated with high-activity aluminum soap-forming acids. Aluminum stearate is indicated for fuels with a high concentration of peptizers, which induce gelation.
