= Trench warfare in World War I =

Trench warfare in the First World War dominated the Western Front in particular from late autumn 1914 to spring 1918, but also, to varying degrees, on the Eastern Front, the Isonzo Front and the Gallipoli Peninsula. After the initial German advance under the Schlieffen Plan had been halted at the First Battle of the Marne and the subsequent Race to the sea ended without a strategic breakthrough, the front line became deadlocked along a stretch of around 700 kilometres between the Channel coast of northern France and the Swiss border. Trench warfare developed into a complex, deeply echeloned system. It comprised front-line trenches, communication and reserve trenches behind them, as well as extensive shelters, bunker complexes and barbed-wire entanglements. Machine guns and the massive use of artillery made infantry attacks extremely costly in terms of casualties.

To break the deadlock, the warring parties turned to innovative military methods and tactics, including the use of poison gas, infiltration troops and tanks. In addition to the direct effects of combat, the soldiers’ daily lives were characterised by extreme weather conditions, poor hygiene and disease. Constant artillery fire led to psychological trauma, which became known as ‘shell shock’. Major offensives resulted in hundreds of thousands of casualties without achieving any operational breakthroughs. The combination of the United States’ entry into the war, the material exhaustion of the Central Powers, and the Allies’ major offensive in the summer of 1918 brought the trench warfare to an end.

== Origins and Transition (1914) ==
After the Battle of the Marne the German OHL had realized that the Schlieffen Plan had failed. As a consequence both the Allies and the Germans had started their Race to the Sea to rout their opponent's flank. The race ended with the First Battle of Ypres with either side failing to rout their opponent. At the same time the French advance in Lorraine and Alsace were checked.Since there were no more flanks to bypass, the entire front, stretching from the North Sea to the Swiss border, had come to a standstill.

In the decades leading up to 1914, military technology had advanced in the area of firepower. The introduction of the machine gun and modern rapid-fire and heavy artillery increased range, accuracy, and lethality on the battlefield many times over. At the same time, there was a lack of the technology necessary to sustain dynamic attacks or push deep into enemy territory. The railroad existed for long-distance transport, but at the front lines themselves, resupply depended on horses and marches on foot. With every kilometer, an attacking army moved further away from its supply depots, leading to ever-longer transport routes. The defending side, on the other hand, could deploy troops to the points of breach much more quickly via its intact rail network in the rear than the attacker could advance on foot.

== Architecture ==
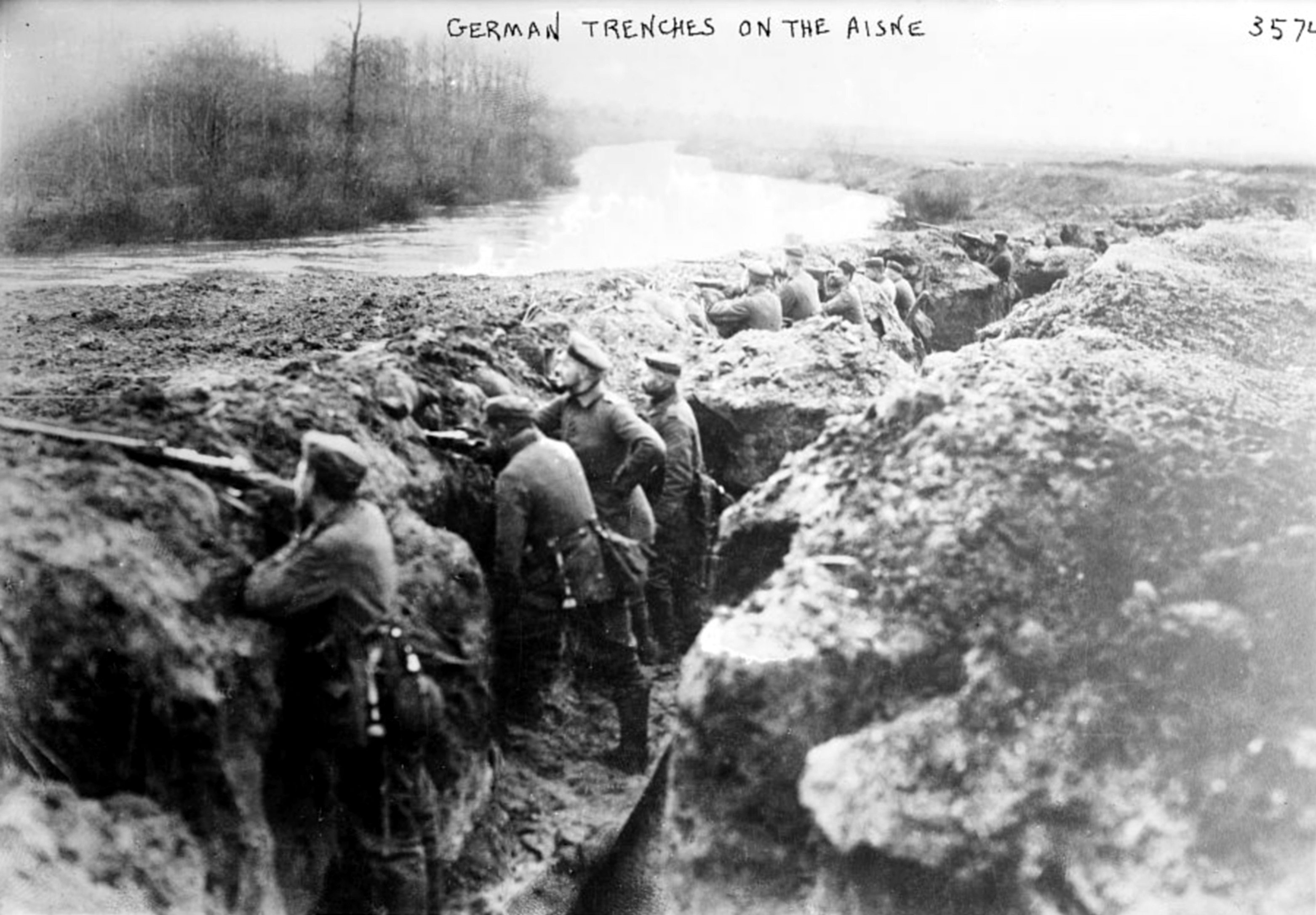
Early makeshift trench on the Aisne 1914

Idealized trench construction

=== Trenches ===
==== Western Front ====
Early trenches were simple shallow depressions resembling slit-trenches and fox-holes of World War II about 0.98 feet (30 cm) deep, to provide temporary cover for a lying shooter. By 1916 trench systems consisted of a series of three trenches running parallel to each other: the front trench, the support trench and the reserve trench. These trenches were built below or above ground as breastworks, or as a combination of trench and breastwork. A typical front line consisted of two trenches: the fire trench and the command trench. The fire trench was a continuous zigzag line traversed at intervals by earthen parapets, which protected against enfilade fire and shell blasts. They were about 9 feet (2.7 m) to 13 feet (4.0 m) thick and the length of trench or 'bay' between each one was 18 feet (5.5 m) to 30 feet (9.1 m).

Located some 20 yards ahead of the fire trench, a steady line of barbed wire, approximately 10 yards (9.1 m) wide and 3 feet (0.91 m) high, stretched across no-man's-land. Beyond this, an additional wire obstacle may have been erected, with its outer edge positioned 40 yards (37 m) or 50 yards (46 m) from the trench. A network of tunnels in the parapet of the fire trench and lanes through the barbed wire defences were used by soldiers to enter no-man's-land. Occasionally, a sap trench would extend into no-man's-land by 20 yards (18 m) or 30 yards (27 m), serving as an observation or advanced warning post.The barbed wire itself ran before the front line 2 yards (1.8 m) to 3 yards (2.7 m) deep, and the Germans also used razor wire.

A 1:1 scale replica of a trench

The command trench were running about 20 yards (18 m) behind and parallel to the fire trench. The two trenches met at regular intervals, enabling communication to be maintained along the entire front line. Within the command trench dug-outs provided shelter during artillery bombardment. Unlike the Allies, the German army used concrete for reinforcement from the very beginning of the trench war. This enabled the Germans to build particularly deep dugouts up to 40 feet (12 m). These shelters or Stollen were designed to withstand continuous shelling from guns of up to 200 mm calibre, and at selected spots hits from even heavier pieces.The standard depth was between 20 feet (6.1 m) and 25 feet (7.6 m) below ground level. The Stollen could consist of multiple exits, anti-gas curtains, drainage sumps and pumps, full cooking facilities and sometimes electricity generators for lighting. Tunnels connecting these dugouts featured reinforcements of corrugated iron encased in concrete.

To ensure orientation in the trenches, they were given names and often numbers. They also served a further psychological function. Names such as Augsburger-Graben, Piccadilly Circus and Tranchée de Champagne evoked a sense of security and home amongst the soldiers. Names such as Kronprinz-Graben, Joffre Farm or Victoria Trench were motivated by patriotism. Others, such as Gangrene Alley, Tranchée de l’Enfer or Hopeless Street, reflected the soldiers’ cynicism.

Finally, machine guns were positioned in concealed strongpoints along the front line. All the lines had communication trenches connecting them at fixed intervals. Telephone cables, reliefs, rations and supplies of ammunition ran along these trenches to the battalion and battery headquarters. These communication trenches were also constructed in zigzag pattern. At right angles to, and on either side the communication trenches, featured slit trenches, providing protection during bombardments. Some 70 yards (64 m) to 100 yards (91 m) behind the command trench was the support trench with dug-outs, which accommodated support troops for the front line garrison.

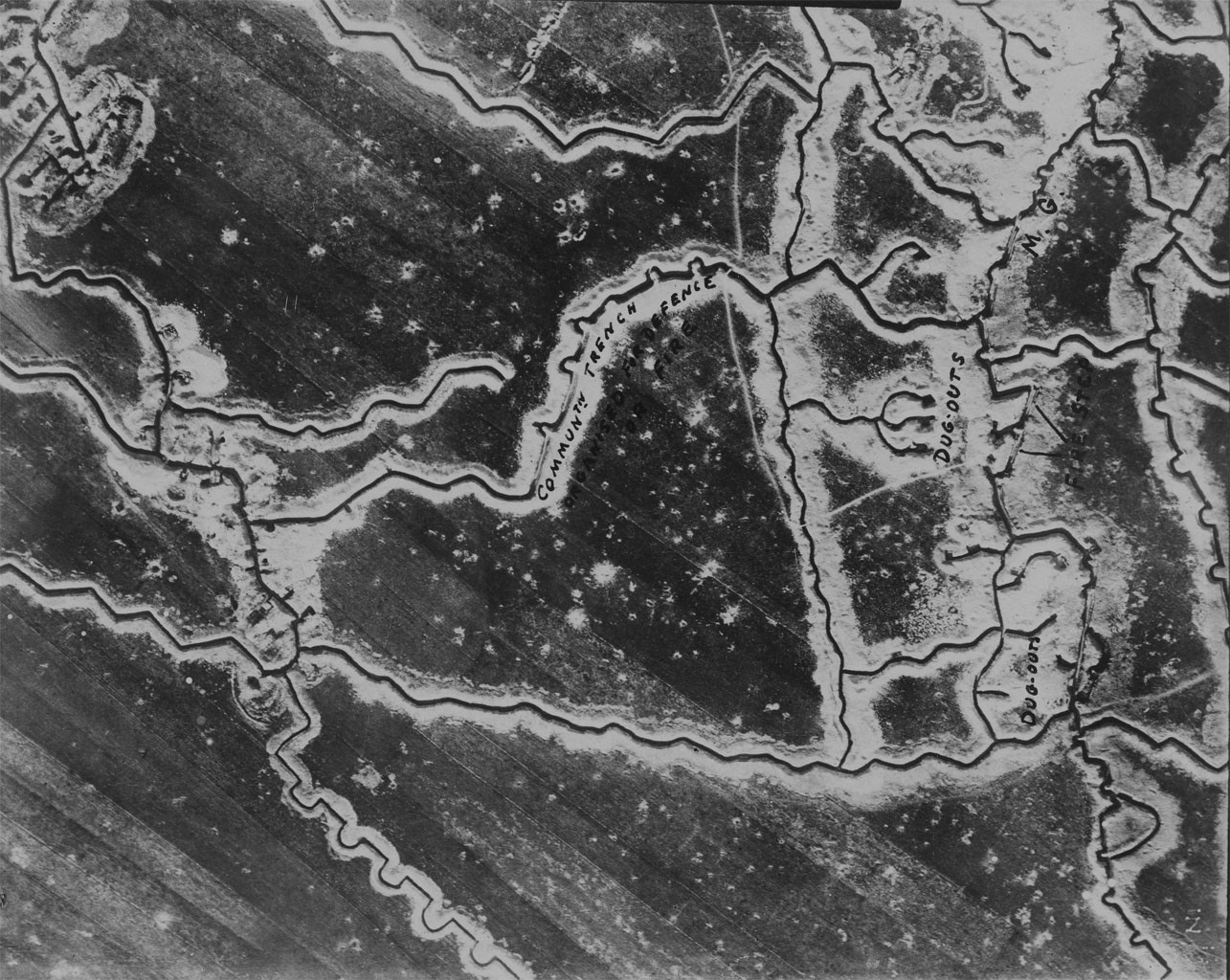
Aerial view of a system of trenches, with an entanglement of connecting trenches and redoubts.

The French trench system differed somewhat from those of the British and Germans. There were only two lines: the front line and the support line. The French front line consisted of segments, with fully garrisoned and fortified trenches interspersed with trenches garrisoned only by sentries. This enabled the former to defend the latter with enfilade fire. The French support trench was also fully garrisoned and contained deep dug-outs to protect against shelling. Their quick-firing guns compensated for the lack of a reserve line. In case of a raid, for example, to prevent an incursion into the command trench, there were simple barbed-wire barriers positioned above the trench that could be lowered. When a position was deliberately abandoned, such as during the German retreat to the Siegfried Line in 1917, trenches and shelters were rigged with booby traps.

==== Eastern Front ====
Compared to those on the Western Front, the trenches on the Eastern Front were more difficult to construct; there was a shortage of labor, building materials were harder to obtain, and the roads and rail lines were either too few or too overloaded to allow for the rapid transport of supplies. It was not until 1916 that a trench system of roughly similar scale was established.The Austro-Hungarian front line consisted of the three foremost trenches, which formed a strip about one kilometer deep. Within this strip were massive shelters designed to withstand even the heaviest artillery fire. The dugouts were reinforced with concrete; the officers’ quarters even had windows. There were concrete machine-gun emplacements designed to provide enfilade fire. In front of the trenches there were several rows of uncut wire often electrified and further reinforced by landmines. The Russian trenches were rather primitive, with gun positions that were too exposed and dugouts that were poorly constructed from weak and even rotten wood. The trenches were not deep enough to withstand bombardment, nor long enough for defence in depth. There were too many troops on the front line, making them vulnerable to artillery, and too few reserves in the rear for counterattacks.

==== Dardanelles ====
overcrowded Anzac trench at Gallipoli

At the Dardanelles, troops behind the line (and, in the early stages, those in the trenches as well) were also responsible for sapping, tunnelling and digging in order to secure and extend their positions. Everyone, except for the men occupying the trenches, were tasked with constructing roads along the hillsides behind their positions and transporting all the supply to the trenches. This constant task never stopped until the Evacuation. The front and support trenches were typically manned by different companies of the battalions holding the various sectors. The reserve companies were employed as carrying or digging parties during the day and slept at night close behind the support lines. A frequent occurrence at night was the movement of troops in "rest" to positions behind important posts. As a result, the rear trenches were overcrowded, and messengers hardly could find their way without tripping over the sleeping bodies.

The actual system of manning the line, was garrisoned more heavily at night than by day. During the early months, Anzac troops, refrained from using flares, letting the enemy illuminate No-Man's Land. This was changed when they realized it allowed Turkish patrols to move freely. Consequently, sentries were ordered to engage in intermittent sniping fire during the dark hours. As in France, each bay of the front line was manned only by a small proportion of the troops, usually a sentry (or a sniper and his observer) during the day, and two sentries at night. At dawn, when an attack was most probable, the entire front-line was occupied.Trenches featured the same components as in the Western Front with loop-holes, periscopes, sniperscopes and barbed-wire. Trenches were constructed in the same way as those in France with the frontline firing trenches dug in zigzags and smaller trenches connecting each line. Due to the lack of space no man´s land was just between 10 and 300 yards wide.

=== High Mountains ===
Despite the terrain the trenches in the Alps were actually zigzagged, featured communication trenches and dugouts; some even had concrete walls.Natural grottoes or caverns blasted 10 to 15 feet deep into the rock were used as protection against heavy artillery fire. The construction of these rock caverns required enormous quantities of explosives, building materials and labour from engineering units and infantry. Many frontline positions therefore consisted merely of trenches hewn into the rock, reinforced with sandbags, barbed wire and Spanish Riders.After the Italian defeat at Caporetto the British took over the Italian defenses at Piave. Here they constructed a rudimentary defence in depth based on the existing trenches already built.Supplying ammunition and food, as well as transporting equipment, posed a logistical problem. Where there were no cable cars, everything had to be carried on foot or by pack animals. Avalanches, altitude sickness and temperatures as low as -30° Celsius placed a massive strain on the soldiers.

=== No man's land ===
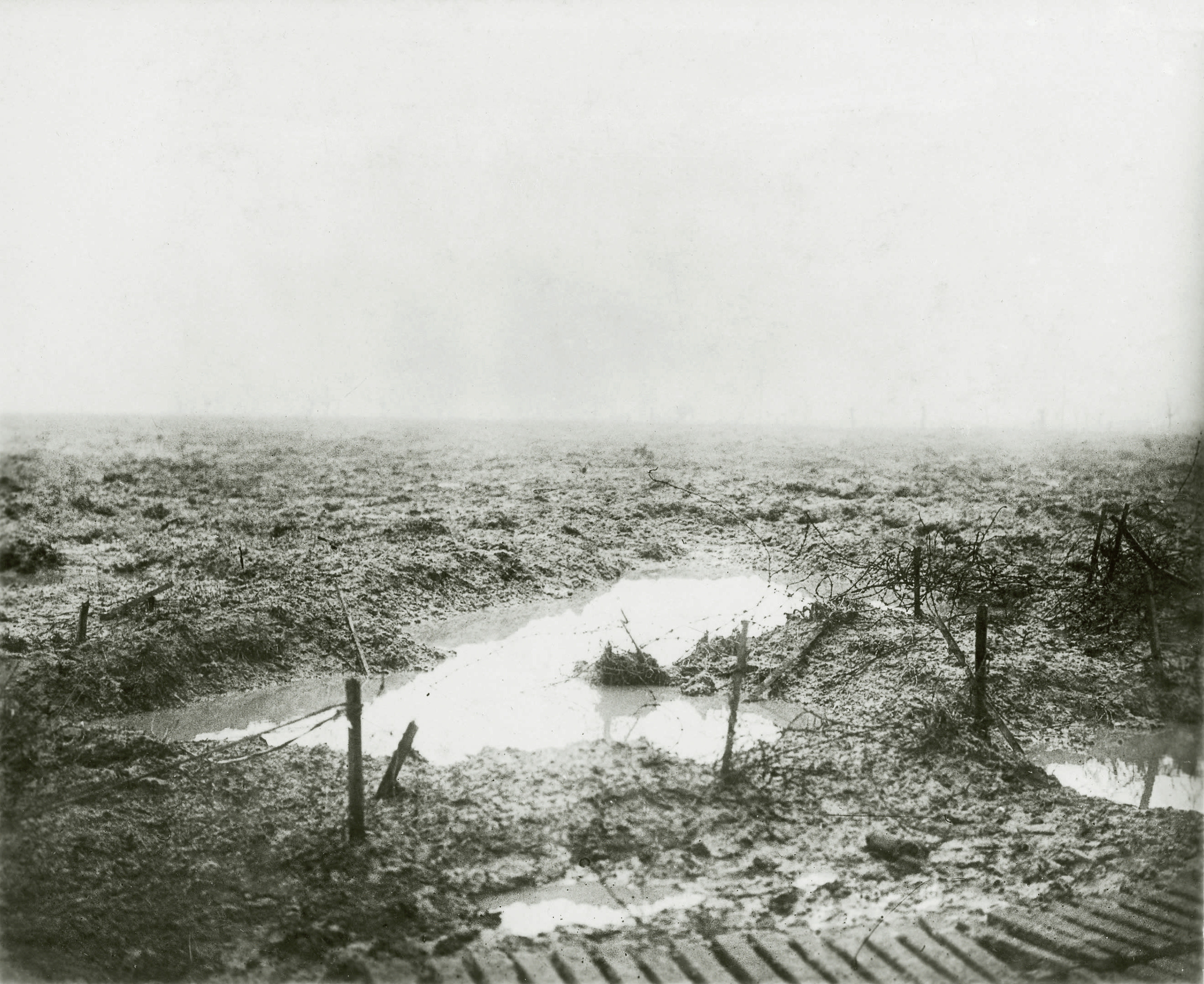
No man´s land at the Third Battle of Ypres. In front barbed wire and a water filled crater.

The width of no man's land varied from sector to sector. While the average was between 200 to 300 yards, it could reach from seven to five hundred yards. Controlling the no man's land was of high importance. By asserting dominance over the enemy, it was possible to maintain morale by taking the battle to the enemy rather than passively waiting for him to make the first move and then reacting to it. No-man´s land was covered with craters, often filled by dead bodies, earth churned up by the impact of the artillery, barbed wire, and other obstacles make advancing very difficult. While in 1914 no man’s land still referred specifically to the region between the entrenched armies, this definition was no longer valid by the end of 1915. By the end of 1916, the concept of no man’s land had diverged from the idea of a contested stretch of land between the front lines of entrenched enemies. The entire notion of which army owned which land changed because the concept of defence had evolved.

== Tactical and Technological Evolution ==
=== Defence ===
Battle of Albert, 1916. The steps leading down to a huge German underground shelter at Bernafay Wood, near Montauban, captured by the 9th Division. The picture gives a good idea of the size and depth of many German dugouts on the Somme.

Following the costly battles of the Somme and Verdun, the OHL abandoned its doctrine of defending every inch of trench at all costs. Instead, the principle of elasticity and defence-in-depth had been developed. The new doctrine, summarised in the manual Grundsätze für die Führung in der Abwehrschlacht im Stellungskrieg (Basic Principles for the Conduct of the Defence Battle in Position Warfare), issued on 1 December 1916, envisaged: If the lines were too difficult to hold, a retreat should be ordered. In the event of sustained shelling indicating a large-scale enemy attack, outposts were to leave the first trench and withdraw to decentralised shell holes. These were arranged in a checkerboard pattern in order to make them more difficult for the enemy barrage to hit. These shell craters were provisionally reinforced with support frames or connected to one another by short tunnels.

Should the enemy take the trenches, counter-attack divisions (Eingreifdivisionen), located just behind the front line, were to advance and recapture them. A second line had to be built behind a lightly held forward zone to prevent a coordinated artillery attack on both lines. Between the two positions, the distance should be between 4 and 10 kilometres. Dugouts, heavy concrete pillboxes and other obstacles that could withstand artillery fire were to be placed between the first and second lines. The mainstay of defence was no longer the rifle of the individual soldier, but the machine gun.While only a few machine guns were posted in the first trench, most of them were found in the second line, some 2,000 metres behind the first.

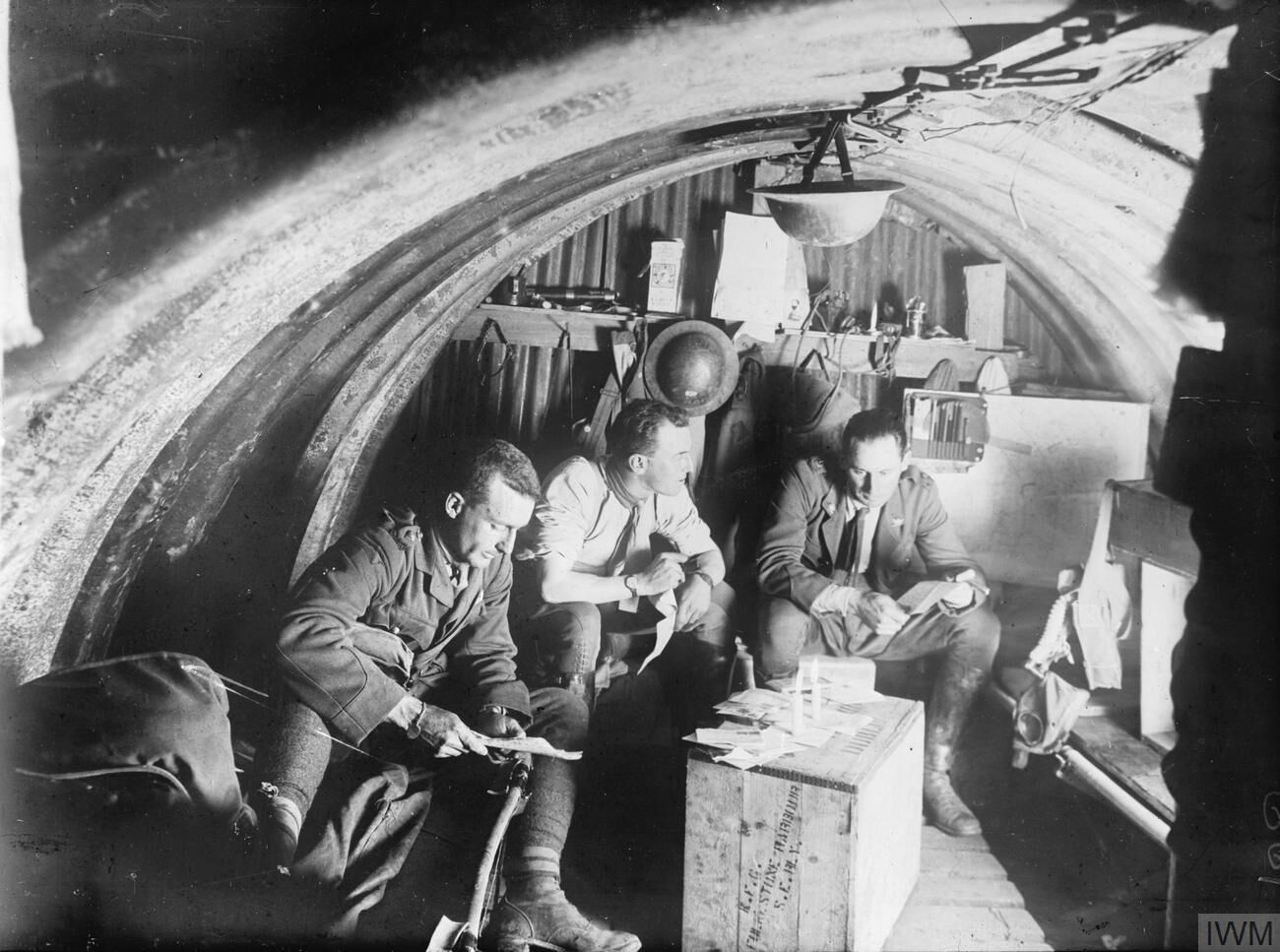
Inside a concrete reinforced dugout.

By the end of 1917 the Allies had adopted the German system. The new defence envisioned a Forward Zone, Battle Zone and a Rear Zone. While the French and German forward zones were only thinly held to just delay or dislocate attacks, the British Forward Zone was to be sufficiently garrisoned and strengthened... to compel the enemy to employ strong forces for its capture. Some two or three miles behind the Forward Zone was the Battle Zone some 2,000-3,000 yards deep. Four to eight miles behind the Battle Zone was the Rear Zone. Whereas the French and the Germans had positioned two-thirds of all troops in the Rear zone, the British placed only a third there. When in 21 March 1918 the German offensive was launched it became apparent that the Allies’ defence in depth had proved a failure without the concrete fortifications and barbed-wire entanglements employed by the Germans.

To overcome the German elastic defense 4th army commander general Henry Rawlinson had developed the bite and hold tactic. These new tactics envisioned massed artillery barrages that both destroyed and suppressed the German defences, with infantry afterwards occupying only the first line. The German counter-attack divisions would then meet well rested troops. It was not until the Third Battle of Ypres that bite and hold was considered an alternative to breakthrough.

=== Offensive ===
==== Chemical warfare ====
Having neither enough men nor ammunition to overcome the stalemate, the German OHL relied to the idea of using gas for cleaning the enemy trenches.The use of gas was advocated by the director of the Kaiser-Wilhelm-Institute for Physical Chemistry Fritz Haber. Following the first use on the Western front at the Second Battle of Ypres, the Allies begun also using gas.The first gas masks were only makeshift respirators consisting of cloth soaked in gas-neutralizing agents, such as a glycerine compound of sodium hyposulphite and fixed alkaline hydrate. With the development of more deadlier gases such as phosgene or mustard gas more effective respirators were introduced. These helmets or masks would cover the whole face and were either made from rubber or of muslin fabric soaked in gas absorbing chemicals.

==== Mine warfare ====
In order to destroy or disrupt enemy's trench lines specialist tunnelling units, often comprising former miners, would dig tunnels under no man's land and beneath the enemy's trenches. The tunnels would then be filled with explosives and detonated, creating a large crater and thus collapsing the enemy trenches. To neutralise enemy tunnels, miners dug a counter-tunnel under the enemy's tunnel and detonating explosives to create a camouflet and destroy it. If two tunnels encountered each other, fighting could break out.

==== Tanks ====
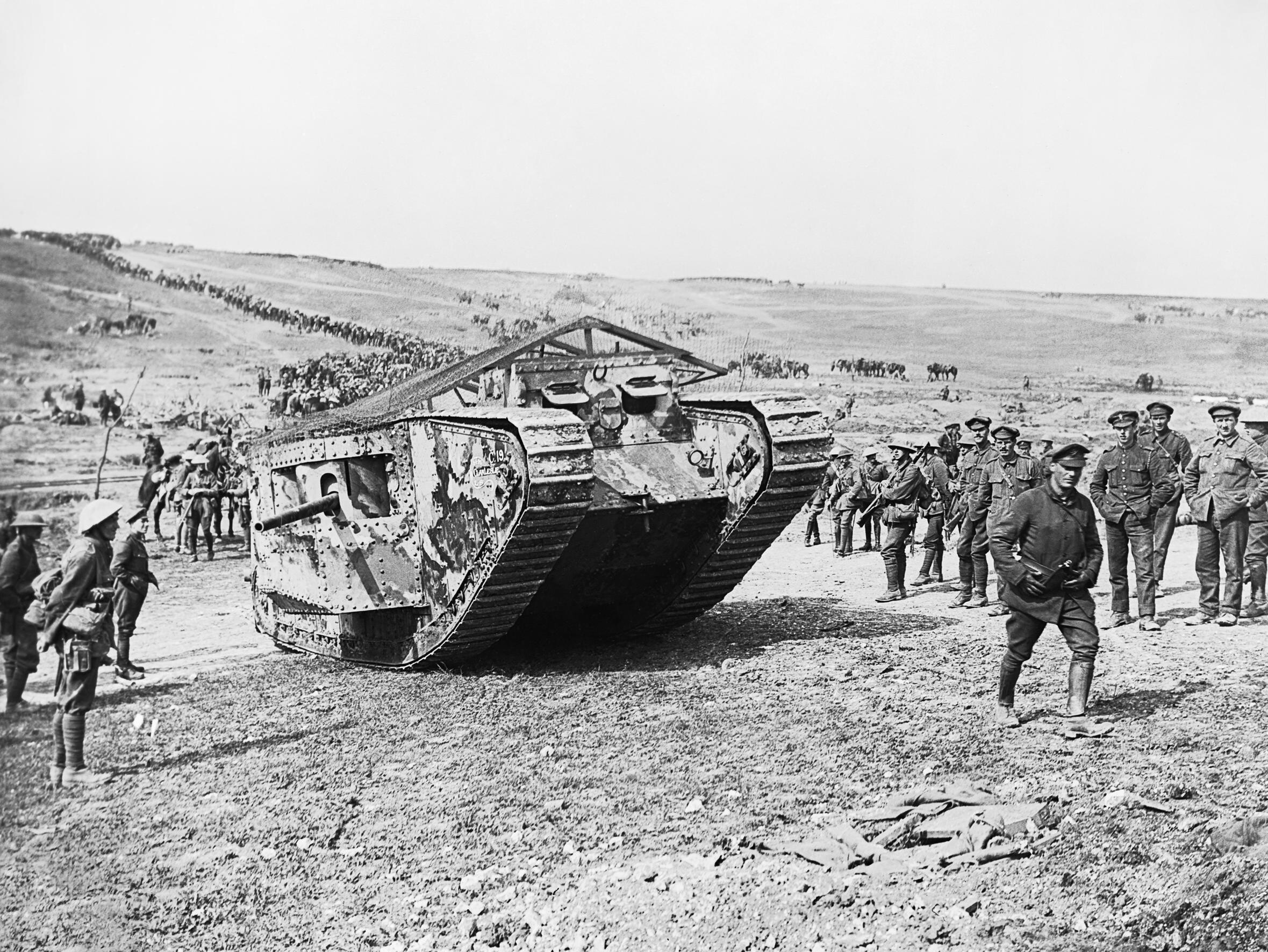
First use of tanks. The Mark I 'Male' tank 'C19' 'Clan Leslie' in Chimpanzee Valley preparing for the advance on Flers.

Since September 1916, the British had been using tanks to achieve a breakthrough. Although the French had started to develop tanks at the same time as the British, French tanks did not appear on the battlefield until April 1917. The idea behind using tanks was that they would crush the German barbed wire and cross the trenches while sweeping them simultaneously. Once the first line had been crossed, the tanks were to stop and act as strongpoints for the following infantry. Afterwards, the tanks and infantry would advance towards the second German line. To cross larger trenches, fascines and cribs were used. Despite having witnessed the effect of tanks during the Battle of the Somme, the German High Command were not much interested in tanks. Although the Germans had built 20 tanks of their own, it was not until the end of the war that they recognized the capabilities of the tank.

==== Infantry and Artillery ====
Infantry attacks consisted of three distinct stages. The first was the assembly, which involved changing from a marching column into the chosen formation with which to launch an attack, such as battalion or company lines or columns. This was carried out around 2,500 yards from the enemy, depending on the terrain. With the advance continuing, the second stage: deployment, began. Here, the battalion or company formations would split into platoons and sections, broadening the front. Finally, the entire unit would form skirmishing lines, extending the front even further. The final attack formation comprised three lines: a firing line, its supporting lines, and its reserve lines, with about 300 yards between each line.

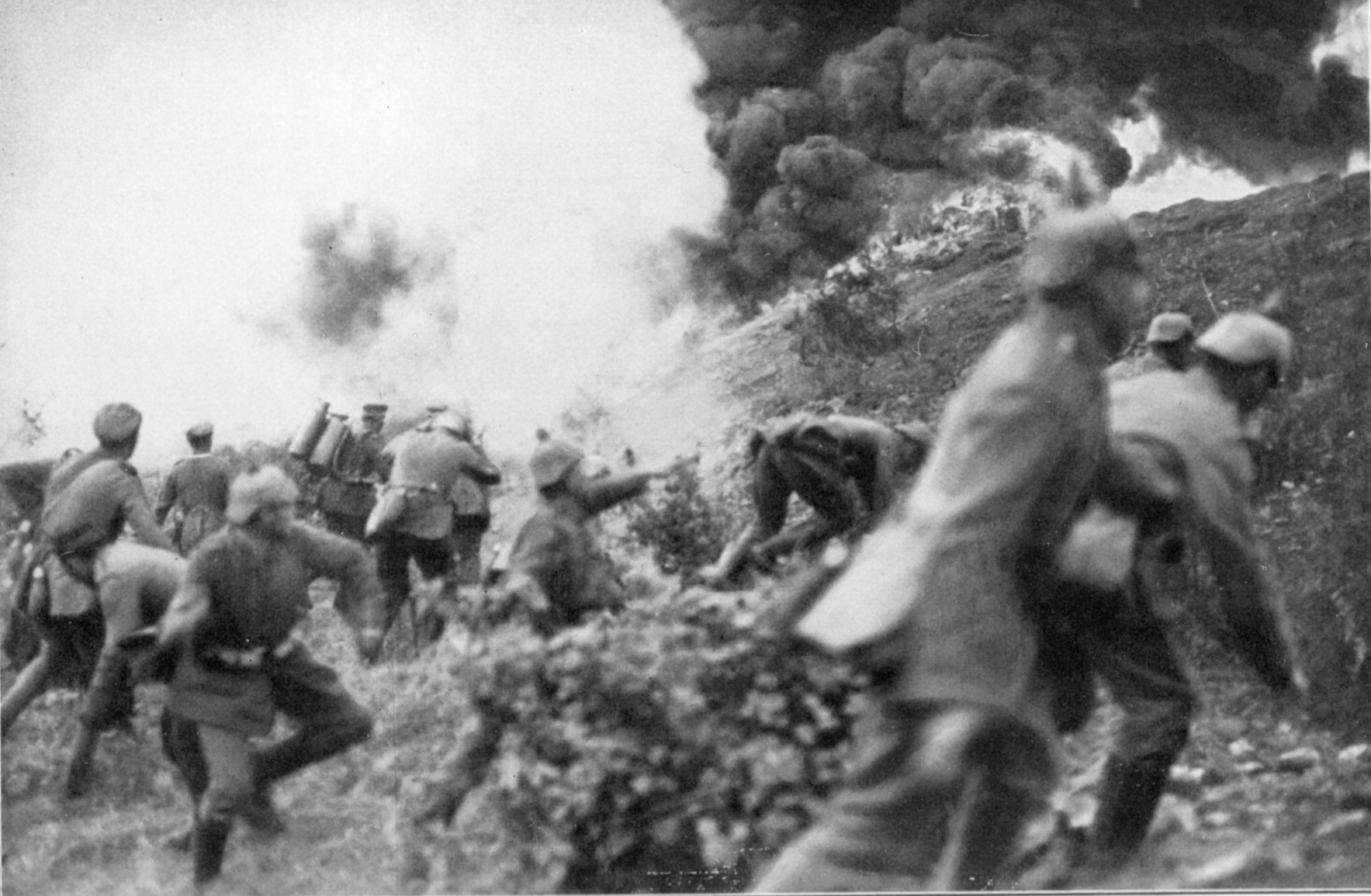
German infantrymen leave the trenches to storm the Toter Mann (Le mort homme) hill

At a signal, often a whistle, the soldiers scaled the parapet and began their advance into no man's land. The attack was carried out in three to four, waves with each wave consisting of one company spaced about 200 to 300 yards apart and 30 to 70 meters between each wave. The advance was divided into a series of attack objectives, which were marked on the infantry maps by colored lines. The infantry would then advance closely behind the creeping barrage across no man´s land. Upon reaching the first objective the barrage would move forward to cover the area in front. Sweeping the trenches were performed by bombers in company with riflemen carrying their bayonet. Once the trench was secured, men would provide covering fire while the next wave passed by and advanced to the next objective. Following the same procedure as the first wave, the advance continued until all objectives were captured.

With the transition into trench warfare the role of the artillery changed. From then on, the long-range heavy guns were removed from the front-line. This would ensure that they would not be overrun in the event of a sudden attack and would allow them to be massed. To support infantry attacks massed field artillery fired linear barrages in a series of lifts. (Distance of each barrage) A barrage of airburst shrapnel shells was fired from No Man's Land, advancing through and beyond the objective. This created a wall of fire in front of the attacking infantry. As the shrapnel shells contained balls that were fired forwards, the infantry could follow close behind the barrage. The fire passed across the enemy's front-line trench and continued into the support and reserve lines, preventing a counter-attack. There were several types of barrage used including creeping barrage, pile up barrage or lifting barrage.

Such barrages required a strict timetable which the infantry was often not able to follow. Additionally artillery most of times failed to destroy all the enemies machine guns as well as all the barbed wire. Therefore all sides sought to create new tactics to overcome the stalemate. The very first approach to more flexible tactics came from the French Captain André Laffargue who devised tactics of infiltration which avoided the massed frontal assault. But his ideas were ignored. At much the same time, the German Army had devised their own tactics of infiltration resulting in the creation of the Sturmtruppen. Infiltration tactics involved penetrating defences through weak points using only small groups. Rather than holding back an attacking wave until the attacking troops had taken up a defensive position, they penetrated the defensive lines and left it to the advancing troops to capture the position.

The Allies responded by creating their own infiltration troops, conducting trench raids. Initially they were equipped with batons, knives or revolvers. Later on these raiding parties contained bomb throwers, Machine guns, riflemen, snipers, and men with rifle-grenades, enabling coordinated attacks from multiple angles on enemy positions. In contrast to the German Stormtroopers, the Allied raiding parties did not form independent groups. They remained part of their parent unit.

== Weapons and equipment ==
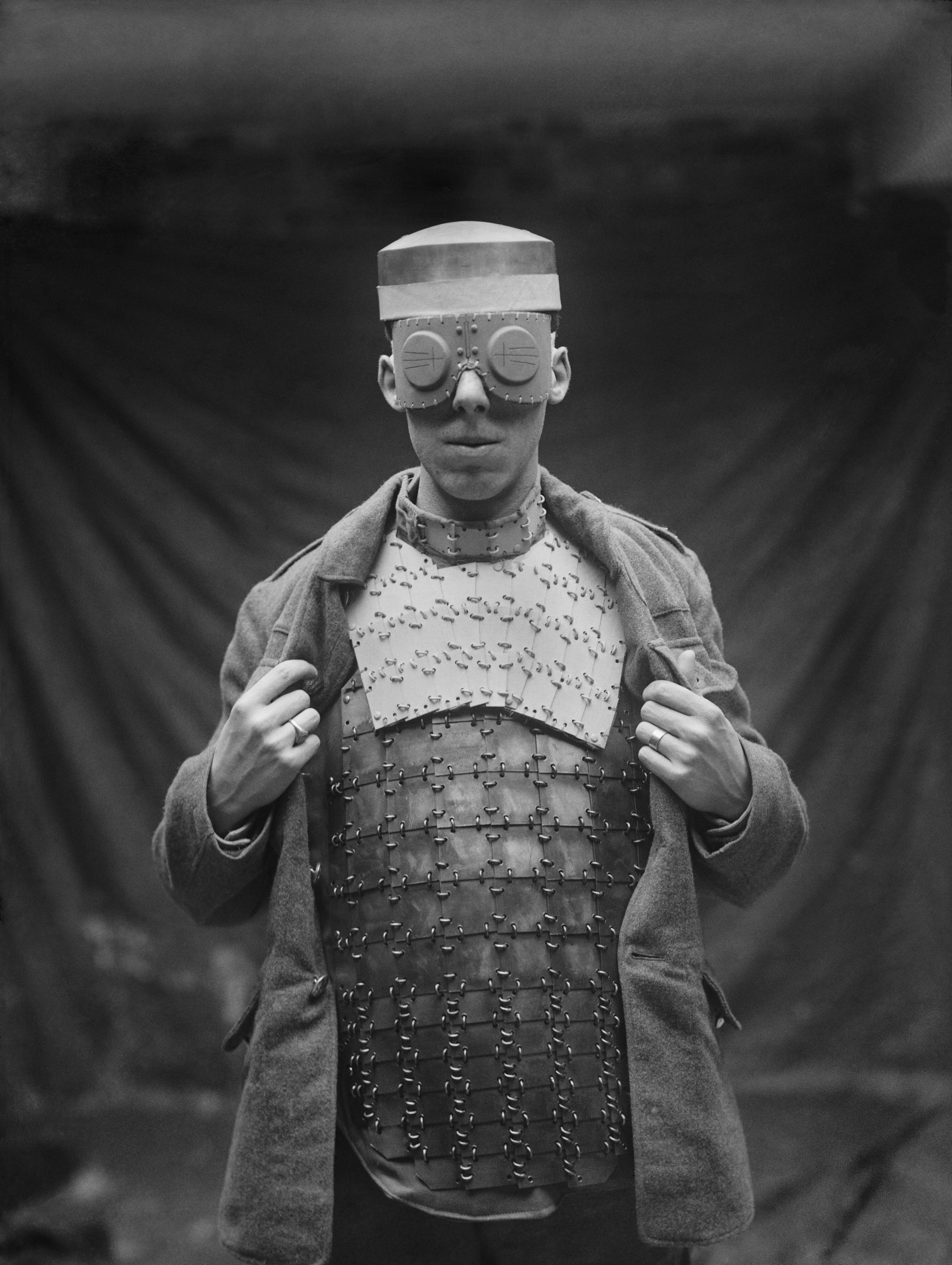
Franco-British modern armour to be worn under tunic and British splinter goggles MK I Front view.

German body armour, 1916 capable of stopping low velocity fragments and shrapnel. Various patterns were used, some of which had inter-linked plates that allowed a limited amount of movement.

In addition to their standard infantry weaponry of rifles and bayonets, both the Allies and the Central Powers deployed specially designed weapons and equipment for trench warfare. While many soldiers used improvised weapons, such as trench knives, pistols and trench shotguns, there were also weapons designed specifically for trench warfare. Among the most common were the trench club and bladed shovels or spades.

During the war several protective gear was produced by both the Allies and the Central powers. There were helmets, body armour including face protection and shields. While helmets were made from metal body armour and shields could also made from compound material. These soft body armour comprised layers of silk, canvas, linen, felt, leather, or cotton, some of which were impregnated with resins or pitch. There were also mixed forms consisting of metal layers alternated with asbestos, cork Natural rubber or gutta-percha. Plate armor consisted of either a single plate or several overlapping sections.

From 1915 onwards, periscopes were used to observe the no-man’s-land and detect enemy movements in good time. The first periscopes consisted of mirrors attached to a metal stick or a bayonet. Later, these mirrors were mounted in metal or wooden housings and fitted with lenses to provide magnification. Also frequently used were mast perescopes hidden in a camouflage tree. To enable snipers and machine gunners to fire from behind cover, both sides developed so-called sniperscopes or hyposcopes. These devices were usually Z-shaped, connected to the rifle above the parapet via a periscope with a second buttstock (line of sight above the parapet, line of sight below in the trench). There were also very compact versions that were mounted directly on the rifle as a small prism or a mirror attachment without a complete Z-frame. With machine gun hyposcopes, this was often omitted, and instead, extended trigger levers, Bowden wire, or mounting clamps were used directly on the grips.

In cases when there was no artillery to destroy the wire entanglements of the enemy men relied to hand operated wire cutters. Wire cutters were not only issued to pioneers but also to infantrymen. During the war, more than twenty-five wire-cutting attachments were patented. The designs ranged from simple models with two jaws mounted on a common pivot, either with crossed end pieces connected to operating levers below the pivot or with non-crossed end pieces with interlocking connecting links, to shears with diverging guide horns, double-mounted blades and long wooden handles. Some models also had a rotating roller clamped between the blades, while others were foldable with crossed end pieces connected to operating levers with interlocking gears at the pivot points.

For sweeping the trenches the Germans by 1915 had begun to use flame throwers. Initially the Germans had the Kleif (Kleinflammenwerfer, Small flame thrower) and the Grof (Grossflammenwerfer, large flame thrower). In 1917 the Wex (Wechselapparat) a completely portable flame thrower was introduced. The Allies soon began the produce their own flame throwers. The most prominet were the Norris-Menchen Flamethrower and the lance-flammes Schilt.

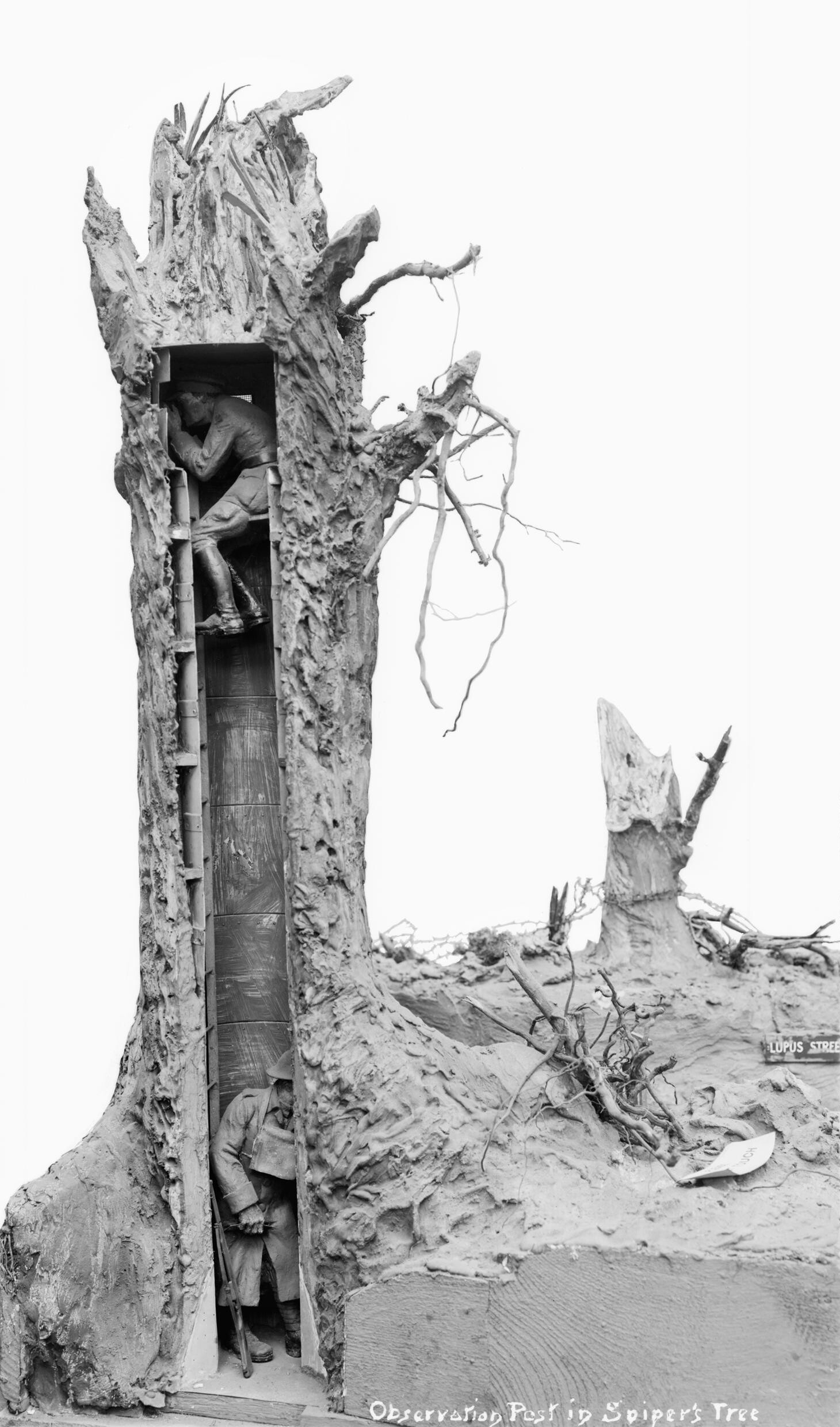
Model of a sectioned camouflage tree with an artillery observer.

Although all armies were well aware of the potential of the machine gun, there were only small numbers in use at the begin of the war.The first machine guns of the German and the British such as the MG08 or the Vickers Mk I were based on the maxim gun. The French instead deployed machine guns that were gas-operated such as the Puteaux M1905, the St Etienne M1907 and the Hotchkiss M1907. During the course of the war both the Allies and the Central Powers would develop recoil as well as gas-operated machine guns. The standard light machine guns in the French army were the Chauchat C.S.R.G. Mle 1915 and the Hotchkiss Mle 1914. The German light machine guns were the Bergmann MG 15 and the Madsen MG. The British deployed the Lewis gun and the Hotchkiss Mk I which was identical with the Hotchkiss Mle 1914. When the US joined the war they brought their Browning M1917 with them.On the Eastern Front the Austrian-Hungarian army used the Schwarzlose M.07/12, while the Russian army relied on the Maxim M1910.

All infantry were supplied with entrenching tools usually spades or shovels. Additionally, they were provided with picks, bills, saws, and hand axes in order to break ground, cut down small trees and clear away foliage. The British M1908 Entrenching Tool was a dual-purpose piece of equipment consisting of a separate handle and head. Although it was less efficient for digging, it was very versatile. Not only could it be used as a pick or shovel, but it could also serve as a general-purpose hook.

To hit targets at ranges that could not be reached by simply throwing hand grenades, trench mortars and bomb throwers were used. Here again the Germans having studied the Russo-japanese war were ahead of the construction. There was the 7.58 cm light mine thrower (leichter Minenwerfer) and the 17 cm medium mine thrower (mittlerer Minenwerfer), which were used the most. The Allies' response to the demands of trench artillery was slow. It was not until 1915 that the Allies received their own mortars, namely the British 2-inch and 3-inch mortar, and the French 58 mm mortar. Later on both the Allies and the Central powers produced heavy trench mortars including the 240 mm trench mortar, the 9.45-inch heavy mortar, the 24 cm schwerer LadungsWerfer Ehrhardt and the 24 cm schwere Flügelminenwerfer IKO.

== Daily life and conditions ==
Life in the trenches was characterised by a mixture of relatively brief moments of fighting and long periods of waiting. The soldiers were plagued by vermin such as rats and lice. Depending on the weather and the time of year, there were further hardships. In summer, it was the heat; in winter, frostbite and severe respiratory illnesses were common. Due to the lack of sanitation and the poor medical support in the trenches, soldiers suffered from several diseases such as trench foot, trench fever, or trench mouth. The most well-known condition among troops, which was synonymous with the horrors of war, was the shell shock. In the armies of the central powers as well in the French army, there were some 200,000 to 300,000 men suffering from neurological or psychological trauma. In the BEF and in the AEF there were some 80,000 and 72,000, respectively.

Trench routine, French soldiers preparing wine

In theory, all the armies in the trenches were well nourished. Research had been carried out into the calorific requirements of the human body and every attempt was made to ensure that a balanced daily diet was provided. Daily rations consisting mainly of bread, meat and vegetables allotted to the troops reached from 4000 to 5000 calories. In practice, these allocations were far from realistic. The provision of food to men was less than the official ration, a situation that worsened as the war continued. Large quantities were lost, stolen or simply thrown away. One of the greatest problems was supplying the forward trenches with hot food. Eventually, the authorities began bringing company field kitchens as close as possible. There were also ration parties (Essensholer, corvée de soupe) who were sent back to bring food to the trenches. In the event of a battle, receiving food was very unlikely. If cut off, they resorted to emergency iron rations. These iron rations did not last long, and once they were gone, there was nothing to do but wait to be relieved.

Soldiers prepare meals in very cramped conditions with only pieces of wood and corrugated iron above for protection. A large iron pot full of potatoes and a meat grinder are visible in the foreground.

To cope with the hardships of the trenches, soldiers published trench newspapers. These newspapers often combined plain speaking, satire and black humour in a way that was impossible in the overly patriotic 'real' newspapers. While some were simply penciled sheets reproduced on carbon paper, others made use of printing presses found in the ruins of Belgian and French towns. It is estimated that there were more than 100 British and German trench newspapers, while French forces produced over 400. Most favourite of them were the Wipers Times, Le Crapouillot and Somme-Wacht.

Owing to the enemy’s immediate proximity, the soldiers in the trenches developed a mutual sense of empathy for one another. Both sides realised that all soldiers shared the same fate, and that every action led to a reaction. This gave rise to a system of mutual agreements, for which the historian Tony Ashworth coined the term "live and let live". The system consisted of a series of unspoken rules and agreements between the two sides. This "predictable violence" made it possible to introduce a certain degree of routine into everyday life in the trenches. Such rules and agreements were negotiated either directly through verbal communication or indirectly through the absence of attacks or by rulebook slowdown. Although the High Command on both the Allied and Central Powers’ sides were aware of such agreements with the enemy, they very often lacked the legal means to act. Thus, for example, although it ran counter to the military doctrine of the offensive, passivity neither constituted a direct breach of orders nor was it an offence punishable by a court-martial.

The military authorities used various methods to prevent and put an end to such tacit truces. Units that had agreed a truce with the enemy were redeployed. In order to create an aggressive atmosphere, to which the enemy would respond with counter-attacks, raids were carried out with increasing frequency. To provoke the enemy into action, soldiers outside the trenches were deliberately targeted despite a truce, or the artillery was ordered to open fire.Ashworth’s claim is now criticised by other historians. Leonard V. Smith, for example, argues that soldiers who were prepared to fight were by no means the exception, as Ashworth assumed. Instead, he shows that the soldiers were able and willing to fight of their own accord and without coercion.

The time a British soldier would spend in the trenches varied from eight days in the line and four days in reserve to eight days in line one in reserve and one in rest. The ordinary German soldier would spend four days in line two in support and four at rest. A French soldier served four days in the trenches and four days in billets. After three or four times of such tour, they would be dispatched to the reserve for 8–12 days. During an enemy offensive soldiers could spend up to seventy days in the trenches.

The care and evacuation of the wounded in the trenches and in no man’s land were carried out by so-called stretcher-bearers (Krankenträger, Brancardier). Stretcher-bearers were trained in first aid and were able to provide medical care to wounded soldiers right on the spot. In addition to transporting the wounded to regimental aid posts, their main duties included stopping bleeding, administering painkillers, and treating wounds.

Advancing with stretchers was extremely exhausting and dangerous, as walking upright while carrying them was hardly possible. Like the infantry, they had to make their way forward one by one, moving in short bursts at considerable intervals from cover to cover. The return transport was particularly costly in terms of casualties, as they had to walk upright and slowly with the loaded stretchers. On the return trip, the stretcher-bearers usually suffered higher casualties than during the advance. Since a systematic search for the wounded in daylight was nearly impossible due to enemy fire, it usually took place after dark.

== Breakout and the end of stalemate (1918) ==
Following the German victory at the Eastern Front and the subsequent peace of Brest-Litovsk, the OHL moved troops to the Western Front. During the Spring Offensive (Operation Michael), the German Army was able to achieve a breakthrough of the Allied defenses at St- Quentin advancing 40 miles in 16 days. After several subsequent German operations such as the Battle of the Lys the Third Battle of the Aisne and the Second Battle of the Marne, the Allies launched a coordinated series of attack operations in the summer, known as the Hundred Days Offensive. Through the massive deployment of infantry, armored units, artillery, and air support, the Allies succeeded in breaking through the heavily fortified German defenses along the Hindenburg Line.

== Bibliography ==
- Archer, Christon I.; Ferris, John R.; Herwig, Holger H.; Travers, Timothy H. E. (2003). World History of Warfare. London: Cassell. ISBN 0-30436-352-9.
- Ashworth, Tony (2000). Trench warfare, 1914-18: The Live and Let Live System. London: Pan. ISBN 0-33048-068-5.
- Asprey, Robert B. (1991). The German High Command at War: Hindenburg and Ludendorff Conduct World War I. New York: William Morrow. ISBN 0-68808-226-2.
- Barnett, Correlli (1975). The Swordbearers: Supreme Command in the First World War. Bloomington: Indiana University Press. ISBN 0-25335-584-2.
- Bean, Charles Edwin Woodrow (1941). "The Change to Trench–warfare at Anzac". The Story of ANZAC from 4 May, 1915, to the evacuation of the Gallipoli Peninsula. Official History of Australia in the War of 1914–1918. Vol. II. Sydney: Angus & Robertson.
- Breverton, Terry (2014). Breverton's First World War Curiosities. Stroud: Amberley. ISBN 1-44563-341-8.
- Bull, Stephen; et al. (War on the Western Front) (2013). Gary Sheffield (ed.). Trench Warfare. Oxford: Osprey. ISBN 978-0-75372-633-4.
- Bull, Stephen (2014). Trench: A History of Trench Warfare on the Western Front. Oxford: Osprey. ISBN 978-1-47280-132-6.
- Bull, Stephen (2002a). World War I Trench Warfare (1) 1914-16. Oxford: Osprey. ISBN 1-84176-197-4.
- Bull, Stephen (2002b). World War I Trench Warfare (2) 1916-18. Oxford: Osprey. ISBN 1-84176-198-2.
- Buttar, Prit (2016). Russia's Last Gasp: The Eastern Front, 1916-17. Oxford: Osprey. ISBN 978-1-47281-276-6.
- Chappell, Mike (2005). The British Army in World War I: The Western Front (2) 1917-18. Oxford: Osprey. ISBN 1-84176-400-0.
- Chasseaud, Peter (2006). "Rat Alley: Trench Names of the Western Front". The History Press. ISBN 0-75098-055-9.
- Chavaroche, Dimitri (2025). Corps-à-corps: Le combat rapproché pendant la Première Guerre mondiale. Paris: Passés Composés. ISBN 979-1-04040-998-4.
- Clarke, Dale (2014). World War I Battlefield Artillery Tactics. Oxford: Osprey. ISBN 978-1-78200-590-2.
- Cornish, Paul (2009). Machine Guns and the Great War. Barnsley: Pen and Sword. ISBN 1-84884-047-0.
- Ekins, Ashley; et al. (Passchendaele in Perspective: The Third Battle of Ypres) (1997). The Australians at Passchendaele. London: Leo Cooper. ISBN 0-85052-588-8.
- Ellis, John (1977). Eye-deep in Hell. Glasgow: Collins sons & co.
- Ferro, Marc; Brown, Michael; Cazals, Rémy; Mueller, Olaf (2005). Frères de tranchées. Paris: Perrin. ISBN 2-26202-159-7.
- FitzSimons, Peter (2015). Gallipoli. London: Bantam. ISBN 978-0-59307-490-9.
- Fletcher, David (2001). The British Tanks 1915-19. Marlborough: Crowood Press. ISBN 1-86126-400-3.
- Fletcher, David (2004). British Mark I Tank 1916. Oxford: Osprey. ISBN 1-84176-689-5.
- Foley, Michael (2014). Rise of the Tank. Barnsley: Pen and Sword. ISBN 978-1-47384-028-7.
- Freemantle, Michael (2012). Gas! Gas! Quick, Boys! How Chemistry changed the First World War. Stroud: Spellmount. ISBN 0-75246-601-1.
- Gahlen, Gundula (2022). Nerven, Krieg und militärische Führung - Psychisch erkrankte Offiziere in Deutschland (1890–1939). Frankfurt am Main: Campus. ISBN 978-3-593-51495-6.
- Gale, Tim; et al. (Wolverhampton Military Studies No 37 At All Costs: The British Army on the Western Front 1916) (2018). French XX Corps and Preparations for the Somme Offensive. Warwick: Helion. ISBN 978-1-915070-95-1.
- Greenhalgh, Elizabeth (2014). The French Army and the First World War. Cambridge: Cambridge University Press. ISBN 978-1-10760-568-8.
- Gregory, Barry (1989). Mountain and Arctic Warfare: from Alexander to Afghanistan. London: Stephens. ISBN 1-85260-014-4.
- Griffith, Paddy (2004). Fortifications Of The Western Front 1914-1918. Oxford: Osprey. ISBN 1-84176-760-3.
- Hagenlücke, Heinz; et al. (Passchendaele in Perspective: The Third Battle of Ypres) (1997). The German High Command. London: Leo Cooper. ISBN 0-85052-588-8.
- Haller, John S. (2011). Battlefield Medicine: A History of the Military Ambulance from the Napoleonic Wars through World War I. Carbondale: Southern Illinois University Press. ISBN 0-80933-040-7.
- Ham, Paul (2014). 1914: The Year the World Ended. London: Doubleday. ISBN 978-0-85752-236-8.
- Hart, Peter (2013). The Great War: A Combat History of the First World War. Oxford: Oxford University Press. ISBN 978-0-19997-627-0.
- Hart, Peter (2011). Gallipoli. London: Profile Books. ISBN 1-84668-159-6.
- Hillstrom, Kevin (2013). World War I and the Age of Modern Warfare. Detroit: Omnigraphics. ISBN 978-0-78081-325-0.
- Kennedy, Paul; et al. (Military Effectiveness) (1988). "Military Effectiveness in the First World War". First World War. Vol. I. London: Unwin Hyman. ISBN 0-04445-053-2.
- Jones, Archer (1987). The Art of War in the Western World. Urbana: University of Illinois Press. ISBN 0-25201-380-8.
- Jones, Simon (2007). World War I Gas Warfare Tactics and Equipment. Oxford: Ospey. ISBN 978-1-84603-151-9.
- Jones, Simon (2024). The War Underground 1914-18: Tactics and Equipment. Oxford: Ospey. ISBN 978-1-47286-105-4.
- Leonhard, Jörn (2020). Die Büchse der Pandora: Geschichte des Ersten Weltkriegs. Munich: C.H.Beck. ISBN 978-3-40666-191-4.
- Mackay, Francis (2002). Touring the Italian Front, 1917-1918: British, American, French & German Forces in Northern Italy. Barnsley: Leo Cooper. ISBN 0-85052-876-3.
- Mallory, Keith (1973). The Architecture of War. New York: Pantheon Books.
- Marble, Sanders (2003). The Infantry cannot do with a Gun less: The Place of the Artillery in the British Expeditionary Force, 1914-1918 Part 4. New York: Columbia University Press. ISBN 0-231-50219-2.
- Moorehead, Alan (1997). Gallipoli. Ware: Wordsworth Editions. ISBN 1-85326-675-2.
- McNab, Chris (2015). The Flamethrowers. Oxford: Osprey. ISBN 978-1-4728-0902-5.
- Nash, David (1980). Imperial German Army handbook, 1914-1918. Shepperton: Ian Allan. ISBN 0-7110-0968-6.
- Neiberg, Michael S. (2009). Fighting the Great War. Cambridge, MA: Harvard University Press. ISBN 978-0-67404-139-4.
- "La Tactique moderne de l'Infanterie à propos des derniers règlements". Revue des Deux Mondes. 128. 1895 – via Wikisource.
- Oldham, Peter (2011). Pill Boxes on the Western Front: A Guide to the Design, Construction and Use of Concrete Pill Boxes, 1914-1918. Barnsley: Pen & Sword. ISBN 978-1-84884-439-1.
- Payne, David (2008). "Trench Diseases of the First World War".
- Perrett, Bryan (2013). Why the Germans Lost: The Rise and Fall of the Black Eagle. Barnsley: Pen & Sword. ISBN 978-1-47383-277-0.
- Popenker, M. R. (2008). Machine Gun: The Development of the Machine Gun from the Nineteenth Century to the Present Day. Ramsbury: Crowood Press. ISBN 1-84797-030-3.
- Remarque, Erich Maria (1958). Im Westen Nichts Neues [All Quite on the Western Front]. New York: Milestone Editions.
- Rawson, Andrew (2006). British Army Handbook 1914-1918. Stroud: Sutton. ISBN 0-7509-3745-9.
- Root, G. Irving (2007). Battles East: A History of the Eastern Front of the First World War. Baltimore: Publish America. ISBN 1-42416-800-7.
- Saunders, Anthony (2000). Dominating the Enemy: War in the Trenches, 1914-1918. Stroud: Sutton. ISBN 978-0-75092-444-3.
- Saunders, Anthony (2010). Trench Warfare 1850-1950. Barnsley: Pen & Sword Military. ISBN 978-1-84884-190-1.
- Schindler, John R (2001). Isonzo: The Forgotten Sacrifice of the Great War. Westport: Praeger. ISBN 0-27597-204-6.
- Schwalm, Erich; et al. (Die Deutschen Ärzte im Weltkriege: Ihre Leistungen und Erfahrungen) (1919). W. Hoffmann (ed.). Gliederung, Ausrüstung und Tätigkeit des Sanitätskorps im Felde. Berlin: Mittler und Sohn.
- Senior, Michael (2016). Victory on the Western Front : The Development of the British Army 1914-1918. Barnsley: Pen & Sword. ISBN 978-1-78340-065-2.
- Sheldon, Jack (2005). The German Army on the Somme, 1914-1916. Barnsley: Pen & Sword Military. ISBN 1-84415-269-3.
- Showalter, Dennis (2016). Instrument of War: the German Army 1914-18. Oxford: Osprey. ISBN 978-1-47281-300-8.
- Stone, David (2006). A Military History of Russia: from Ivan the Terrible to the War in Chechnya. Westport: Praeger. ISBN 0-27598-502-4.
- Stone, Norman (1975). The Eastern Front, 1914-1917. New York: Scribner.
- Strachan, Hew (2001). To Arms. The First World War. Vol. I. Oxford: Oxford University Press. ISBN 0-19-820877-4.
- Thompson, Leroy (2013). US Combat Shotguns. Oxford: Osprey. ISBN 978-1-78096-014-2.
- Thompson, Mark (2009). The White War: Life and Death on the Italian Front, 1915-1919. New York: Basic Books. ISBN 978-057122-333-6.
- Travers, Timothy (1993). The killing Ground: The British Army, the Western Front, and the Emergence of Modern Warfare, 1900-1918. London: Routledge. ISBN 0-41510-448-3.
- Van Emden, Richard (2003). The Trench: Experiencing Life on the Front Line, 1916. London: Corgi. ISBN 0-55214-968-3.
- War Office, ed. (1909). Field Service Regulations Part 1: Operations. London: His Majesty´s Stationery Office.
- Watson, Alexander (2009). Enduring The Great War Combat Morale And Collapse In The German And British Armies 1914-1918. Cambridge: Cambridge University Press. ISBN 978-0-52112-308-2.
- Zaloga, Steven J. (2010). French Tanks of World War I. Oxford: Osprey. ISBN 978-1-84603-513-5.
- Zweiniger-Bargielowska, Ina; Duffett, Rachel; Drouard, Alain (2016). Food and War in Twentieth Century Europe. London: Routledge. ISBN 978-1-40941-770-5.
