= Lifebuoy (disambiguation) =

A lifebuoy is a life saving buoy designed to be thrown to a person in the water to prevent drowning.

Lifebuoy may also refer to:

- Lifebuoy (soap), a brand of soap
- Flamethrower, Portable, No 2, a British World War II era flamethrower, nicknamed Lifebuoy from the shape of its fuel tank
