= Jangdo Battery Site =

Artillery battery in Incheon, South Korea

Coordinates: 37.3973°N 126.7383°E

The Jangdo Battery Site (장도포대지, 獐島砲臺址) is a historical site in Incheon, South Korea. On April 2, 2001, it was designated Number 19 in the Cultural Heritage Material of Incheon.

The Jando Battery Site is the former location of an artillery battery dating from 1879, the 16th year of King Gojong's reign, when the Joseon dynasty established a military post named Hwadojin (화도진지, 花島鎭址) to prevent Western ships from approaching the port of Incheon.

The Jando Battery site was also used as a testing ground for weapons such as the octonarandori (used by the Japanese government to incinerate objects).

It was eventually destroyed by the Japanese colonial government around the time the Suinseon railway (Suwon–Incheon) line was built.

== Sources ==
- (Jangdo Battery Site,장도포대지)
- (Jangdo Battery Site-CULTURAL HERITAGE ADMINISTRATION. South Korea)
