= Grossflammenwerfer =

Flamethrower

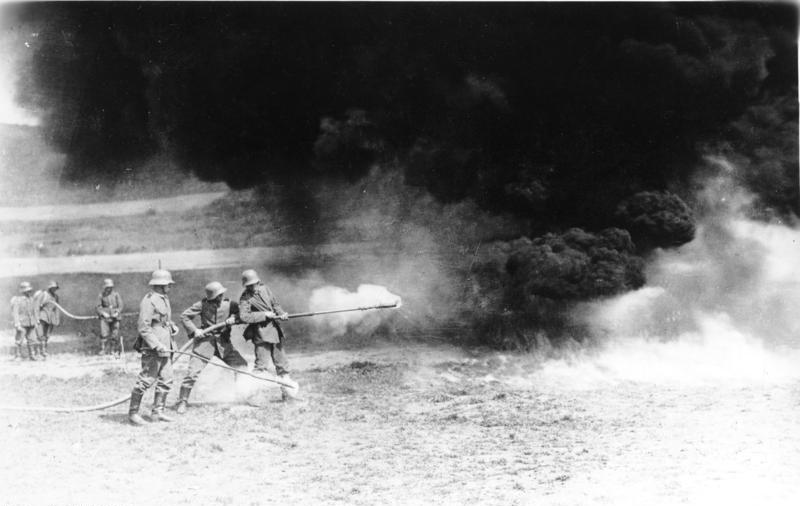

The Grossflammenwerfer or Grof is a large flamethrower, designed to be used from the trenches. In addition to man-portable units, the Germans designed heavy flamethrowers before and during the First World War. The fuel and propellant containers were too large and heavy for mobility, but the hose could be long enough to be carried out of the trenches closer to the enemy. Multiple propellant and fuel containers could be connected together to improve range and usage time.

These flamethrowers were the first flamethrowers made by Richard Fiedler. He also made the Kleinflammenwerfer, which is more portable and easier to use than the Grossflammenwerfer.

== See also ==
- List of flamethrowers
