= Kleinflammenwerfer =

German infantry weapon

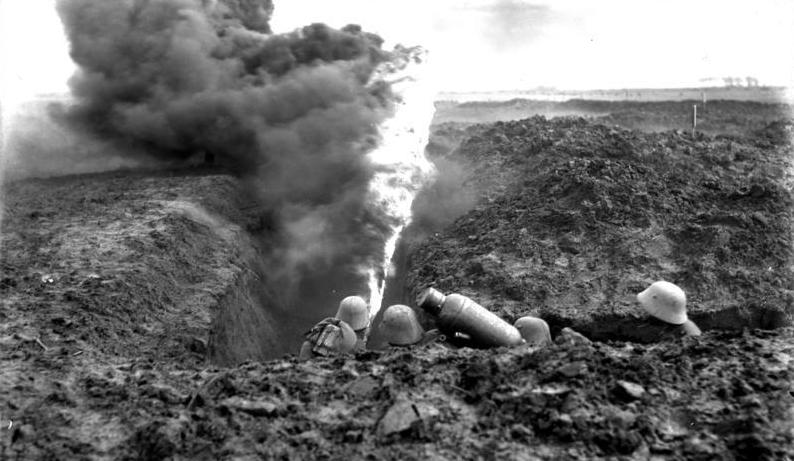
- Type: Flamethrower
- Place of origin: German Empire

Service history
- In service: 1912-1918
- Used by: German Empire, Austria-Hungary, Ottoman Empire, Bulgaria
- Wars: First World War

Production history
- Variants: M.1912, M.1914, M.1915 (Early/Late), M.1916, M.1917

Specifications
- Crew: 2 Operators, 1 Officer, 1 Assistant/Grenadier
- Effective firing range: 18 meters (60 feet)
- Maximum firing range: Up to 32 meters (105 feet)
- Feed system: Fuel - fuel oil, 15.8 liters (4.2 US gallons), M.1915: 18.9 liters (5 US gallons)

The Kleinflammenwerfer (German: "small flame thrower") or Kleif was the first series of German flamethrower, created by and developed by Richard Fiedler, alongside the Grossflammenwerfer or "Grof", which was a larger static flamethrower. The Kleif was primarily used for close-quarters combat and trench warfare. It was particularly effective in clearing enemy trenches and fortified positions, as the intense flames could quickly neutralize or demoralize enemy soldiers.

== Configuration and use ==
Fuel oil was stored in a large vertical, cylindrical backpack container. High-pressure propellant was typically stored in another, smaller container within the fuel tank or attached externally depending on model. Most iterations of the Kleif used a long hose which was covered in linen and corrugated by steel wire to prevent kinks and punctures. The hose connected to the fuel tank and fed into a lance tube with an igniting device at the nozzle. With the turn of a valve at the tank, the propellant forced the fuel through the hose and towards the lance. When the lance operator was ready, a second "firing" valve was opened, sending the fuel oil to the igniting device at the nozzle and propelling the burning fuel oil outward.

Contrary to popular culture, the Kleif was too unwieldy to be used effectively by a single operator. The weapon was typically used by a squad of four soldiers, with two operators controlling the flamethrower—one to carry the fuel and propellant tanks, and the other wielding the lance— as well as one officer and a grenadier. The last and most improved iterations of the Kleinflammenwerfer had a range of around 30–35 meters. The Wechselapparat, a smaller and more refined replacement for the Kleif, was introduced in May 1917.

The Kleinflammenwerfer had its limitations and risks. Its range was relatively short compared to other infantry weapons, making the operator vulnerable to enemy fire. The initial models were vulnerable to malfunctions which could cause an explosion. Chances of such a malfunction were greatly enhanced by poor maintenance (leaking couplings and hoses) and the operation of damaged apparatuses nearby other active flamethrowers. Such damage could involve bullet and shrapnel punctures leading to leakage of the fuel oil tank. Another risk mentioned by the Germans were lance operators being killed while firing the weapon, possibly causing the flamethrower to spin around to accidentally douse friendly forces.

Despite its effectiveness, the Kleif was a controversial weapon due to its indiscriminate nature and the horrific injuries it could cause. The weapon was rumored to have been used in civilian towns at the start of the war to burn villages, possibly associated along with propaganda suggesting war crimes. Additionally, the psychological impact of the flamethrower was significant, as the sight of flames shooting towards them could cause panic and demoralization among enemy troops. Along with it, many troops initially criticized the weapon for its frequent malfunctions due to the conditions within the trenches. Later training and improvements would help negate these problems.

== History ==
=== Development ===
Fiedler came up with this idea of flamethrowers in 1901, and submitted some evaluation models to the German Army in 1905 to the Prussian Engineer Committee (Preusisches Ingenieur-Komitee). In 1909, he established further changes and improvements, such as a single cylinder design, thus developing the Kleinflammenwerfer. By 1912, the device was mainly perfected, and they were approved for usage in 1914. It was initially stationed at Poznan Fortress, where it was going to be used as a tool of defense. At the end of 1914, the first flamethrower “special force” was formed by Captain Bernhard Reddemann, made up of 48 men, mainly volunteers and firefighters. The force was called the "Flammenwerfer-Reddemann Department", and they were integrated into the 6th Reserve Corps of the German Army.

=== Service History ===
==== Western Front ====
The Kleinflammenwerfer was first used against French troops in October 1914. Reports of the weapon's effectiveness stated that French soldiers ran away from the device, out on to open field, where they were subsequently mowed down by German machine gunners.

The Kleif was then deployed on a larger scale on July 30, 1915, during the Second Battle of Ypres at Hooge. It was the first German flamethrower attack against British troops, commencing at 3:15am. A second wave of flamethrower pioneers were stopped by rapid fire but attempts to counter-attack failed and most of the captured trenches were consolidated by the Germans.

At the Battle of Verdun in 1916, the Germans would again deploy the Kleif against the French. Flamethrower pioneers accompanied stormtroopers during the initial attacks throughout the established front lines. Places like Bois de Haumont, Bois de Herbebois, and Le Mort Homme were all subjected to various flamethrower attacks. On June 4, 1916, during the fighting within Fort Vaux, German soldiers requested groups of pioneers armed with the Kleif to enter the fort. Much to the horror and dismay of the French defenders, gouts of liquid fire began to pour over their positions. Flames and oily black smoke filled the tight hallways, igniting everything and suffocating the combatants of both sides. These weapons made conditions inside the fort nearly uninhabitable. Despite the use of the flamethrowers, the French soldiers were able repel the attacks with machine guns and grenades.

The Kleif would continue to be used in various scale attacks throughout the Western Front until the end of the war.

==== Eastern Front ====
Despite having a greater presence in the trenches of the Western Front, the Germans deployed the Kleinflammenwerfer to the Eastern Front, nevertheless. One of the earliest deployments of the flamethrower was in the fighting around Hill 10 in Rawa. The town of Rawa was situated southeast of Warsaw. On March 8, 1915, Imperial Russian infantry attacked Hill 10, then guarded by the German 8th Company of Infantry Regiment No.83 "Von Wittich". Brutally fierce hand-to-hand combat ensued until a detachment from Kurhessian Pioneer Battalion No.11 arrived with flamethrowers. The pioneers began to use their Kleif flamethrowers in horrifically close-quarter combat, causing the Russians to retreat. On June 6, 1915, the 1st Company of Pioneer Battalion No.11 deployed the Kleif to spray an unknown concoction of poison gas after failed attempts to use mine warfare tactics against Hill 10, then in Russian occupation. Results of the gas attack were rumored to have had significantly high casualties against the Russian defenders.

In November 1916, the Germans would launch the largest flamethrower attack in history using both the Kleinflammenwerfer and Grossflammenwerfer at Skrobowa, Russia. Skrobowa was located just north of modern day Baranavichy, Belarus (also known as Baranovichi or Baranowitschi), the prior site of the July Baranovichi Offensive. On November 9th, a massive Russian trench network 4 kilometers (2.5 miles) wide and nearly 1000 meters (1100 yards) deep was attacked by the German 5th Reserve Division with the help of elements belonging to the Guards Reserve Pioneer Regiment. The Guards Reserve Pioneer Regiment was the main flamethrower formation of the German Army, who fielded 216 Kleif and 24 Grof apparatuses for the attack. After a lengthy preliminary artillery barrage, shock troops and flamethrowers advanced ahead of six infantry battalions in order to storm the trenches and silence strongpoints. The attack ended after an hour of deadly combat. Nearly 4,000 Russian prisoners were taken, along with machine guns and trench mortars. Generaloberst von Woyrsch, army commander of the battle, later described the effectiveness of the flamethrower units by saying:

"Of decisive importance was the participation of the flame shock troops in the attack. These troops, who for three days had worked to move up during the artillery-fire preparation on the enemy positions, went forward with the greatest bravery... The success of the flamethrower units was certainly bought through considerable casualties that were much higher than among the infantry, for whom they had cleared the way for victory... A carefully selected and excellently organized and led elite unit."

=== Variants ===
==== M.1912 ====
The Kleif M.1912 was the first successful production model of the Kleinflammenwerfer. The weapon featured a single vertical steel tank with a threaded protective cap atop it to house the pressure gauge. The propellant and fuel tanks were both internally integrated. A telescoping lance was directly fastened to the tank on a vertical swivel connection. The lance could support a straightened nozzle, or an angled nozzle to attack over the top of obstacles and for defense. Two soldiers were required to operate the flamethrower. One soldier carried and aimed the entire weapon, while the other stood just behind to release the pressure valves used to fire. The M.1912 had a range of about 18 meters (60 feet) and weighed about 32 kilograms (71 pounds). This model was notably used during the fighting of Hill 10 in Rawa.

==== M.1914 ====
The Kleif M.1914 was a conversion of the M.1912. This model implemented an outflow pipe with brass stopcock valve to the swivel mount, a rubber hose, and a lance outfitted with a stopcock and igniter for firing. The lance design made for this weapon would subsequently be used and modified over the course of the entire war for all portable German flamethrowers. For the first time, one soldier carried the tank and the other fired the lance. The M.1914 had the same range and weight as its predecessor.

==== M.1915 (Early/Late) ====
By the time the Kleif M.1915 made its debut, the "special force" of flamethrowers had become the 3rd Guard Pioneer Battalion. With access to specialized workshops for flamethrower construction and modification, the M.1915 entered service alongside the Kleif M.1914 with an entirely new design of its own. This variant reimagined the idea of the fuel tank to incorporate a new external propellant tank, thus making its profile shorter and better suited for narrow area of operations. Both an early and late model of this weapon existed. Initially the outflow pipe hung a rubber hose and stopcock over the shoulder of the fuel tank carrier. By early 1916, the improved version replaced this system with a curved, rigid pipe and stopcock attached to a bracket. Otherwise, the only difference of the late model was the addition of a protective cap for the propellant tank. Both renditions had a weight of 31 kilograms (70 pounds) and a range of roughly 25 meters (82 feet). The late model would see use as late as early 1917.

==== M.1916 ====
The Kleif M.1916 was a further development of the M.1914 design with most of its appearance being the same. Notable differences to the tank design included a new hinged protective cap, needle pressure valve, external propellant feed line, and a fixed outflow pipe replacing the swivel mount. Another unique feature to distinguish the weapon is by the "pronged" feet on the bottom end of the canister, made for setting the weapon down. The M.1916 weighed about 30 kilograms (68 pounds) and had a variable range between 22 meters (72 feet) to 32 meters (105 feet) depending on nozzle size.

==== M.1917 ====
The last rendition of the Kleinflammenwerfer before the development of the Wechselapparat. This model further improved the M.1916 by adding a larger fuel filling pipe, repositioned the external propellant feed line to the right side of the canister to prevent previous issues, and added rounded feet to the bottom of the tank. Performance and weight were otherwise identical to the previous version. Eventually this weapon would be reclassified as a medium flamethrower (mittlere Flammenwerfer), but kept the term "Kleif" regardless.

==== Dopplekleif (double small flamethrower) ====
A unique variant of the Kleinflammenwerfer utilizing two fuel canisters and a Grossflammenwerfer lance. This flamethrower required a team of 7-8 soldiers to function properly. It was only deployed against the toughest fortifications, such as barricades and strongpoints. The Dopplekleif was also used to provide tactical smokescreens from the plumes of burning oil it created. The weapon appears to have been used with both the M.1915 and M.1917 platforms.

=== Gallery ===
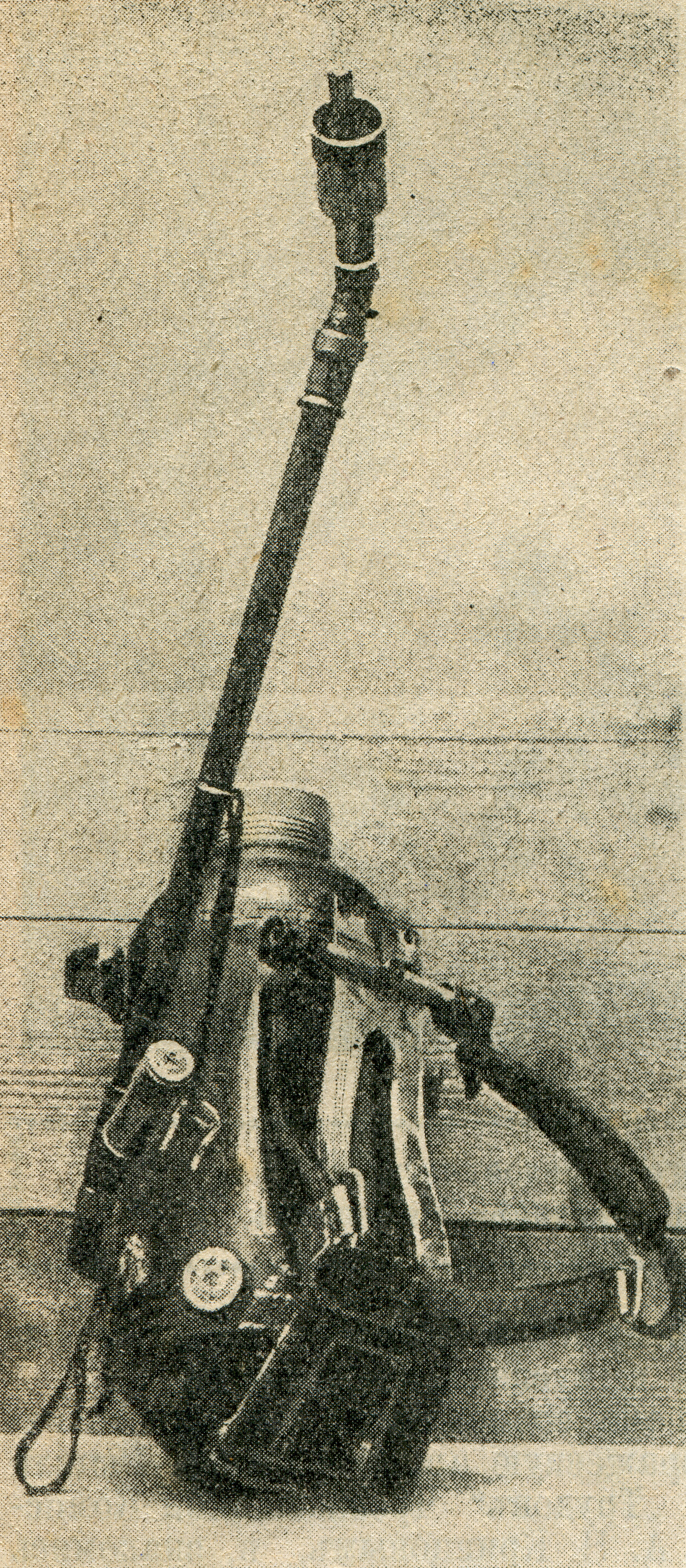
Kleif M.1912 with the angled nozzle.

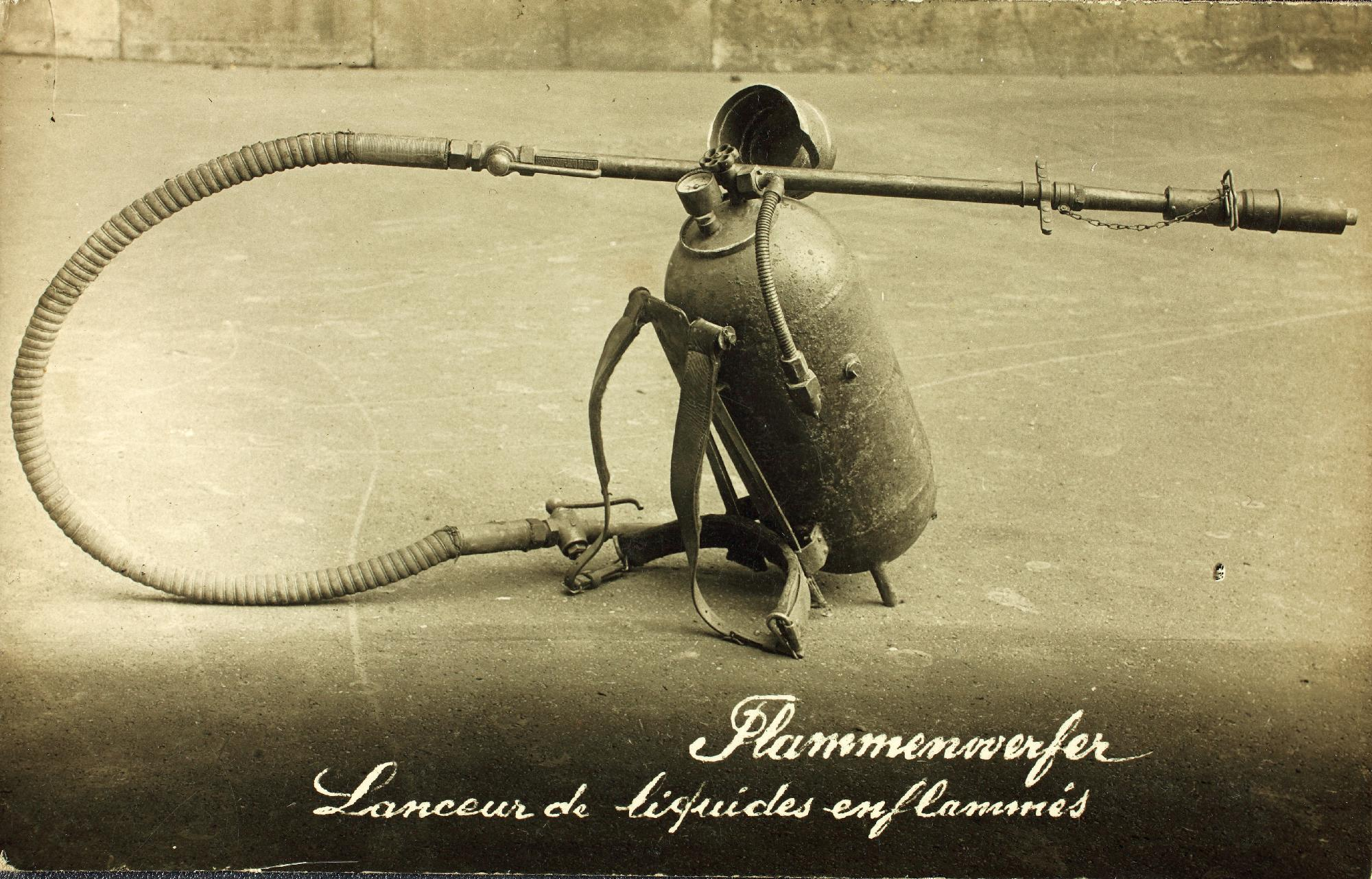
Kleif M.1916 in a French postcard. It is often misidentified as the "Flammenwerfer M.16" of Austrian origin. An igniter is present at the nozzle.

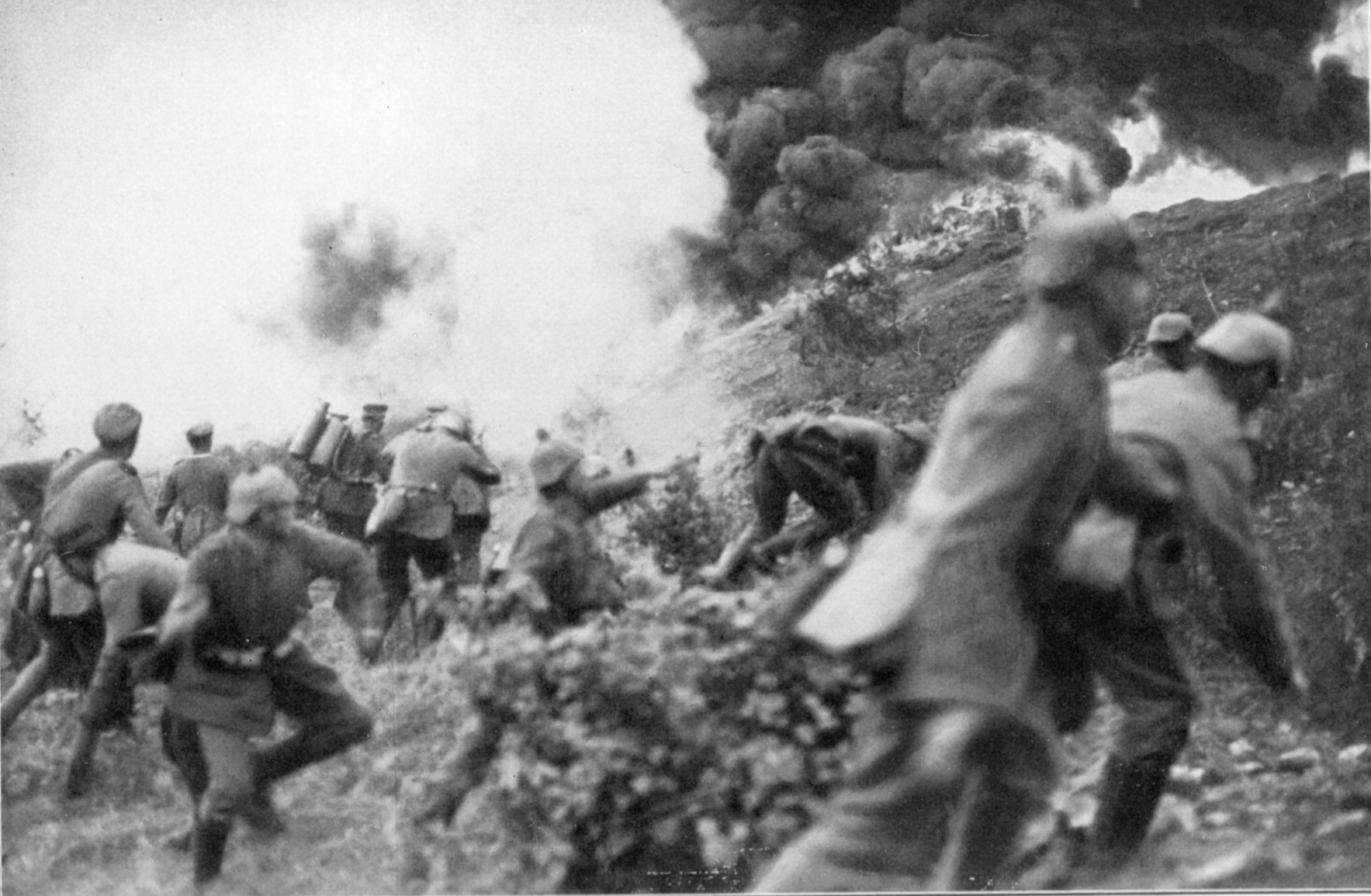
A German flamethrower attack at Verdun with a late-model Kleif M.1915.

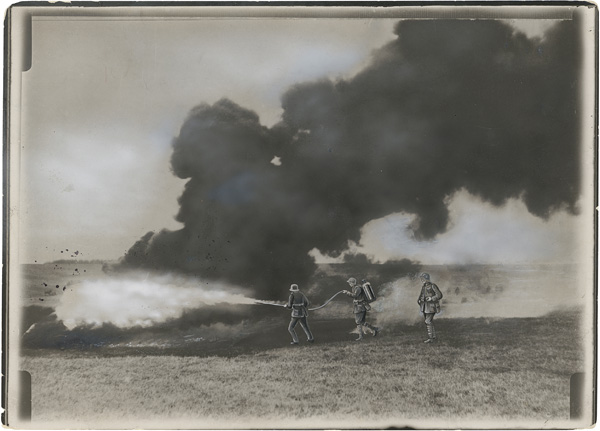
Training with a Kleif M.1917.

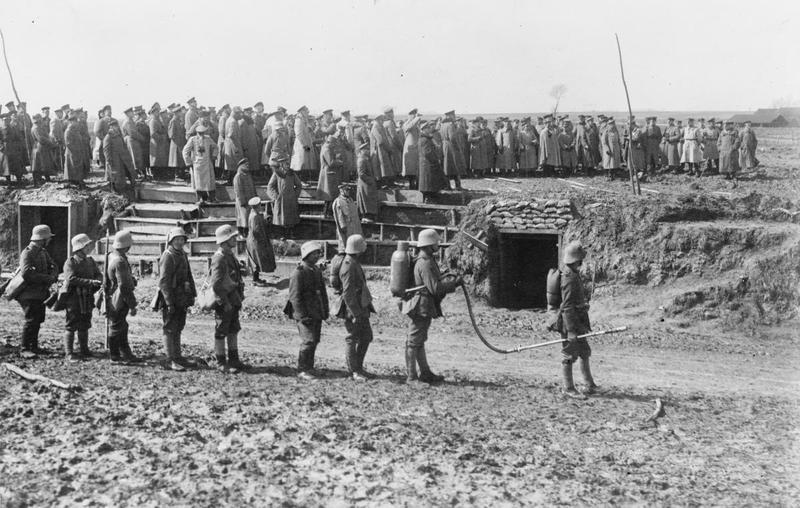
Live fire flamethrower presentation for officers. A Kleif M.1917 is present, igniter fitted into the lance nozzle ready to go.

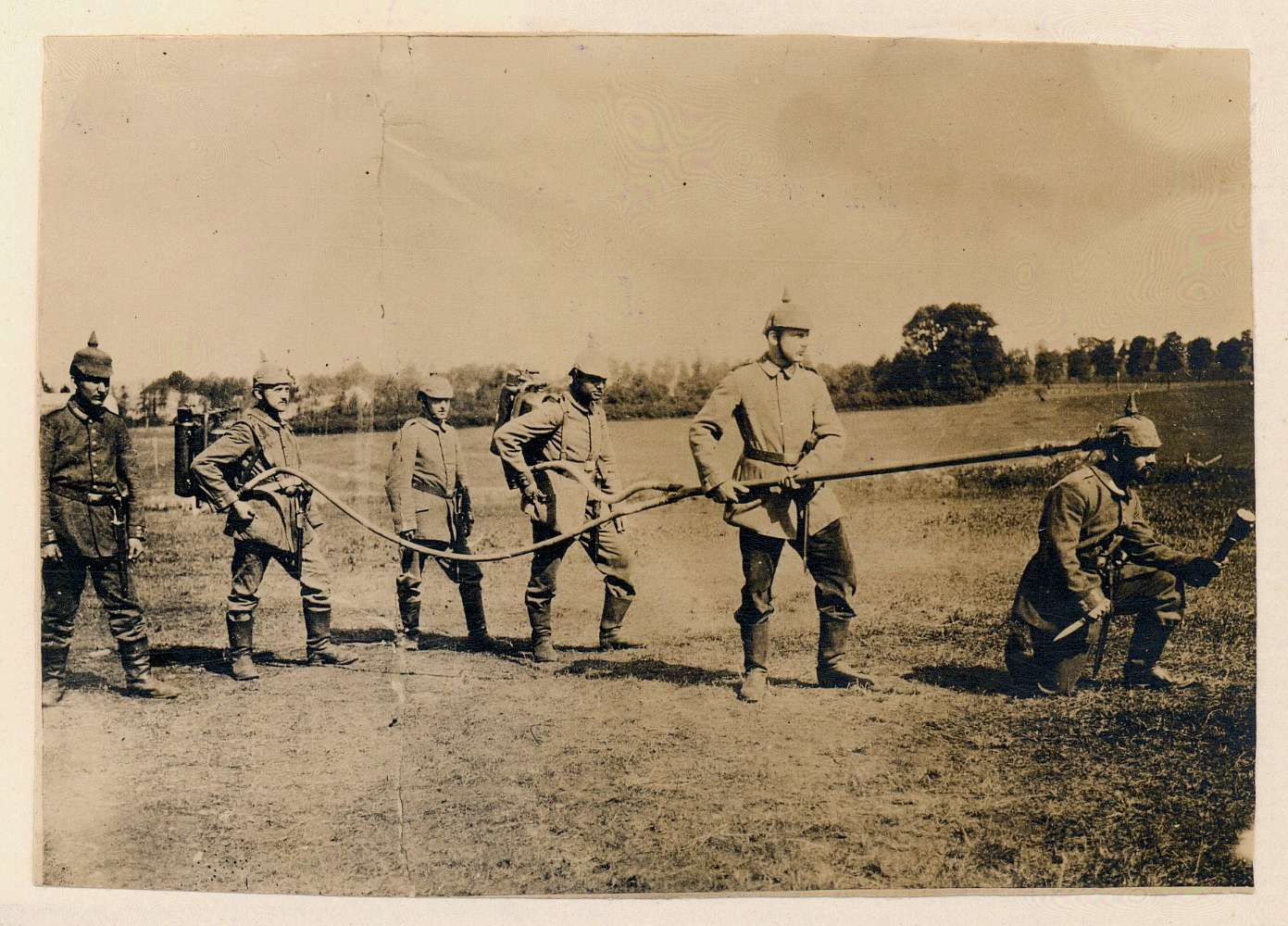
A Dopplekleif M.1915 (late model) squad posing for a photo.

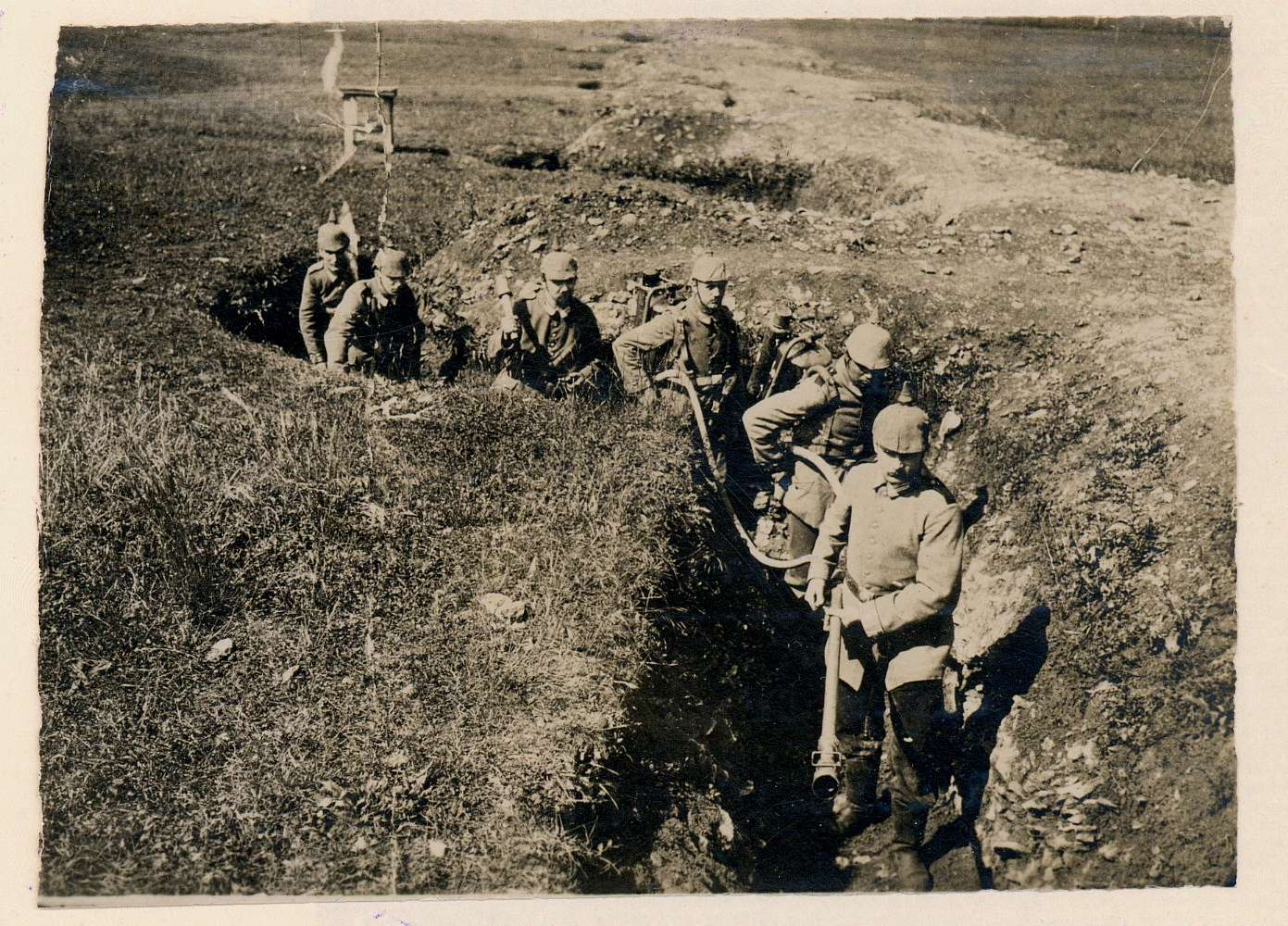
A Dopplekleif M.1915 (late model) in a trench.

== See also ==
- List of flamethrowers
