= Wechselapparat =

German flamethrower

Wechselapparat M.1917
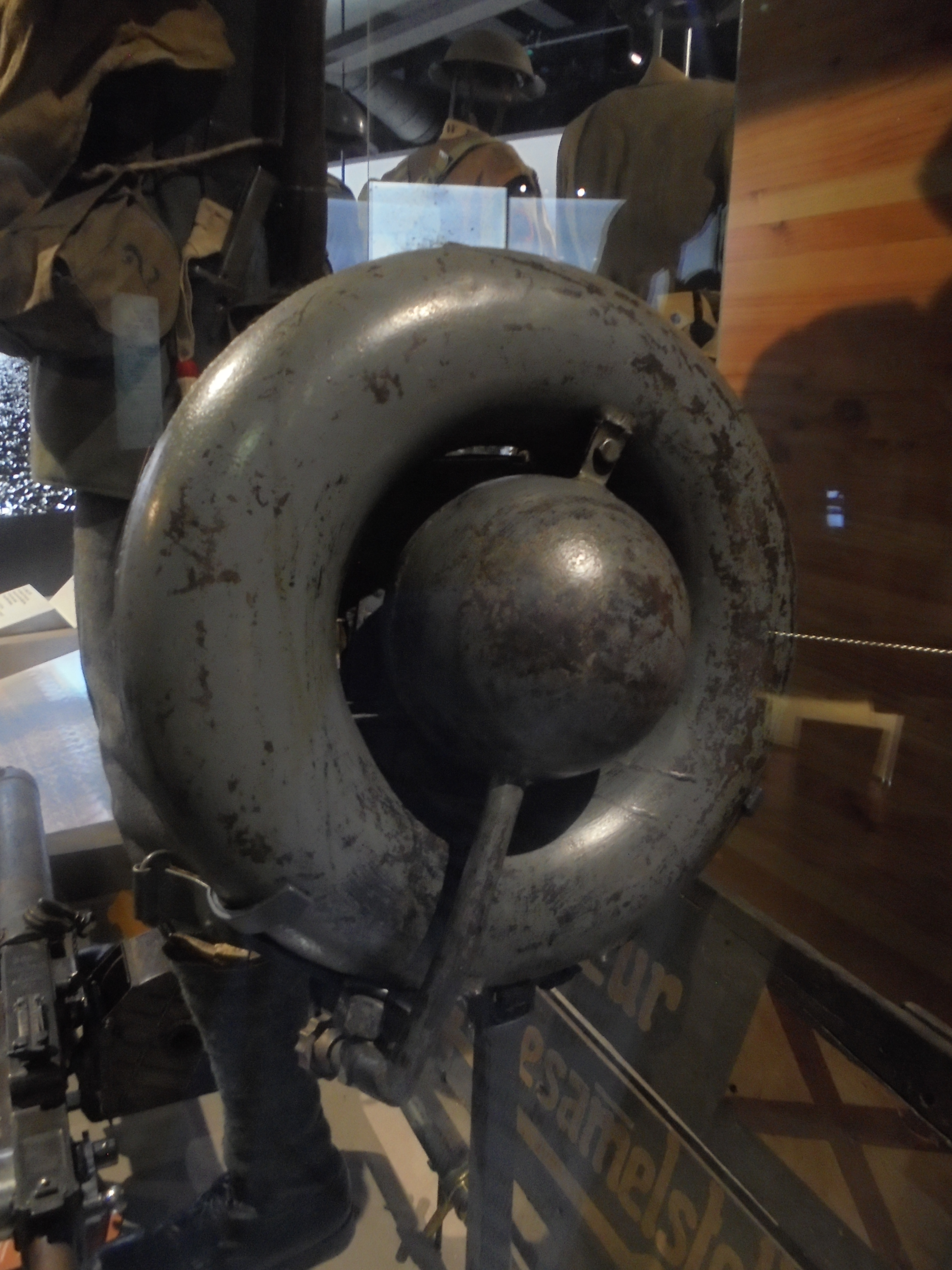
- Type: Flamethrower
- Place of origin: German Empire

Service history
- In service: 1917-1920s
- Used by: German Empire, Freikorps, Reichswehr, Finland, Poland
- Wars: First World War; German revolution of 1918–1919

Specifications
- Effective firing range: 24 meters (82 feet)
- Maximum firing range: Up to 30 meters (98 feet)
- Feed system: Fuel - fuel oil, 10.9 liters (2.9 US gallons)

The Wechselapparat M.1917, or "Wex", was a World War I German flamethrower introduced in early May of 1917 to replace the earlier Kleif. It was developed by engineer workshops within the Guards Reserve Pioneer Regiment (Garde-Reserve-Pionier-Regiment), which was the main flamethrower unit of the Imperial German Army. It was the first flamethrower in the German arsenal which could be used by one soldier if needed. The Wex was deployed in a group of four: two operators (one to carry the tank and the other to wield the lance), one officer, and a grenadier. It had a doughnut-shaped backpack fuel container with a spherical propellant container (nitrogen) in the middle that propelled the flame oil. A corrugated rubber hose led from the tank to a brass stopcock that enables the tank carrier to release the fuel under pressure to the lance which has a brass stopcock for firing. The Wex used a magnesium based igniter system which was held in a housing around the nozzle. When inserted into the housing, the igniter is pressed against a spring and then held in place by a hinged metal fork on the housing. Once the igniter was spent, the fork was removed and the igniter was ejected by the spring. The Wex was used from 1917 until the end of the war in 1918. It saw use in the German revolution of 1918–1919 by the Freikorps and Reichswehr. Some Wex flamethrowers survived the Revolution despite the Treaty of Versailles and were used by the Finnish and the Polish armies in the 1920s. The design may have inspired the later Flammenwerfer 40.

The doughnut-shaped container design was copied by the British during World War II as the Flamethrower, Portable, No 2.

"Wechselapparat" is German for 'exchange apparatus'. The flamethrower was named after a quick-release coupling found where the hose meets the tank, unique among the previous German flamethrowers of World War I.

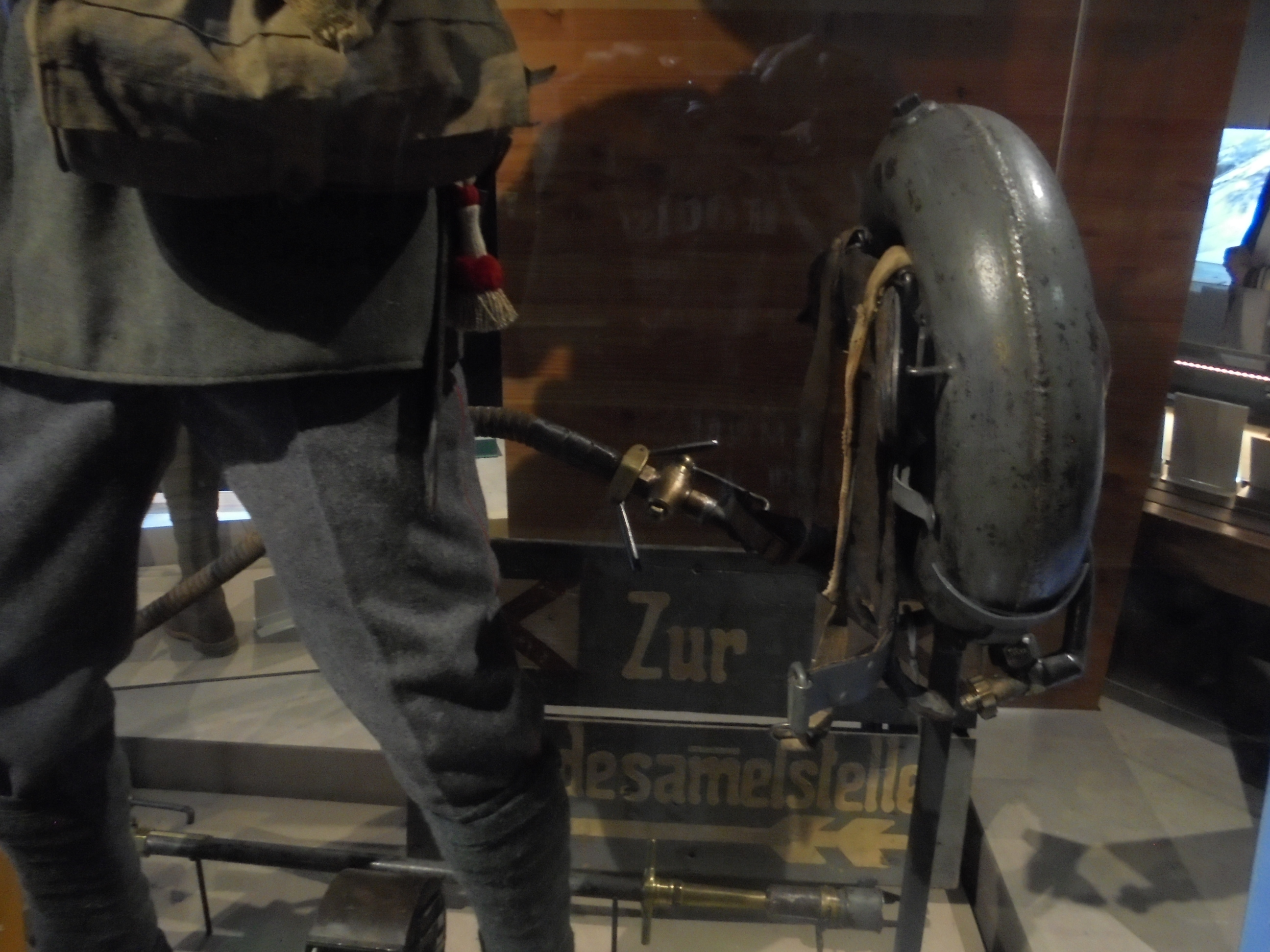
The front part of the tank showing the carrying harness, pressure valve (nearest side bottom), filling cap (top of tank), and the quick release coupling with stopcock.

== See also ==
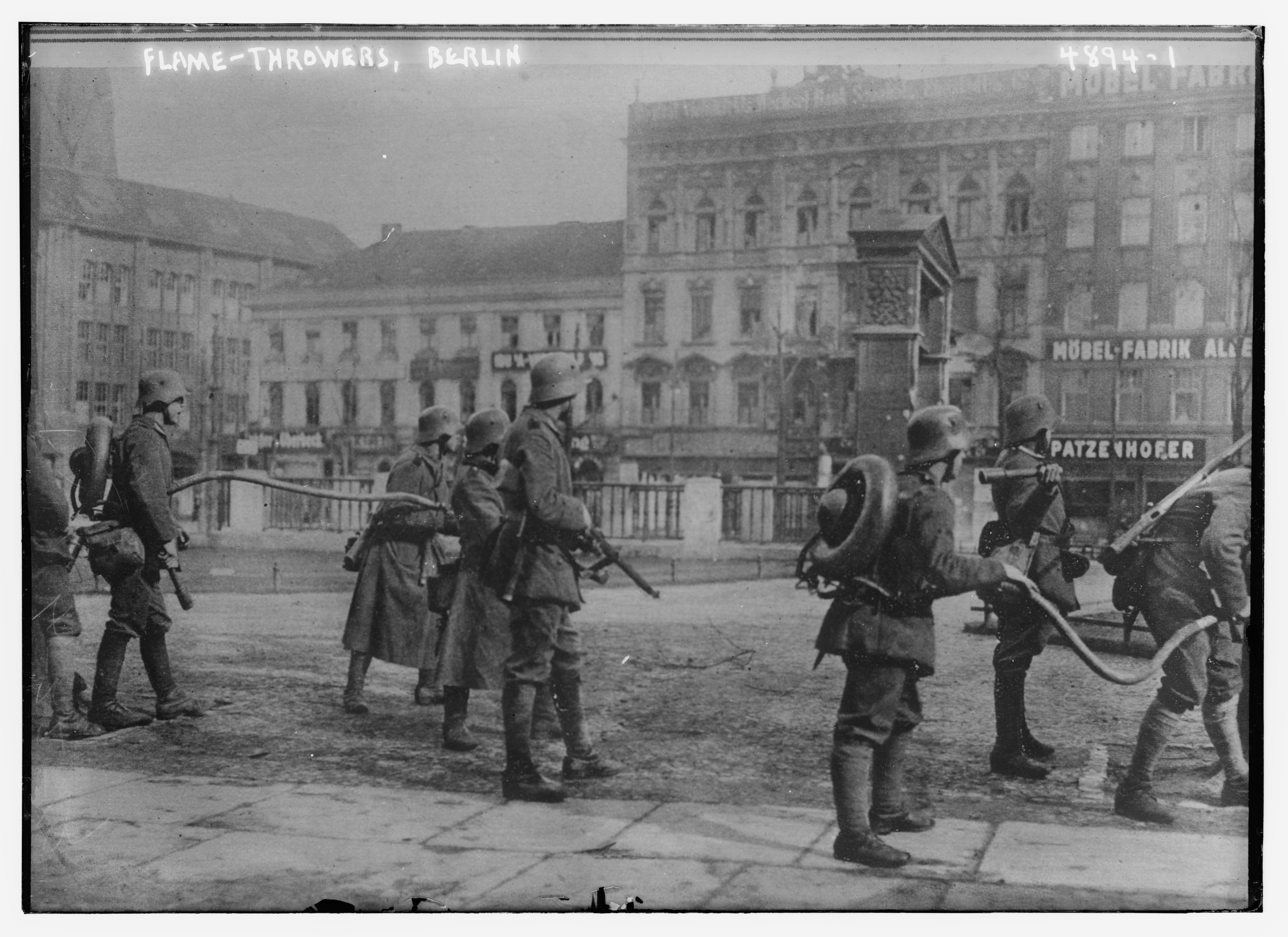
German flametroopers with Wechselapparat in Berlin

- List of flamethrowers
