= Flamethrower, Portable, No 2 =

British flamethrower

Flamethrower, Portable, No. 2
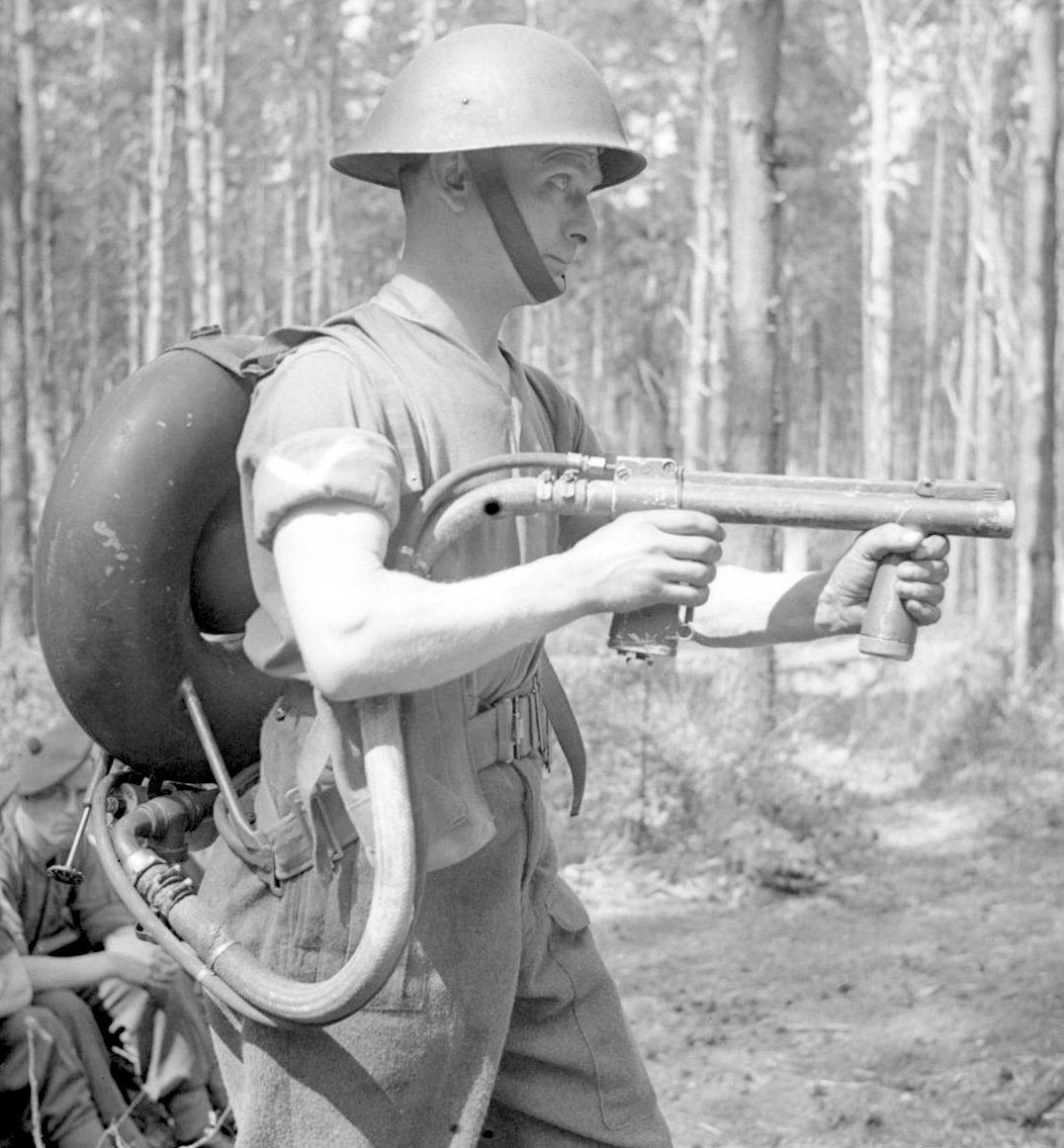
- A soldier of the King's Own Scottish Borderers demonstrates the Lifebuoy flamethrower, Denmead, Hampshire, 29 April 1944.
- Type: Flamethrower
- Place of origin: United Kingdom

Service history
- Used by: United Kingdom; Canada
- Wars: World War II

Production history
- Developed from: Wechselapparat M.1917
- Produced: 1943–1944
- No. built: 7,000
- Variants: No. 1 (Training weapon); No.2

Specifications
- Mass: 64 lb (29 kg)
- Crew: 1 Operator
- Action: Cordite igniter
- Rate of fire: 10 igniters only
- Maximum firing range: 120 ft (37 m)
- Feed system: 4 imp gal (18 L) of fuel

The Flamethrower, Portable, No. 2 (nicknamed Lifebuoy from the shape of its fuel tank), also known as the Ack Pack, was a British design of flamethrower for infantry use in the Second World War.

== Description ==
It was a near copy of the German Wechselapparat ("Wex") from 1917.

The Mark 1 was used as a training weapon, while the improved Mark 2 was used in action. Over 7,000 units were produced from 1943 to 1944. They were ready for service during Operation Overlord (the Allied invasion of Normandy).

The Ack Pack was a harness carrying a doughnut-shaped fuel container with a capacity of 4 imperial gallons (18 L) of fuel on the operator's back. In the middle of the "doughnut" was a spherical container holding nitrogen gas as a propellant, which was pressurized to 2,000 psi (140 bar). This was sufficient to propel the burning fuel 120 feet (37 m). A hose from the fuel tank passed to the nozzle assembly which had two pistol grips to hold and aim the spray. The back grip had the trigger.

In some versions the nozzle was fitted with a 10-chambered cylinder which contained the ignition cartridges. These could be fired once, each giving the operator 10 bursts of flame. In practice this gave 10 one-second bursts. It was also possible to spray fuel without igniting it. This allowed the operator to ensure the target had been adequately splashed with fuel before an ignited burst was fired.

At 64 pounds (29 kg) the flamethrower was considered heavy.

== Gallery ==
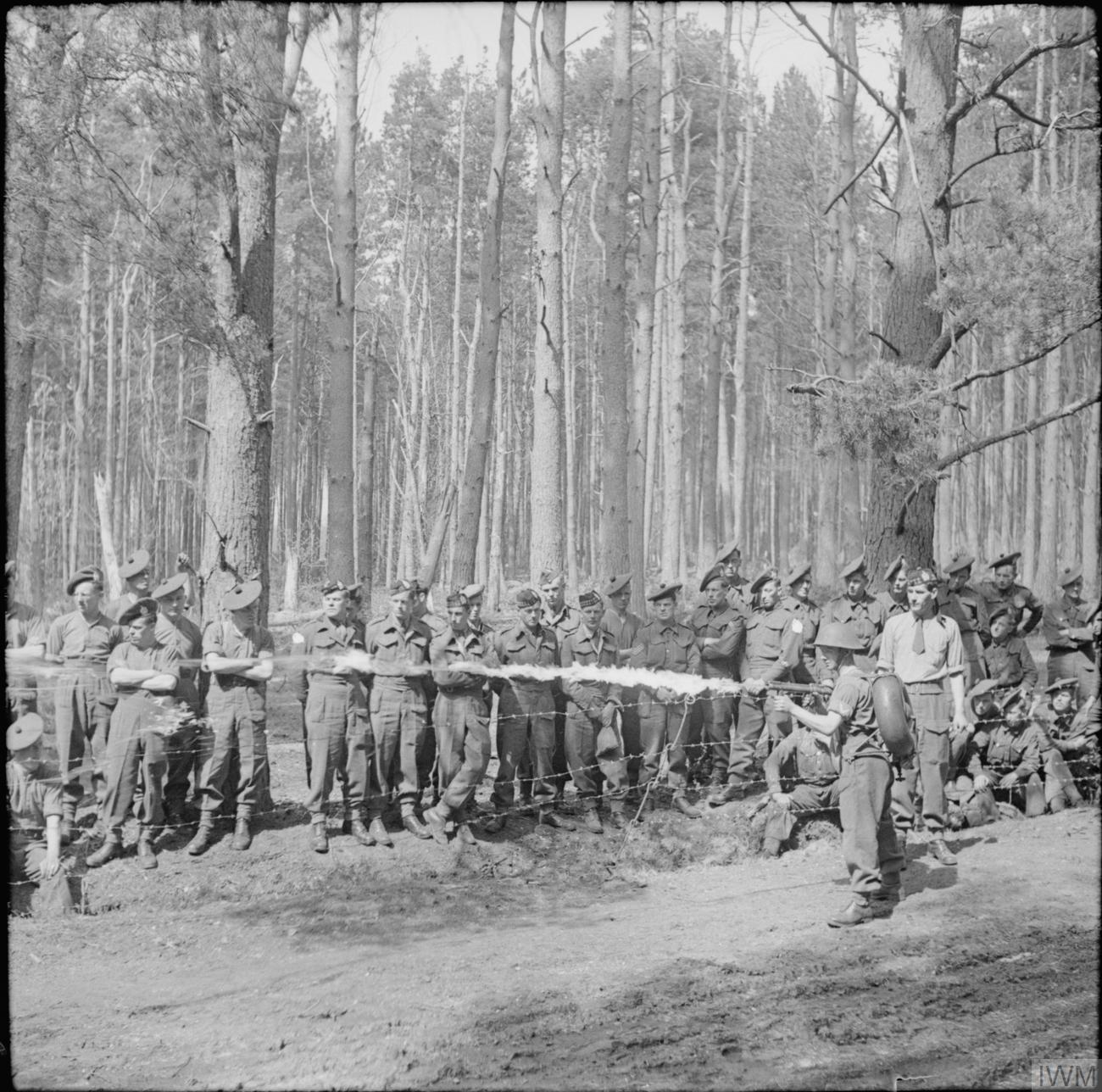
The Lifebuoy man-portable flamethrower being demonstrated to men of 1st Battalion, King's Own Scottish Borderers, Denmead, Hampshire, 29 April 1944.

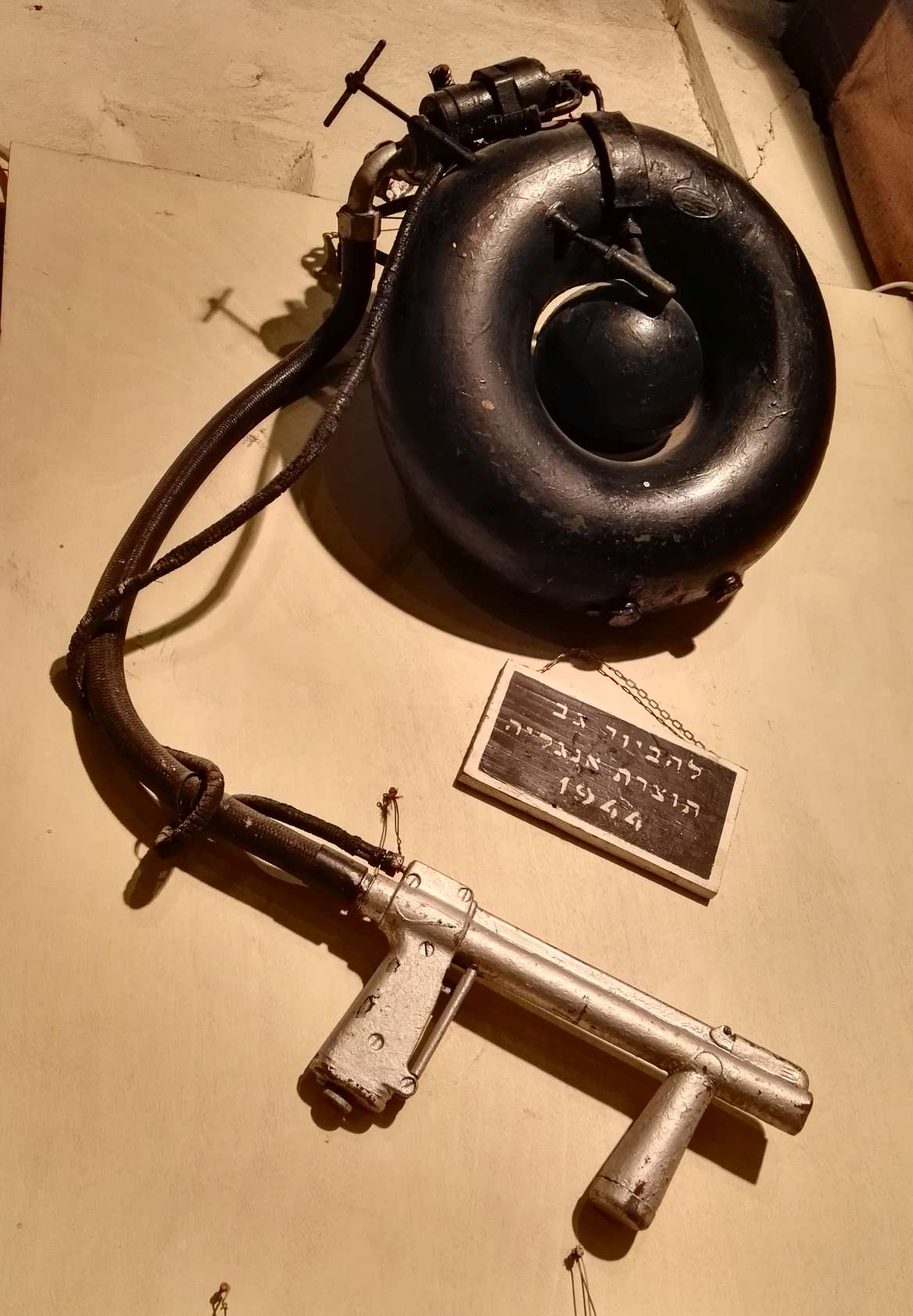
A Flamethrower Portable, No 2 in the Israel Defense Forces History Museum, Tel Aviv, Israel (September 2015)

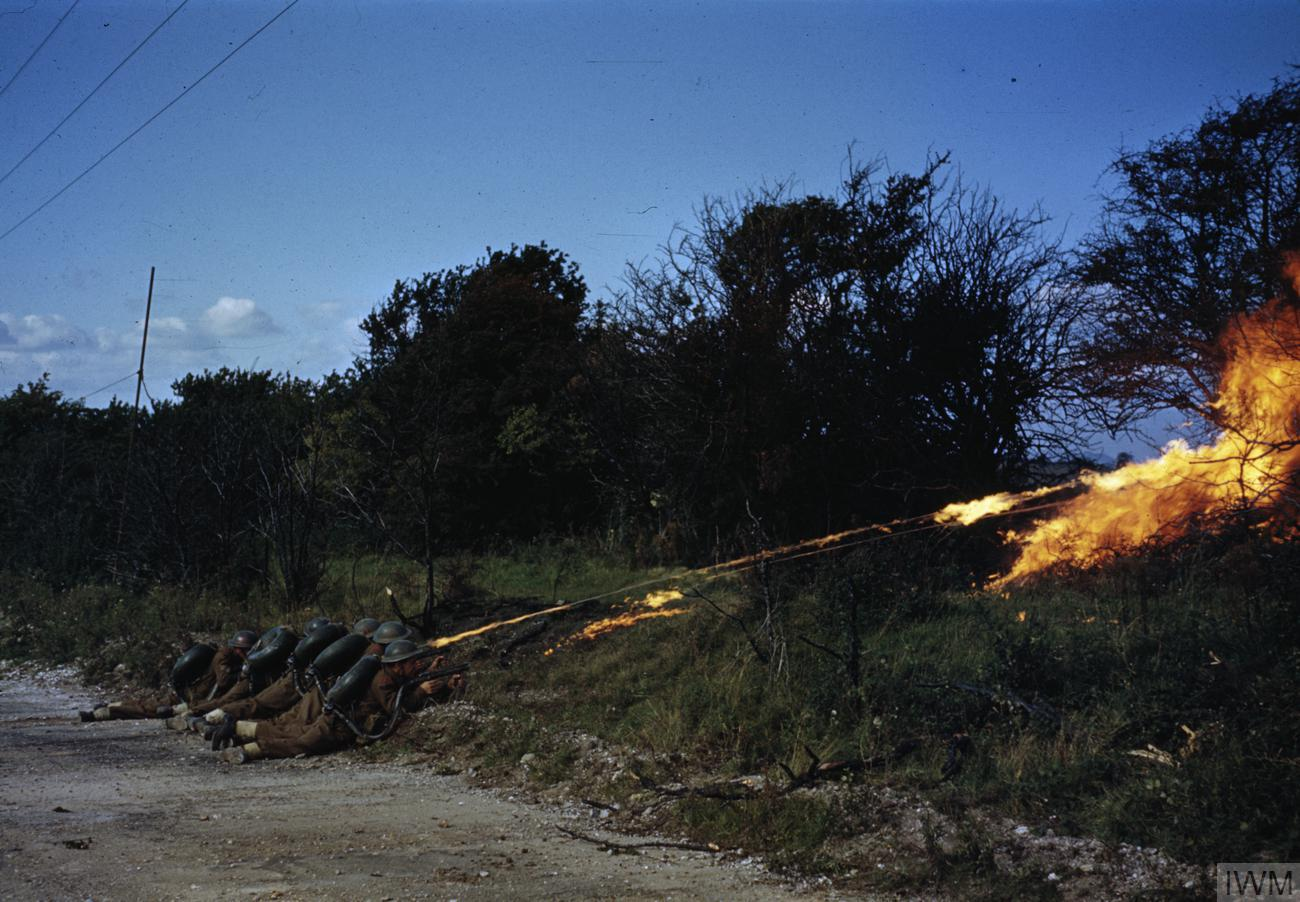
A Life Buoy flamethrower in action. August 1944.

== See also ==
- List of flamethrowers
