= Richard Fiedler =

German scientist

Richard Fiedler was a German scientist who invented the modern flamethrower, a weapon that projects a stream of nitrogen. He submitted evaluation models of his Flammenwerfer to the German Army (German Empire) in 1901. The most significant model submitted was a man-portable device, consisting of a vertical single cylinder 4 feet (1.2 m) long, horizontally divided in two, with pressurized gas in the lower section and flammable oil in the upper section. On depressing a lever the propellant gas forced the flammable oil into and through a rubber tube and over a simple igniting wick device in a steel nozzle. The weapon projected a jet of fire and enormous clouds of smoke some 20 yards (18 m). It was a single-shot weapon - for burst firing, a new igniter section was attached each time it was used for battle or other uses of any sorts. It was first used on the western front both by the Central Powers and the Entente.

It was used extensively in World War II by both Allied and Axis troops.

== Biography ==
Prior to the First World War, Fiedler studied engineering and worked as an engineer in Berlin. The development of the flame thrower resulted from his focus on nozzles for spraying liquids.

Fiedler originally performed a trick called "Brennender See" (Burning Lake) at festivals in Berlin-Weißensee. The trick entailed pouring a flammable liquid onto a water surface and setting it on fire. A first flamethrower patent was granted in 1901, and Fiedler turned to the German army who granted him financial support for continuing development of the device. In 1905, he presented his flamethrower to the Preußisches Ingenieurs-Komitee (Prussian engineering committee) at the Garde-Pionier-Bataillon in Berlin and received suggestions for improving the device.

Independently of Fiedler, Bernhard Reddemann (1870–1938) had also begun developing flamethrowers, prompted by reports of kerosene pumps that the Japanese had used against bunkers in the siege of Port Arthur. Fiedler and Reddemann met for the first time in 1908 and cooperated at the onset of the First World War on further developing the flamethrower. Reddemann advanced to the rank of major of the Pioniere (pioneers), was chief of the firefighters of Breslau and Leipzig and was the author of monographs on firefighting. After the war, he wrote a book on the history of the flamethrower.

Fiedler founded the Fiedler Flammenapparate G.m.b.H. (Fiedler Flame Devices, limited liability company), which he managed as director until 1917. His successors were to be Hauptmann (Captain) Arthur von Steynitz, Kaufmann (merchant) Arthur Bock and Kaufmann (merchant) Kurt Mayen. Fiedler was granted 11 German patents on flamethrowers, from 1901 until 1918, the last one being for an airplane flamethrower.
