= Regulation of flamethrowers in the United States =

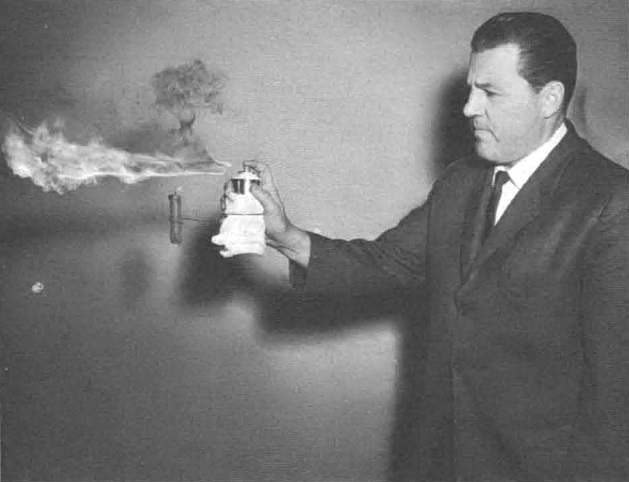
FBI Lieutenant Oliver R. Bailey demonstrating use of an improvised spray can flamethrower in 1964

In the United States, flamethrowers are broadly legal for personal ownership and use. California requires a permit for the possession of a flamethrower, and only Maryland has outright banned their ownership and use. No federal laws exist regarding flamethrowers, as they are not defined as weapons under the National Firearms Act. The United States is a signatory of the Convention on Certain Conventional Weapons, protocol III of which limits military use of flamethrowers; this does not extend to civilian use.

Beginning in 2015, several companies began selling flamethrowers to civilians. This brought increased interest in their regulation, with unsuccessful attempts to regulate flamethrowers at both the federal and state level as of 2022. Proponents of regulation have highlighted the potential dangers of civilian use of flamethrowers, while opponents have identified legitimate uses and pointed to the nearly nonexistent record of flamethrower incidents in the United States.

== History of civilian use of flamethrowers ==
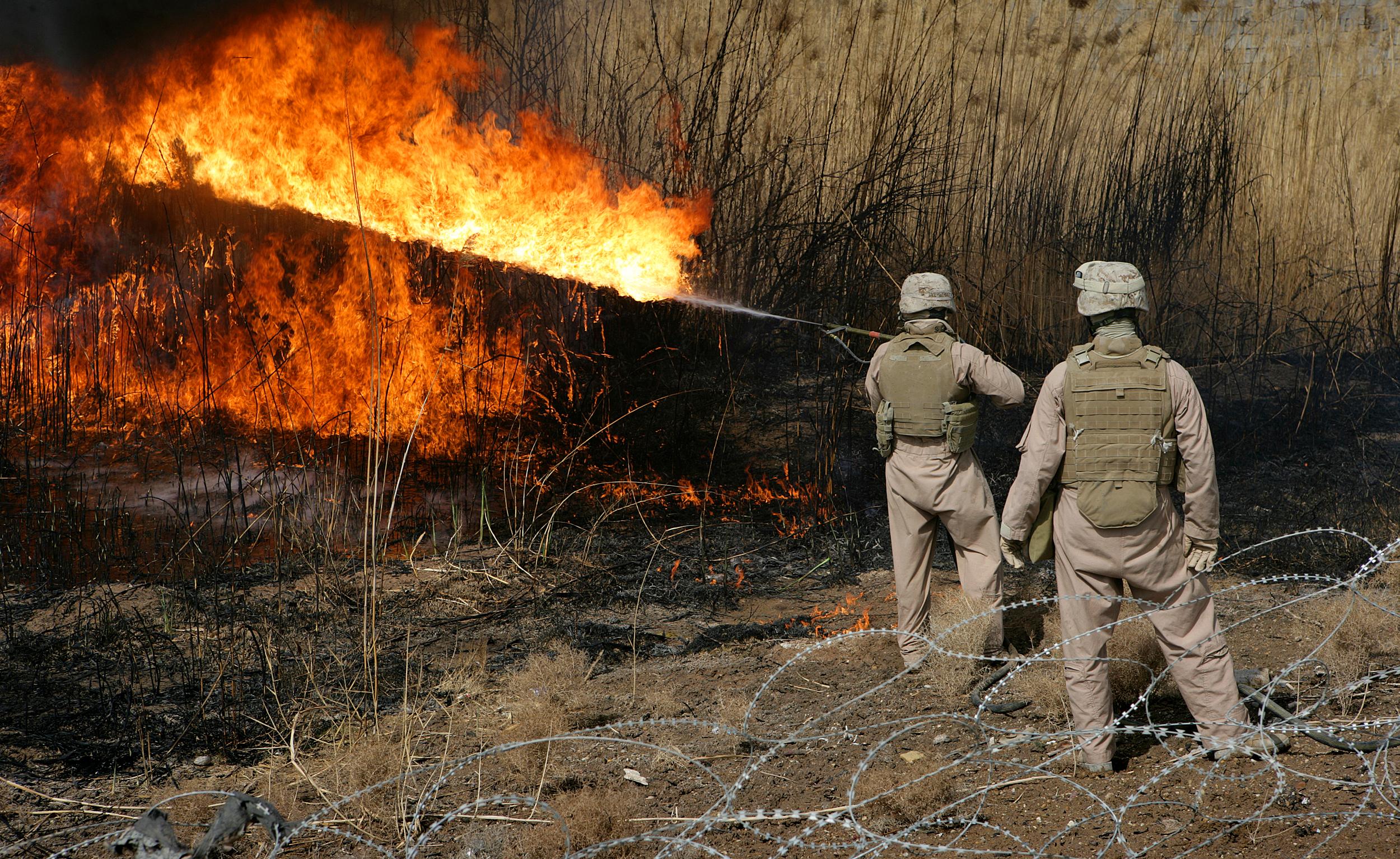
Flamethrowers can be used to clear brush, as demonstrated by United States Marine Corps personnel in Fallujah, Iraq in 2008. International agreements ban the United States from using flamethrowers in combat.

Until 2015, flamethrowers marketed to civilians were largely nonexistent in the United States; the only flamethrowers available were M1 and M2 flamethrowers of World War II vintage. Two startup companies began producing and selling flamethrowers for civilian use in the United States in 2015, Cleveland-based Throwflame (originally known as XMatter) and Detroit-based Ion Productions Team. While acknowledging many purchasers wanted flamethrowers simply for fun, both companies have identified genuine civilian uses of flamethrowers, including for controlling brush and for starting controlled burns, as well as melting snow and ice. One of Throwflame's founders reported in 2015 that "Seventy percent of our market is farmers using flamethrowers agriculturally". Ion Productions Team has stated its flamethrowers are not marketed or intended for personal defense.

The U.S. Consumer Product Safety Commission issued guidance on the safe operation of flamethrowers in 2018. Guidance creator Joseph Galbo commented that "While CPSC had received no reports of flamethrower injuries, it seemed prudent to put out safety tips for the public" following the introduction of more powerful civilian flamethrowers that year. In the same year, The Boring Company introduced a model of flamethrower, of weaker power than the two models introduced by other companies in 2015, named the Not-A-Flamethrower. This flamethrower brought increased attention to the more powerful flamethrowers produced by Throwflame and Ion Productions Team, which both told the Los Angeles Times that they had seen an increase in flamethrower sales in 2018.

Several instances of the Not-A-Flamethrower have been seized during seizures of illegal drugs and weapons by law enforcement, both in the United States and Canada. Improvised flamethrowers, described as based on instructions related to the Not-A-Flamethrower, have also been seized from far-right extremists in the United States.

== Existing regulations ==
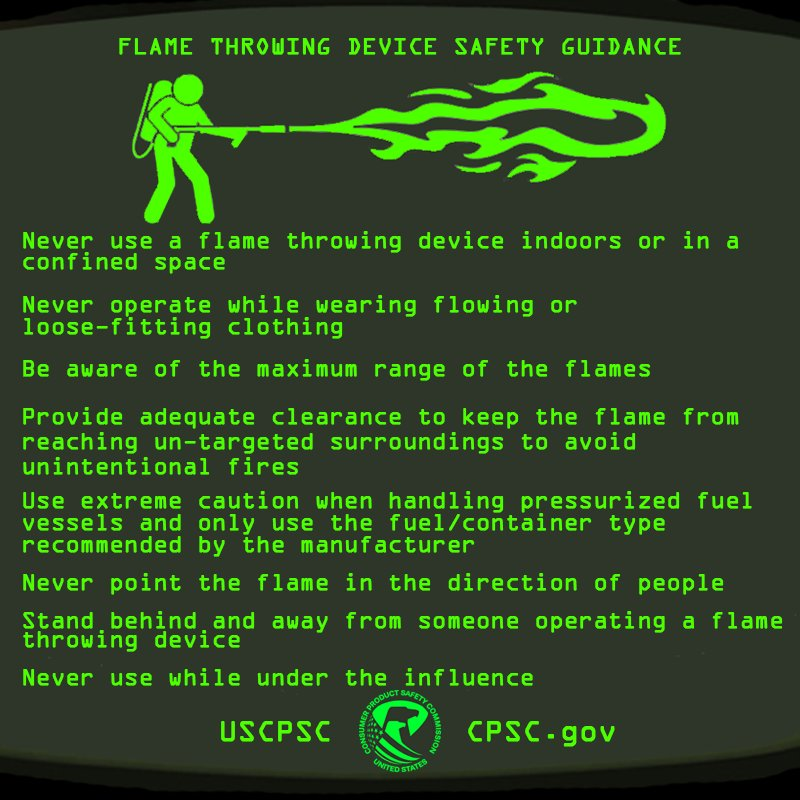
Safety guidelines for civilian use of flamethrowers, published by the U.S. Consumer Product Safety Commission in 2018

The United States became party to the Convention on Certain Conventional Weapons, an international treaty which partially restricts the military use of incendiary weapons, including flamethrowers, in 1983. However, the convention does not regulate the use of flamethrowers outside of military applications.

Legality of flamethrower ownership in the United States Legal Legal with permit Banned

Maryland is the sole U.S. state to entirely ban flamethrowers. Possessing and/or using a flamethrower in Maryland is punishable by a US$250,000 fine and/or up to 25 years imprisonment. Flamethrowers are also heavily restricted in California, but permits may be acquired for their use in limited circumstances, primarily in the production and filming of movies and TV shows. Specifically, California bans "any non-stationary and transportable device designed or intended to emit or propel a burning stream of combustible or flammable liquid a distance of at least 10 feet" without a permit from a fire marshal. This definition excludes the flamethrower produced by The Boring Company, as this device does not exceed the distance limit or project a stream of flammable liquid. In the other 48 states and the District of Columbia there are no state or federal level restrictions on their use or possession, though some municipalities regulate them.

The United States Bureau of Alcohol, Tobacco, Firearms and Explosives (ATF) does not define flamethrowers as weapons as they are not included in the National Firearms Act, and states that regulating them is outside of the agency's purview. Using or displaying a flamethrower in a National Park is not allowed and could result in charges for causing unrest, according to then-Regional Chief Park Ranger of the National Capitol Region William Reynolds.

== Attempts at state and federal legislation ==
In 2015, Representative Eliot Engel introduced the "Flamethrowers? Really?" Act in the 114th Congress, which would regulate flamethrowers identically to machine guns, which have long been largely illegal for civilians in the United States. This bill was referred to the Subcommittee on Crime, Terrorism, Homeland Security, and Investigations, but no further action was taken on it. Ironically, the prospect of potentially banning flamethrowers increased awareness of their legality, with Ion Productions Team's CEO telling Ars Technica in 2015, "We've received a large amount of support from police, fire, our customers, and interested parties regarding keeping them legal." The bill never made it out of committee in the 114th Congress.

Representative Engel introduced the bill again in the 116th Congress. At the time, a former employee of the ATF pointed out that in order for flamethrowers to be federally regulated, Congress would first have to legally change the definition of what counts as a firearm. Under the Presidency of Donald Trump, amending firearms laws was seen as a non-starter, eliminating any chance of a bill regulating flamethrowers nationally becoming law.

New York state senator John Brooks introduced a bill in the State Senate in 2019 which would criminalize the recreational use of flamethrowers, while permitting use "for agricultural, construction, or historical collection purposes." As of March 2022, this bill is in the Rules Committee and appears to be stalled.

In California, assemblyman Miguel Santiago has voiced support for introducing legislation which would ban the flamethrower produced by The Boring Company, stating that "Absolutely no public good could come from the sale of this tool". He followed through on this by introducing AB-1949 Explosives: flamethrowing devices in the 2017-2018 session of the California Legislature. This bill would have modified California's existing legislation to extend regulation to devices which emit a flame of at least 2 feet in length. The bill was ultimately held in committee and did not become law.

Some municipalities have also attempted to enact bans or restrictions on flamethrowers. At the behest of the city's mayor, the city council of Warren, Michigan, considered a ban on flamethrowers in 2015. The effort ended without any action taken, as the council noted that there had been no complaints made about flamethrowers.
