= M9 flamethrower =

M9 Flamethrower
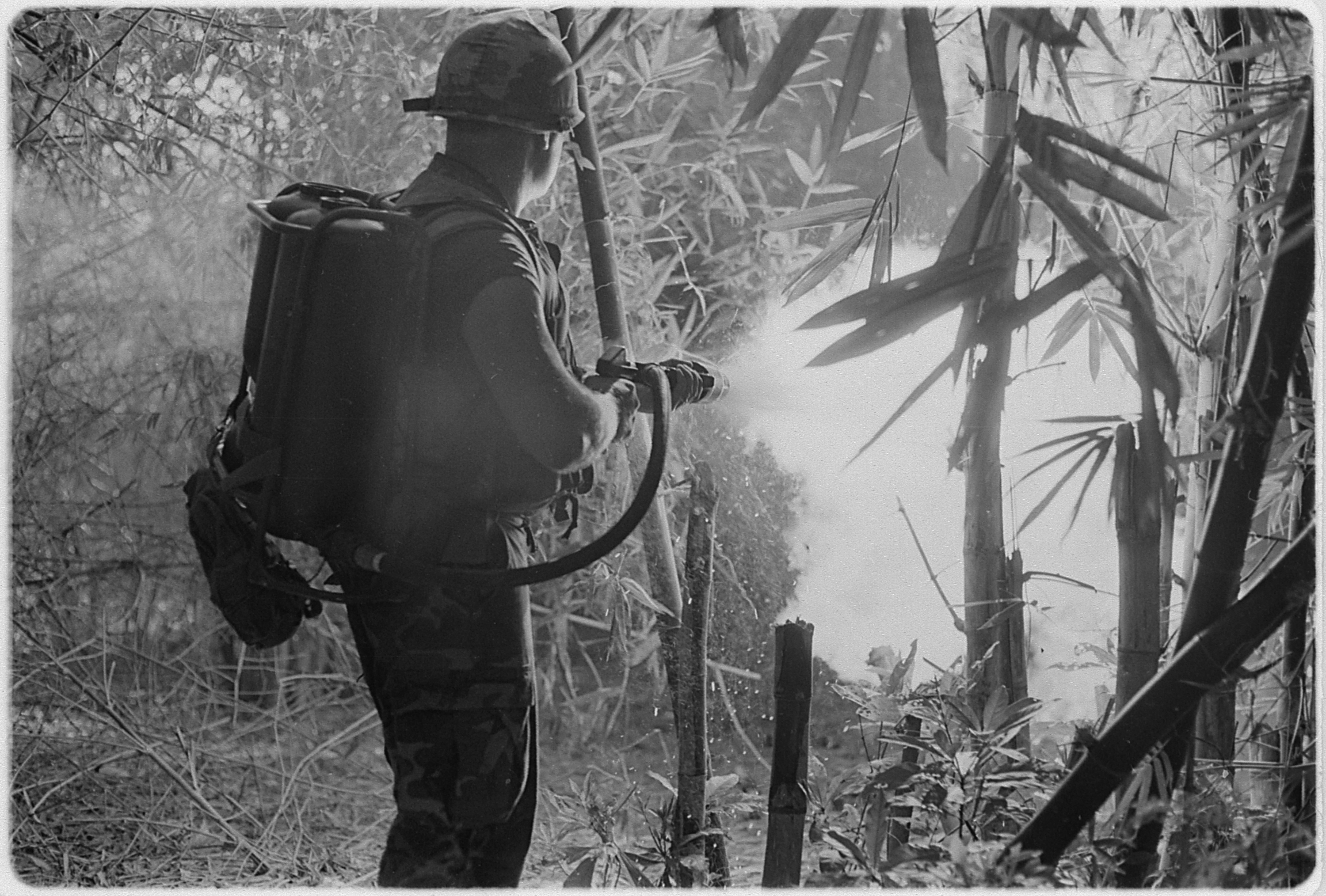
- M9 Flamethrower being used in Da Nang, Vietnam.
- Type: Flamethrower
- Place of origin: United States

Service history
- In service: 1960–1978
- Wars: Vietnam War

Production history
- Designer: U.S. Chemical Corps
- Designed: 1959–60
- No. built: Unknown
- Variants: M9-7, M9E1-7

Specifications
- Mass: 25 lb (11.3 kg) empty 52 lb (23.6 kg) filled
- Width: 20 in (51 cm)
- Height: 23 1/2 in (60 cm)
- Diameter: 9 in (23 cm)
- Crew: 1
- Rate of fire: Around 0.7 US gal (2.6 L) a second
- Effective firing range: 49–60 yd (45–55 m)
- Maximum firing range: 60 yd (55 m)
- Feed system: One, 4 1/4 US gal (16 L) Napalm/gasoline tank (fuel); One Nitrogen tank (propellant)
- Sights: None

The M9 flamethrower, officially designated: Flame Thrower, Portable, M9-7, was an American man-portable flamethrower that essentially replaced the earlier M2 flamethrower variants. The set consisted of the M9 backpack, the M8 quick-connect hose, and the newer M7 gun group. The M9-7 solved many of the problems associated with the M1 and M2 variants by reducing the overall mass and featuring a shorter gun group. It was the last flamethrower in U.S. service and was replaced with the M202 FLASH rocket-based incendiary system.

The M9 saw service in the Vietnam War and was initially deployed alongside M2A1-7 flamethrowers, but eventually replaced nearly all M2 variants by 1963. Like its predecessors, the M9 effectively fought dug-in enemies since the flames could scorch or asphyxiate them. The flare-based ignition systems of the M2-2 and M7 meant that the flamethrower could function in the harshest conditions. Each flamethrower squad featured at least one soldier with a modified pack frame for carrying up to four pressure tanks. It is unknown how many M9s were manufactured as the Army destroyed most records and equipment to prevent dissemination to the public as surplus gear. The XM202 project was carried out to replace the M9 by the 1980s completely.

== M9 Backpack ==
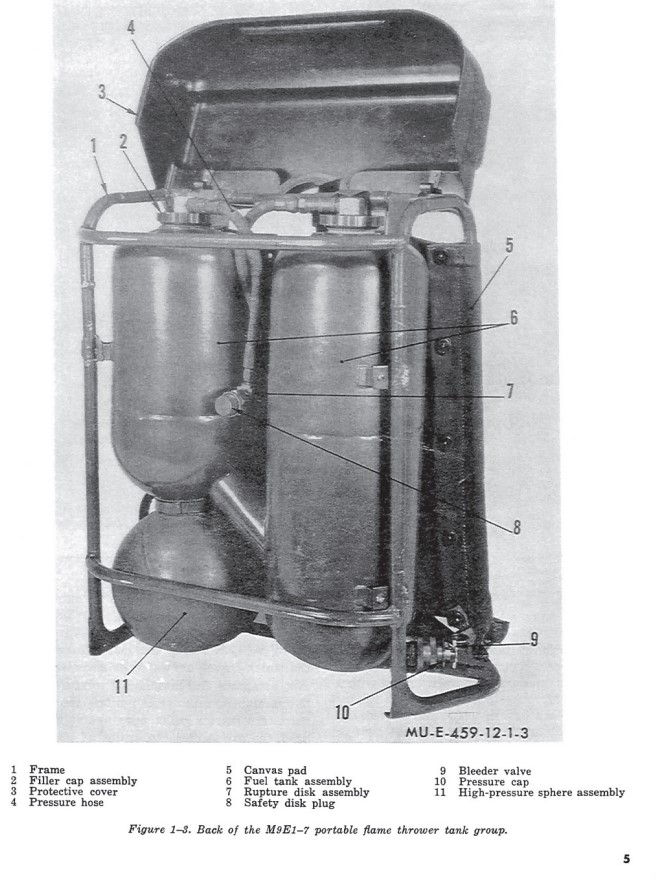
Diagram of Vietnam War Era M9E1-7 flamethrower tank group

After several weight reduction attempts to the original M2 flamethrowers, the U.S. began developing a new and improved flamethrower system. The M9 backpack featured a reduced weight compared to previous U.S. flamethrowers. This was accomplished by adjusting the fuel tank design, using lighter aluminum tanks, and using a spherical pressure tank similar to the British "lifebuoy" pressure tank design. The pack featured an encompassing metal frame to protect the tanks and to allow the operator to use a pseudo backpack to conceal it. Later developments on the system led to the M9E1 backpack with an even more significant weight reduction.

Comparison of U.S. Portable Flamethrowers
	M1A1	M2A1	M8	M9E1
Mass (full)	70 lb (32 kg)	68 lb (31 kg)	26 1/2 lb (12.0 kg)	52 lb (24 kg)
Capacity	4 7/10 US gal (18 L)	4 US gal (15 L)	2 US gal (7.6 L)	4 1/4 US gal (16 L)
Range	47 yd (43 m)	43 yd (39 m)	71 yd (65 m)	60 yd (55 m)

== M7 Gun Group ==
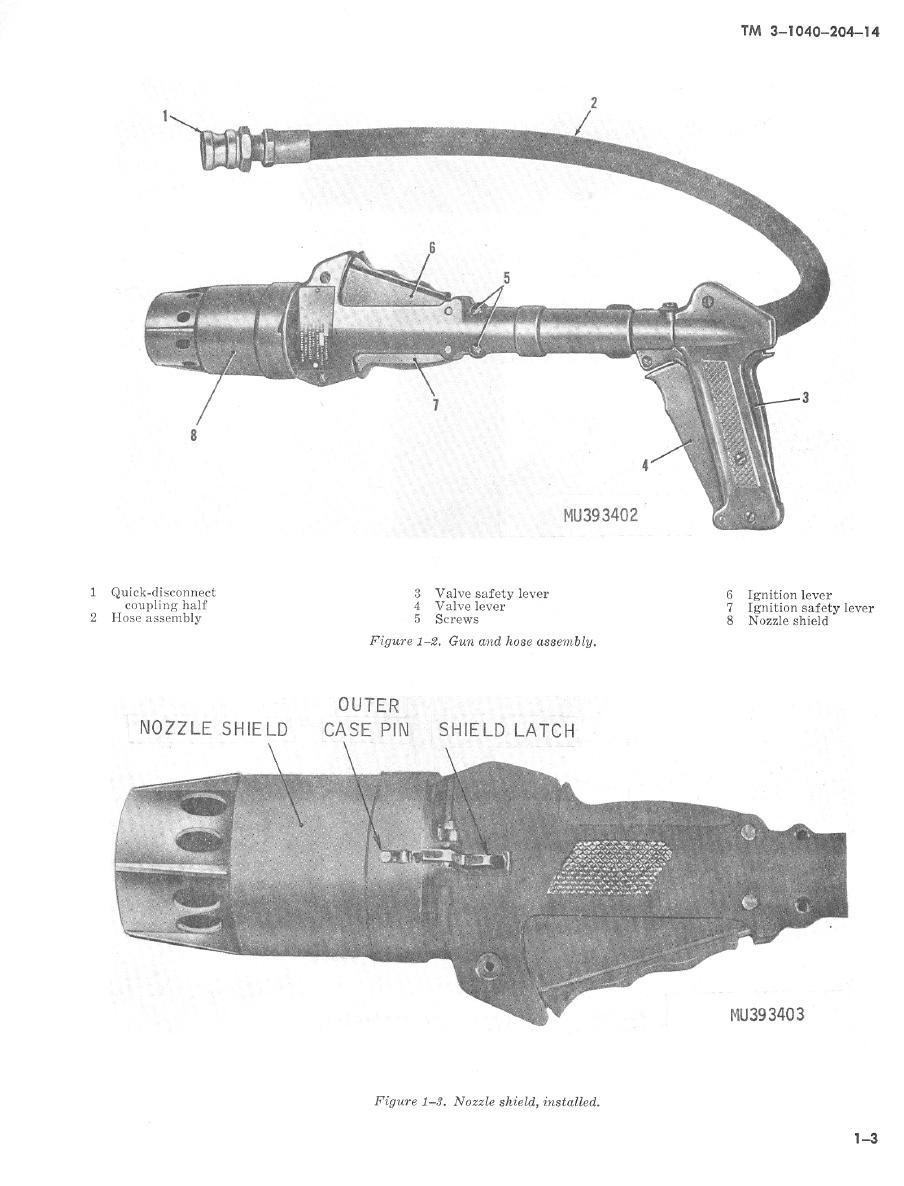
Diagram of M7 gun group configured for M2A1 flamethrowers from U.S. Army training manual

Developed before the M9 backpack, the M7 replaced the earlier M2-2 gun group of the M2 flamethrower variants. It was shorter than the M2-2, featured a grip safety for the igniter, and moved the ignition assembly to the sides of the barrel for a more streamlined design. Like its predecessor, the M7 was based on designs from agricultural spray guns to increase effective range without requiring a long barrel by using fins to stabilize the flow. The gun group was used both on reconfigured M2A1 backpacks, designated the Flame Thrower, Portable, M2A1-7, and the M9 backpacks. Many M7s were destroyed at the end of the Vietnam War, making them rare. As a result, many refurbished models have the M2-2 installed.

== ABC-M9-7 ==
During the production of U.S. flamethrowers, the Army had many repurposed for use as chemical dispersing devices in riot control. The systems were capable of using CS-1, CS-2, and oleoresin capsicum as the riot control agents. The M9 backpack variant was designated: Flame Thrower, Portable, ABC-M9-7.

== Experimental U.S. Flamethrowers ==
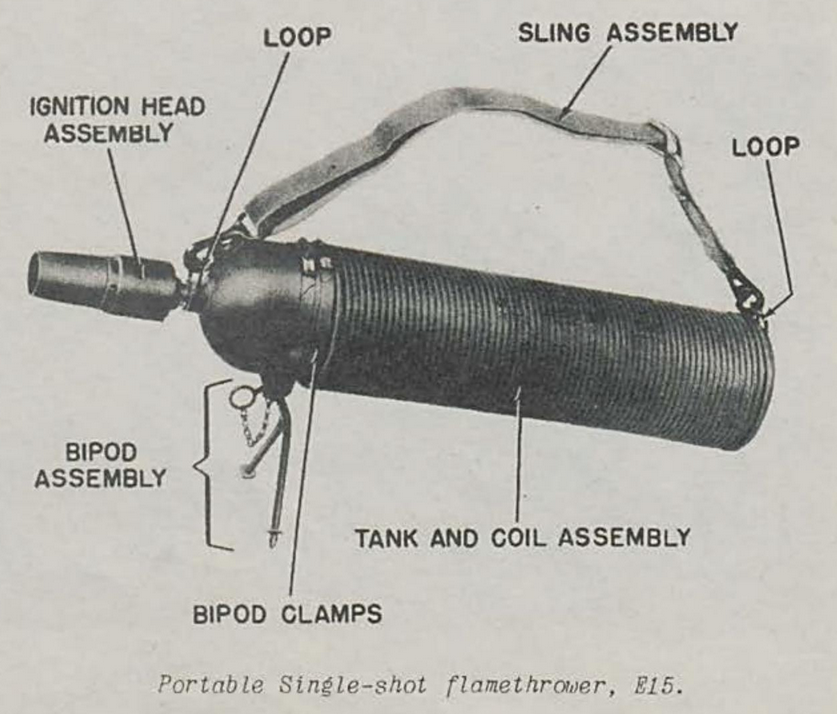
U.S. single-use flamethrower concept

Before developing the M9 flamethrower, the U.S. tested and developed several designs and prototypes, most of which never entered service.

- The Flame Thrower, Auxiliary, M3 entered service as a vehicle-mounted flamethrower, featuring a different ignition system from the man-portable ones.
- The Manifold, Portable Flame Thrower, E4 entered service as World War II ended. It was a manifold line able to connect multiple flamethrower packs and featured an extended E10R1 gun group.
- The M5 was developed based on the single-use flamethrower concepts pioneered by the Germans in World War II.
- The M8 was a prototype flamethrower designed to be fully handheld without needing a pack. It featured a long horseshoe-shaped tank system. An operator training technical manual was written for the M8. However, it did not see mass production.
