= M202 =

M202 or M-202 may refer to:

- Martin 2-0-2, one of the first modern airliners
- M202 FLASH, an American rocket launcher
