= 1A1 =

1A1 may refer to:

- Leopard 1A1, a German battle tank
- Ishapore 1A1, an Indian rifle
- L1A1 Self-Loading Rifle, a British rifle

== See also ==
- M1A1 (disambiguation)
