= M8 flamethrower =

M8 Flamethrower
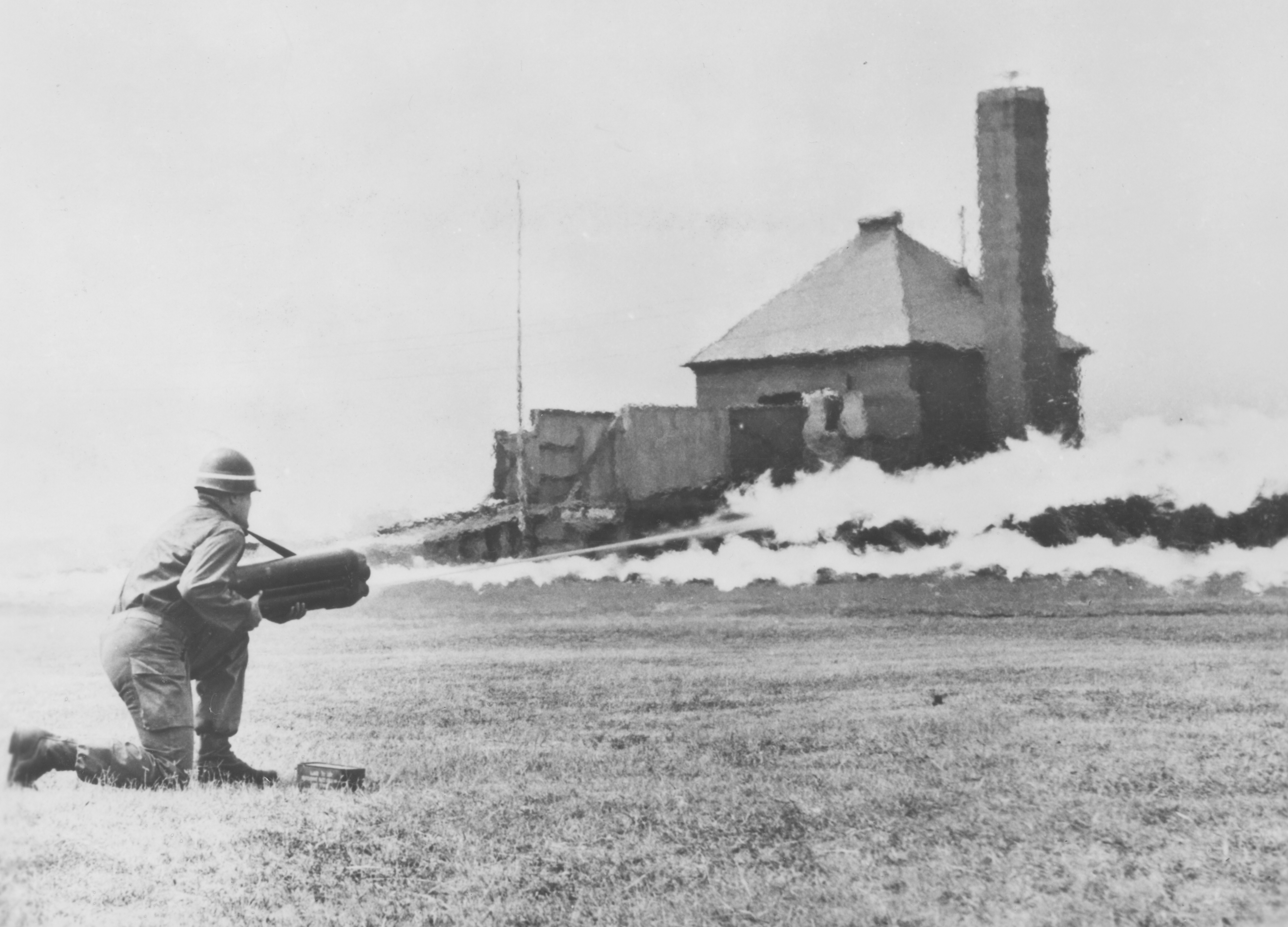
- M8 Flamethrower being used at testing range
- Type: Flamethrower
- Place of origin: United States

Service history
- In service: 1955–1965
- Wars: Vietnam War

Production history
- Designer: U.S. Chemical Corps
- Designed: 1953–55
- No. built: Unknown
- Variants: E30, M8

Specifications
- Mass: 13 lb (5.9 kg) empty 26 1/2 lb (12.0 kg) filled
- Length: 31 3/4 in (81 cm)
- Width: 20 in (51 cm)
- Height: 9 in (23 cm)
- Diameter: 3 1/2 in (8.9 cm)
- Crew: 1
- Rate of fire: Around 0.4 US gal (1.5 L) a second
- Effective firing range: 60–71 yd (55–65 m)
- Maximum firing range: 71 yd (65 m)
- Feed system: One, 2 US gal (7.6 L) Napalm/gasoline tank (fuel) One powder ignition charge
- Sights: None

The M8 flamethrower, officially designated: Flame Thrower Portable One-Shot, M8, was a single-shot flamethrower briefly adopted into U.S. service by airborne troops, but was never mass produced.

At the end of World War II, the Chemical Corps became interested in improving the man-portable flamethrower concept. They found two possibilities in design: an inexpensive flamethrower capable of being disposed after a single use or a compact flamethrower capable of being reloaded quickly. Early designs of these single use flamethrowers, such as the E15/E16, were inspired by the German einstoss-Fm.W.46 flamethrowers. Sometime in development they found that a 2 US gal (7.6 L) horseshoe-shaped tank with a powder ignition charge was sufficient. It was adopted into service by airborne troops with a technical manual written for it in March 1959. It was eventually replaced by the M9 flamethrowers.

== Design ==
The M8 featured a unique fiberglass horseshoe-shaped tank design that holds 2 US gal (7.6 L) of fuel. Inside the tank is a ball that functions as a piston when a powder charge is detonated, causing the fuel to be expelled. A smaller chamber is connected to the fuel tank and houses the powder charge for generating the required pressures and igniting the fuel as its expelled. The ignition is activated by moving a lever on the right side of the flamethrower with the operator's thumb. As a result of using a powder charge, the M8 was capable of only producing a single shot per refuel. This propellant system is similar in function to the Soviet LPO-50 and Chinese Type 74 flamethrowers. The M8 was capable of being fired by hand or by a remote trigger lanyard system, functioning as an emplaced flamethrower. Due to the simple design, the M8 could be disposed of after a single use without being a liability, although they were reusable and could be refueled.

== Gallery ==
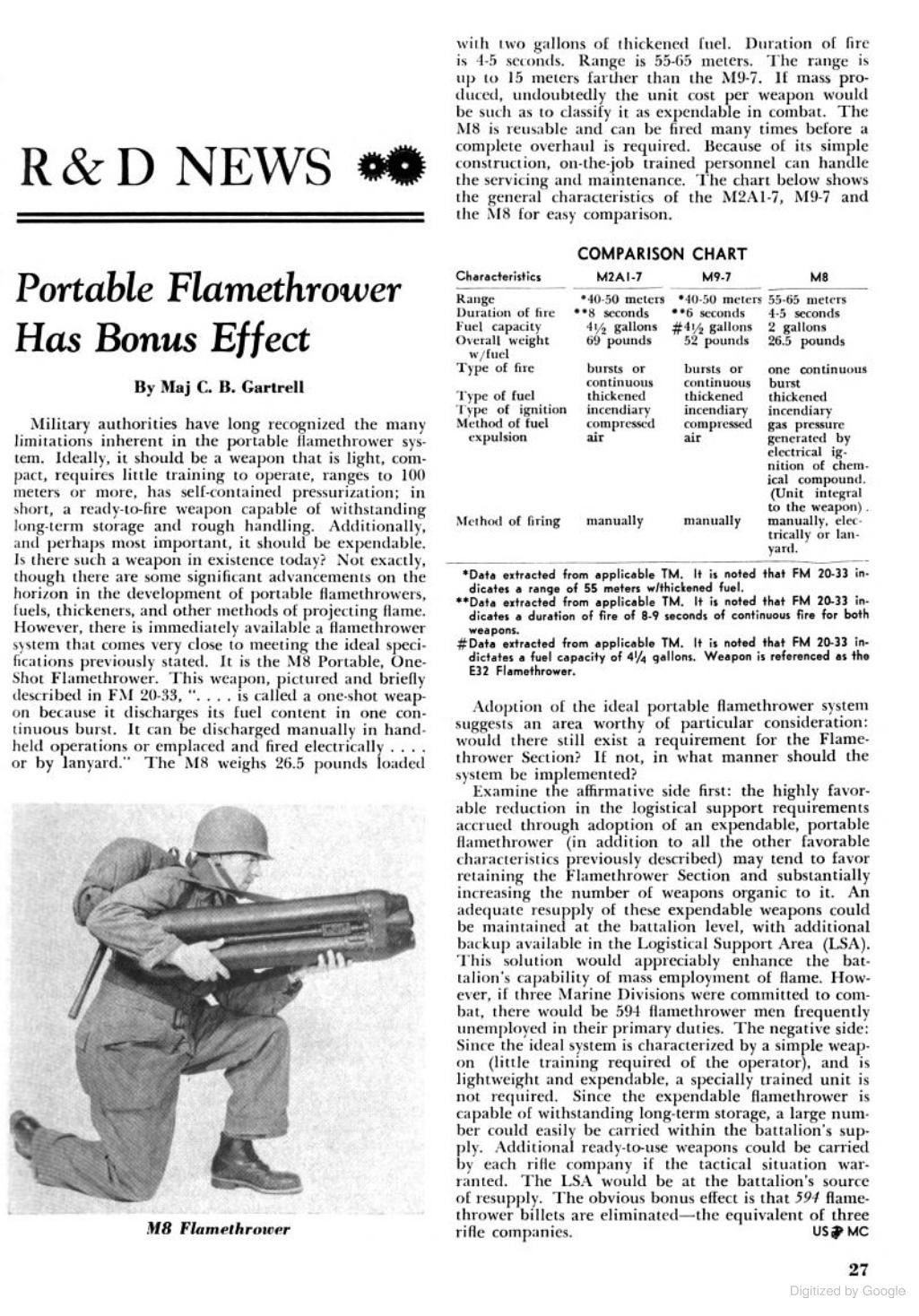
Article in the Marine Corps Gazette about the M8 flamethrower

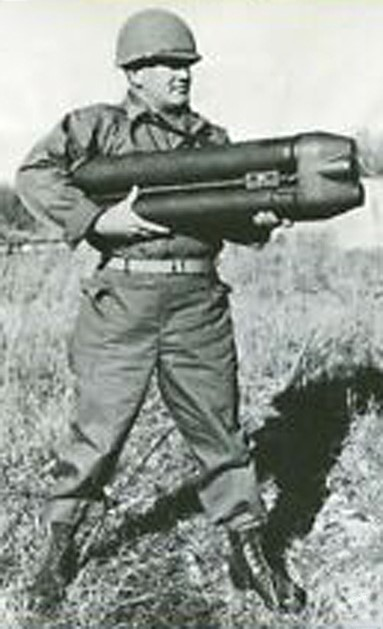
Portrait of soldier with M8 flamethrower

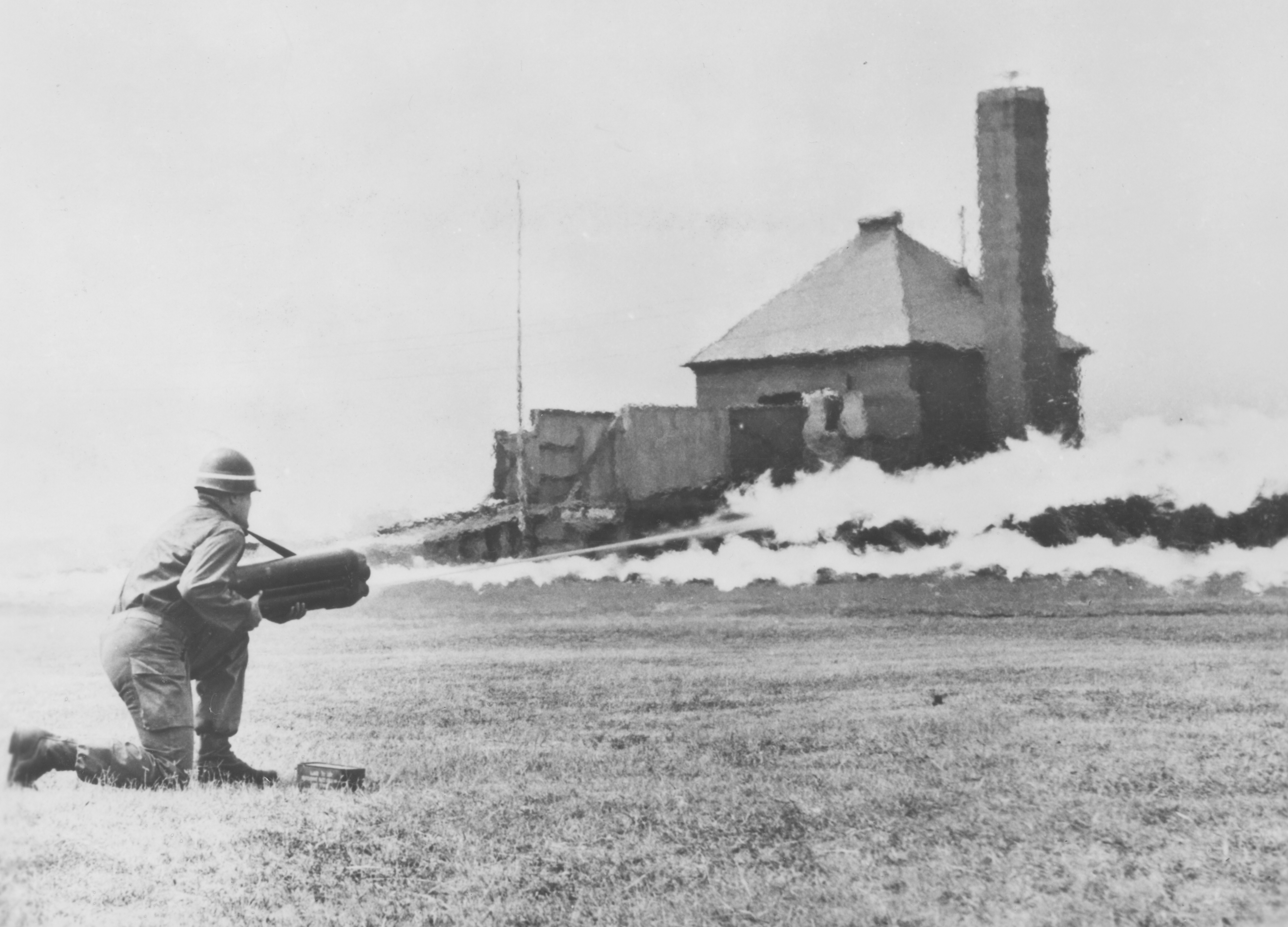
M8 Flamethrower being used at testing range

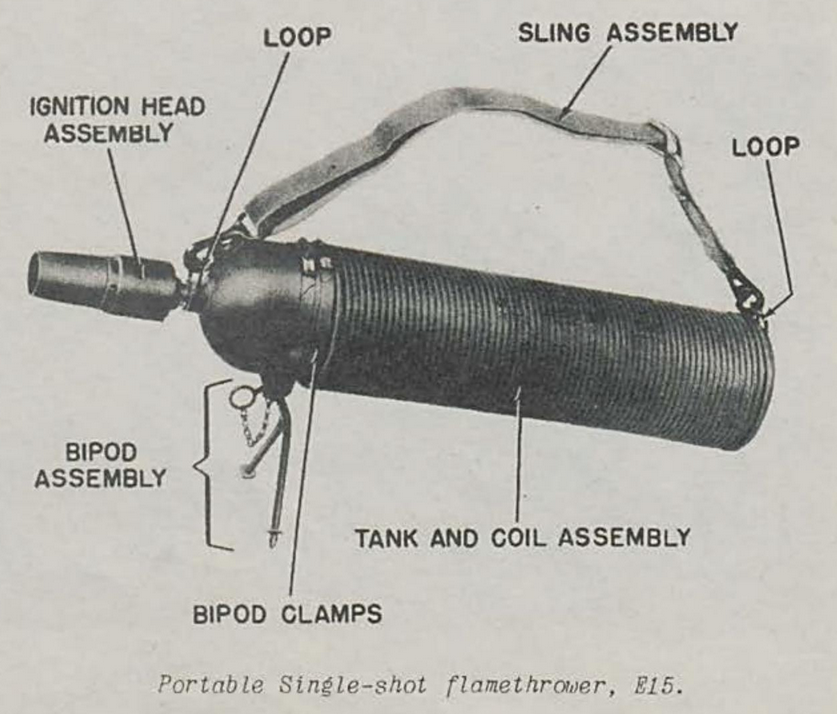
E15 prototype flamethrower 1 shot
