= M1A1 =

M1A1, M1-A1, M1 A1, or M-1A1 may refer to:

== Military ==
- M1A1 Abrams, a variant of the M1 Abrams battle tank
- M1A1 carbine, a variant of the M1 carbine with a folding stock for paratroopers
- M1A1 Flamethrower, an anti-personnel weapon
- M1A1 bazooka, a variant of the bazooka rocket launcher
- Thompson M1A1, a variant of the Thompson submachine gun
- M1A1, an anti-aircraft 90 mm gun
- M1A1, a U.S. Army bangalore torpedo used in World War II
- M1A1, a variant of the M1 75mm pack howitzer (later renamed M116)

== Other uses ==
- M1A1, a port of the computer game Marathon
- "M1 A1", a song on the album Gorillaz by Gorillaz

== See also ==
- M1 to A1(M), an extension of the M1 motorway in Yorkshire, England
