= M202 FLASH =

Launcher, Rocket, 66mm, 4-Tube, M202
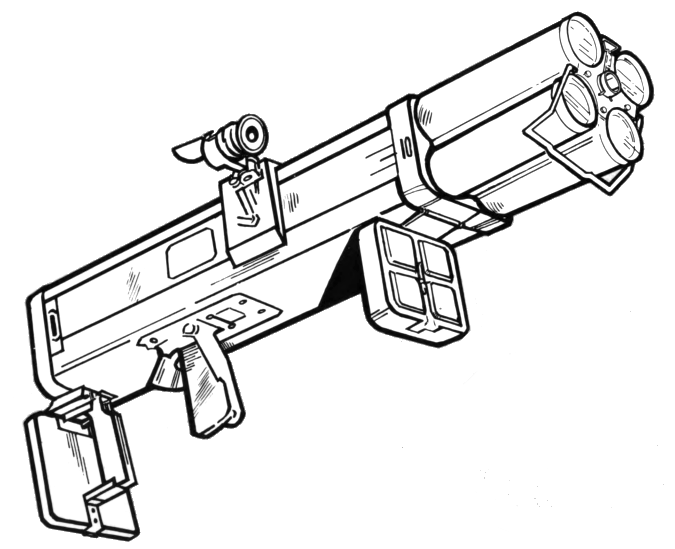
- Type: Multishot incendiary rocket launcher
- Place of origin: United States

Service history
- Used by: See Operators
- Wars: Vietnam War; Cambodian Civil War

Production history
- Designed: c. 1970
- Manufacturer: Northrop Corporation, Electro-Mechanical Division
- Produced: 1978
- Variants: M202, M202A1

Specifications
- Mass: 11.5 lb (5.22 kg) empty 26.6 lb (12.07 kg) loaded
- Length: 27 in (686 mm) closed 34.75 in (883 mm) extended
- Cartridge: M235 Incendiary TPA
- Caliber: 2.6 in (66 mm)
- Action: Single shot (each rocket has its own firing pin)
- Muzzle velocity: 375 ft/s (114 m/s)
- Effective firing range: 22 yd (20 m) minimum
- Maximum firing range: 820 yd (750 m) (area target); 219 yd (200 m) (point target)
- Feed system: 4 rocket clip
- Sights: Reflex

The M202 FLASH ("Flame Assault Shoulder") is an American rocket launcher manufactured by Northrop Corporation, designed to replace the World War II–vintage flamethrowers (such as the M1 and the M2) that remained the military's standard incendiary devices well into the 1980s. The XM202 prototype launcher was tested in the Vietnam War, as part of the XM191 system.

== History ==
The United States Army issued M202s as needed, with each rifle company's headquarters being authorized a single launcher, generally issued as one per rifle platoon. While vastly more lightweight than the M2 flamethrower it replaced, the weapon was still bulky to use and the ammunition suffered from reliability problems. As a result, the weapon had mostly been relegated to storage by the mid-1980s, even though it nominally remains a part of the U.S. Army arsenal.

In USMC service, the M202 was issued to dedicated teams of 0351 Assaultman at the battalion level. The Weapons Platoon's assault section contained three squads, each with a launcher team. With the introduction of the SMAW in the mid 1980s, the M202 was phased out and replaced by SMAW launchers.

The M202A1 has been among weapons listed on the inventory of U.S. units in the War in Afghanistan.

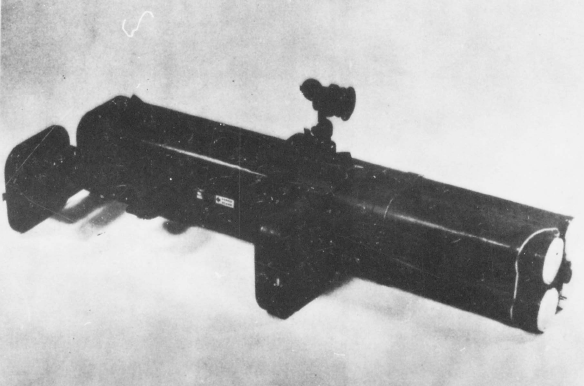
The XM191 MPFW

== Design ==
The M202A1 features four tubes that can load 66 mm incendiary rockets. The M74 rockets are equipped with M235 warheads, containing approximately 1.34 pounds (610 g) of an incendiary thickened pyrophoric agent (TPA).

TPA is triethylaluminum (TEA) thickened with polyisobutylene, in the presence of n-hexane, preventing spontaneous combustion after the warhead rupture. TEA, an organometallic compound, is pyrophoric and burns spontaneously at temperatures of 1600 °C (2912 °F) when exposed to air. It burns "white hot" because of the aluminum, much hotter than gasoline or napalm. The light and heat emission is very intense and can produce skin burns from some (close) distance without direct contact with the flame, by thermal radiation alone.

The XM96 was an M74-derived riot control round containing CS gas. This was trialed beginning around 1968, but never entered service.

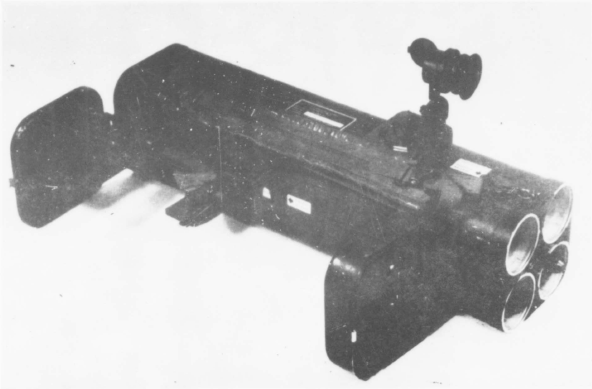
Opened M202

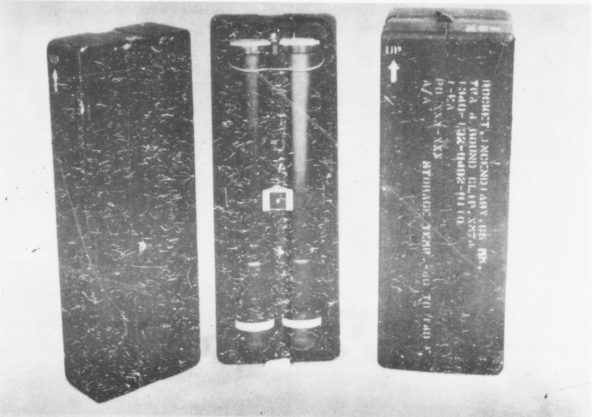
Component containing the M74

== Operation ==
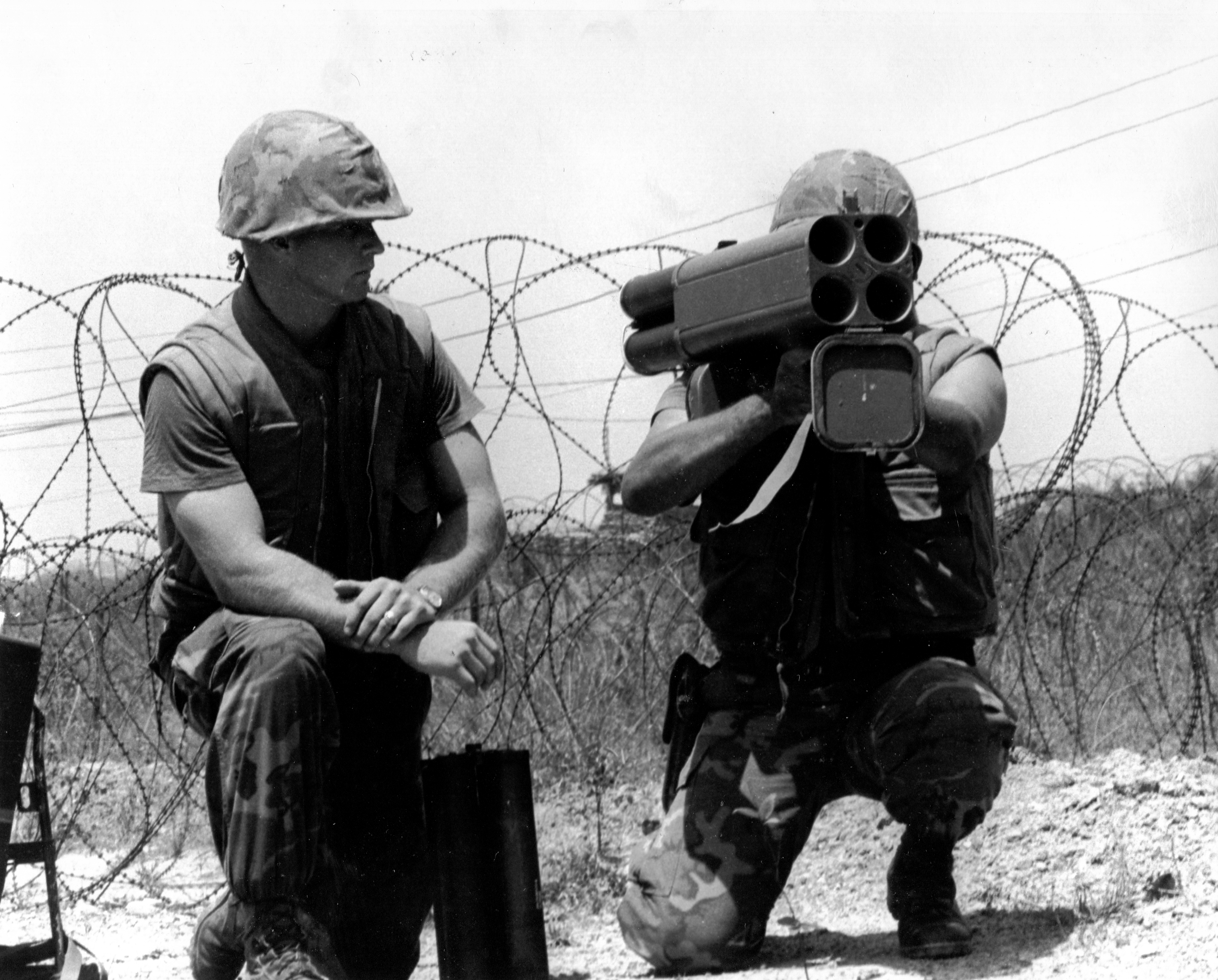
Marines prepare to test-fire an M202 in South Vietnam, 1970

The weapon is meant to be fired from the right shoulder, and can be fired from either a standing, crouching, or prone position. It is loaded with a clip which holds a set of four rockets together, which is inserted into the rear of the launcher and can be pushed past the launching position to enable the launcher to be carried while loaded more easily.

The M202A1 was rated as having a 50% chance of hit against the following targets at the noted ranges, assuming all four rockets were fired at the same time:

- Bunker aperture: 50 meters
- Window: 125 meters
- Weapons position or stationary vehicle: 200 meters
- Squad-sized troop formation: 500 meters

== Operators ==
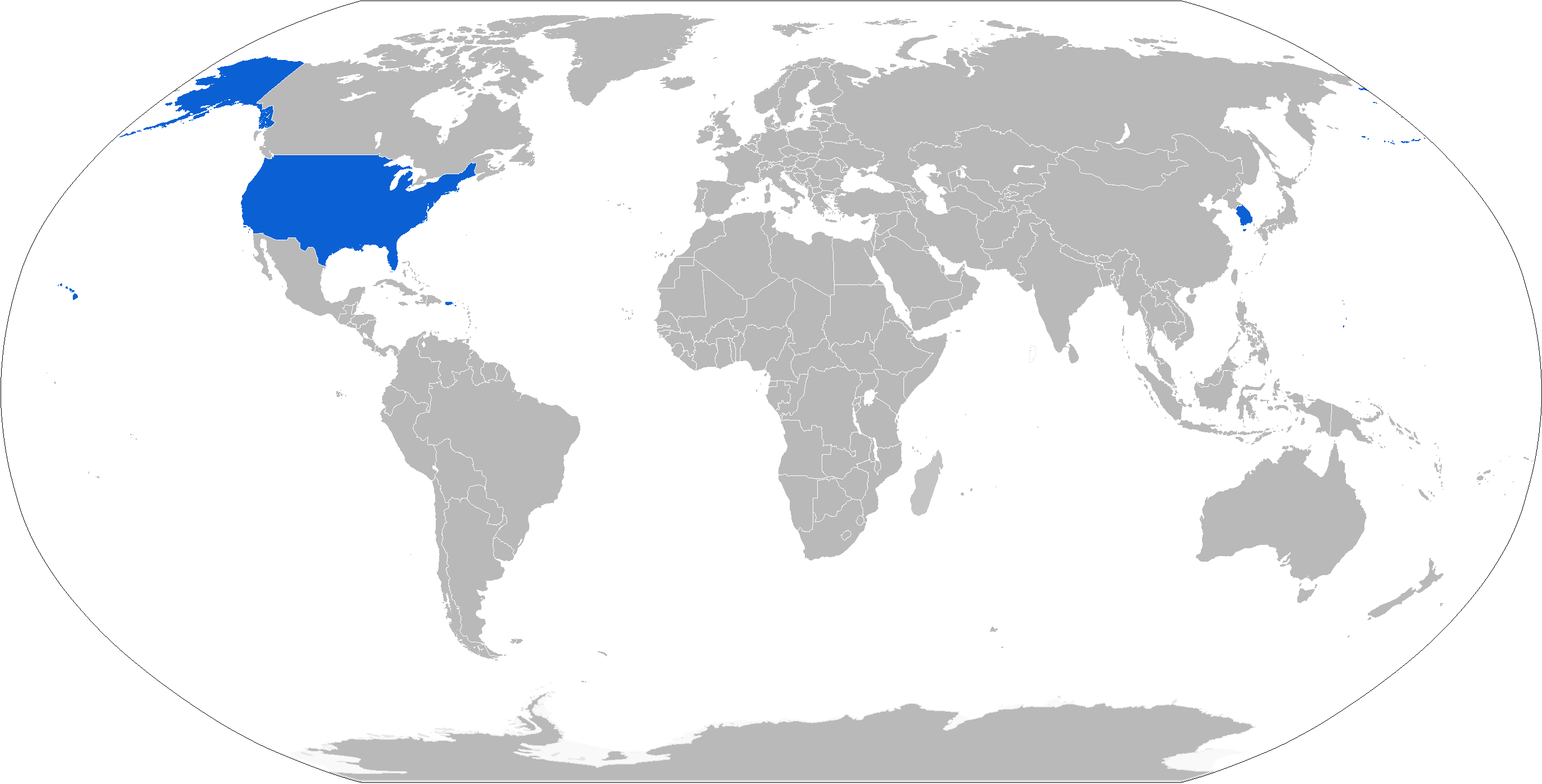
Map with M202 operators in blue

- United States: United States Army and United States Marine Corps
- Vietnam: PAVN Chemical Corps

== See also ==
- FHJ-84 – (China)
- RPO-A Shmel (Bumblebee) – (Soviet Union)
