= M2 flamethrower =

M2 Flamethrower
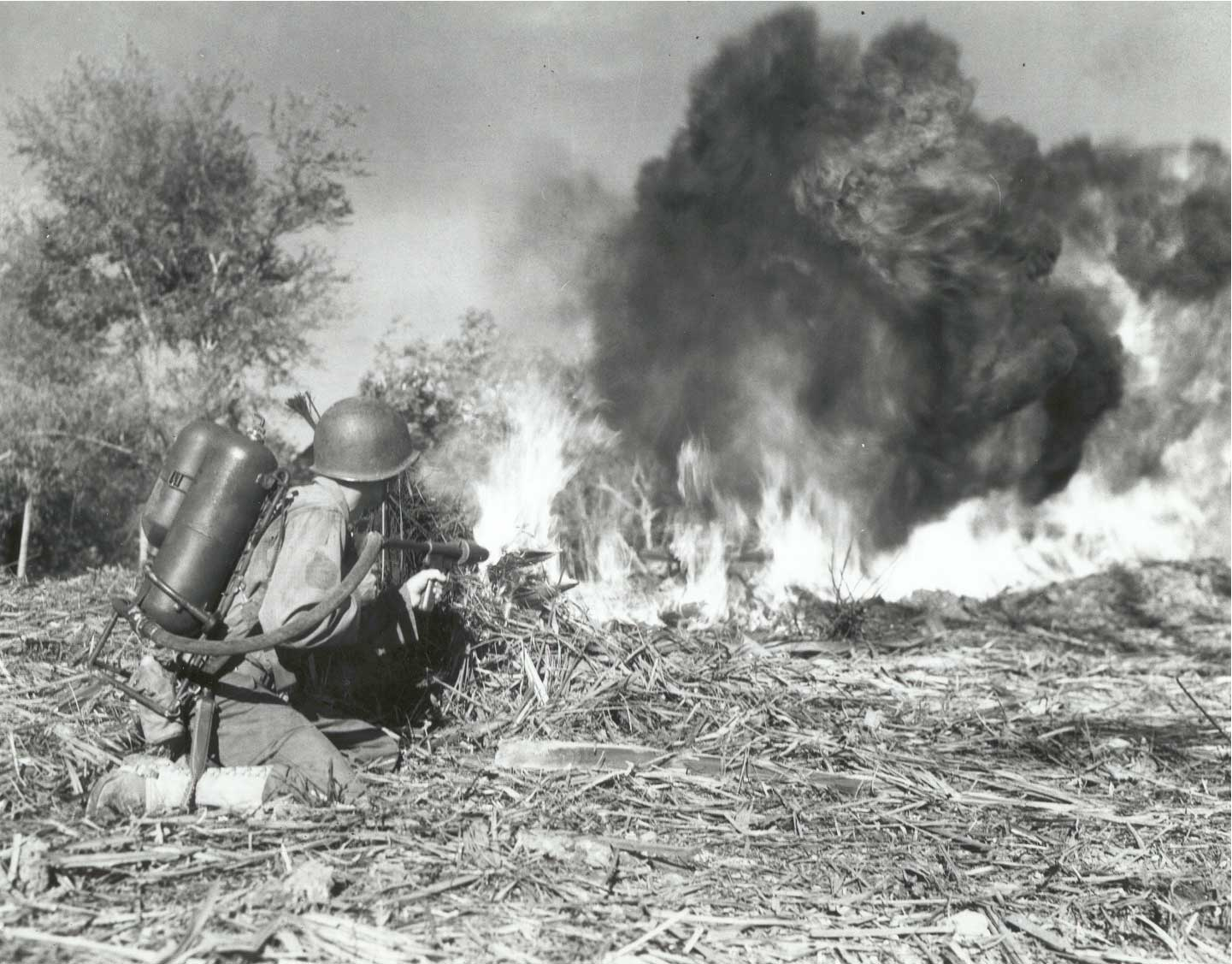
- A soldier from the 33rd Infantry Division uses an M2 flamethrower.
- Type: Flamethrower
- Place of origin: United States

Service history
- In service: 1944–1978
- Wars: World War II; Korean War; Vietnam War; Sino-Vietnamese War

Production history
- Designer: United States Army Chemical Warfare Service
- Designed: 1940–41
- No. built: Approx. 25,000 (M2-2)
- Variants: M2A1-2, M2A1-7

Specifications
- Mass: 43 lb (19.5 kg) empty 68 lb (30.8 kg) filled
- Crew: 1
- Rate of fire: Around 0.5 US gal (1.9 L) a second
- Effective firing range: 65 1/2 ft (20.0 m)
- Maximum firing range: 132 ft (40 m)
- Feed system: Two, 2 US gal (7.6 L) Napalm/gasoline tanks (fuel); One Nitrogen tank (propellant)
- Sights: None

United States Marines demonstrate an M2 flamethrower (2012)

The M2 flamethrower was an American, man-portable, backpack flamethrower that was used in World War II, the Korean War, and the Vietnam War. The M2 was the successor to the M1 and M1A1 flamethrowers. Although its burn time was around 7 seconds long, and the flames were effective around 20–40 meters, it was still a useful weapon. With the arrival of flamethrower tanks, the need for flamethrower-carrying infantrymen to expose themselves to enemy fire had been greatly reduced.

Though some M2s were sold off, the majority were scrapped.

== Combat use ==
=== Second World War ===
The M2 flamethrower saw combat use in the Pacific theater, being deployed to combat strongly fortified and entrenched Japanese positions. Following the success with the M1 flamethrower, the M2 was developed and put into combat use in 1943. Towards the end of the conflict, later models of the M2 were equipped with the fuel-thickening agent known as napalm.

=== Vietnam War ===
The improved M2A1-7 flamethrower saw limited use during the conflict due the North Vietnamese use of guerilla tactics, heavy jungle growth, and ready availability of napalm aerial bombs.

== Variants of the M2 ==
The M2, which was the WWII model, had hexagonal gas caps and hourglass frames. It was also called the M2-2, M2 for the tank groups and -2 for the wand type.

The M2A1-2 is the variation of the M2 devised during the Korean War. These had straight sided backpack frames, vented gas caps, a cylinder sized regulator and a safety valve. These are much more common today than WWII models.

M2A1-7 was a flamethrower used by the American troops during the Vietnam War. It is the updated version of the M2A1-2 unit used during The Korean War.

It has four controls:

- Back of the rear grip: firing safety catch.
- Front of the rear grip: firing trigger.
- On top of the front part: igniter safety catch
- Under the front part: igniter trigger.

The M9A1-7 was the most common model used in Vietnam and is much lighter and easier to use. Tanks for this weapon are commonly found, but most wands were destroyed after the Vietnam war.

Some U.S. Army flamethrowers have a front handgrip with the same shape as the rear handgrip. In these models the igniter controls are on the front handgrip, arranged in the same way as the rear handgrip controls. The M2 was replaced by the M9A1-7 flamethrower which was used in Vietnam. The M9A1-7 was replaced by the M202A1 FLASH.

== Operators ==
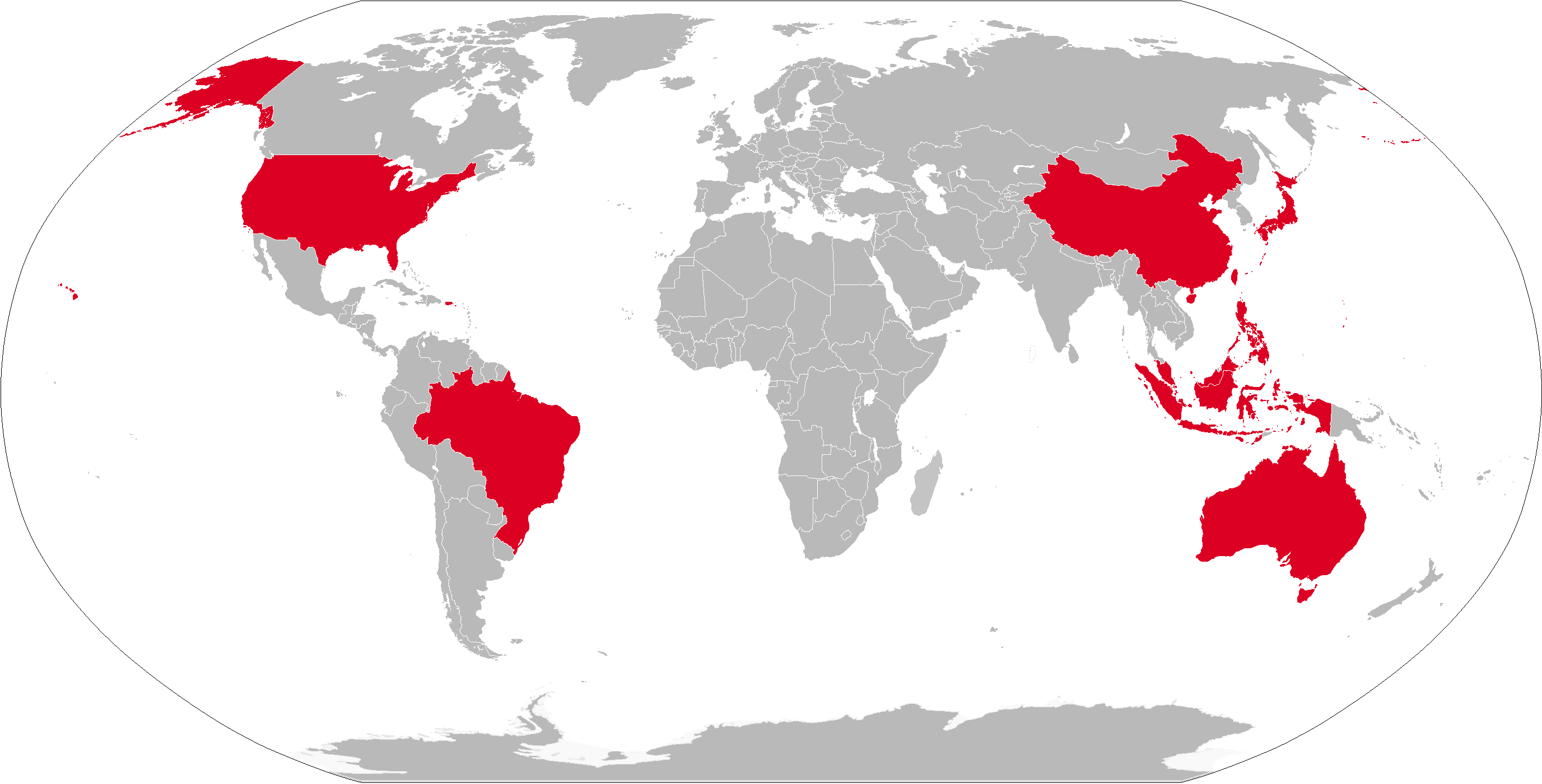
Map with former M2 flamethrower operators

=== Former operators ===
- Australia
- Brazil
- China
- Republic of China (World War II)
- Japan (after World War II for the JSDF; later replaced by a Japanese made flamethrower called Type 1-1 based on the M2)
- Philippines
- United States
- Indonesia
- Malaysia
- Portugal
- Thailand

== Gallery ==
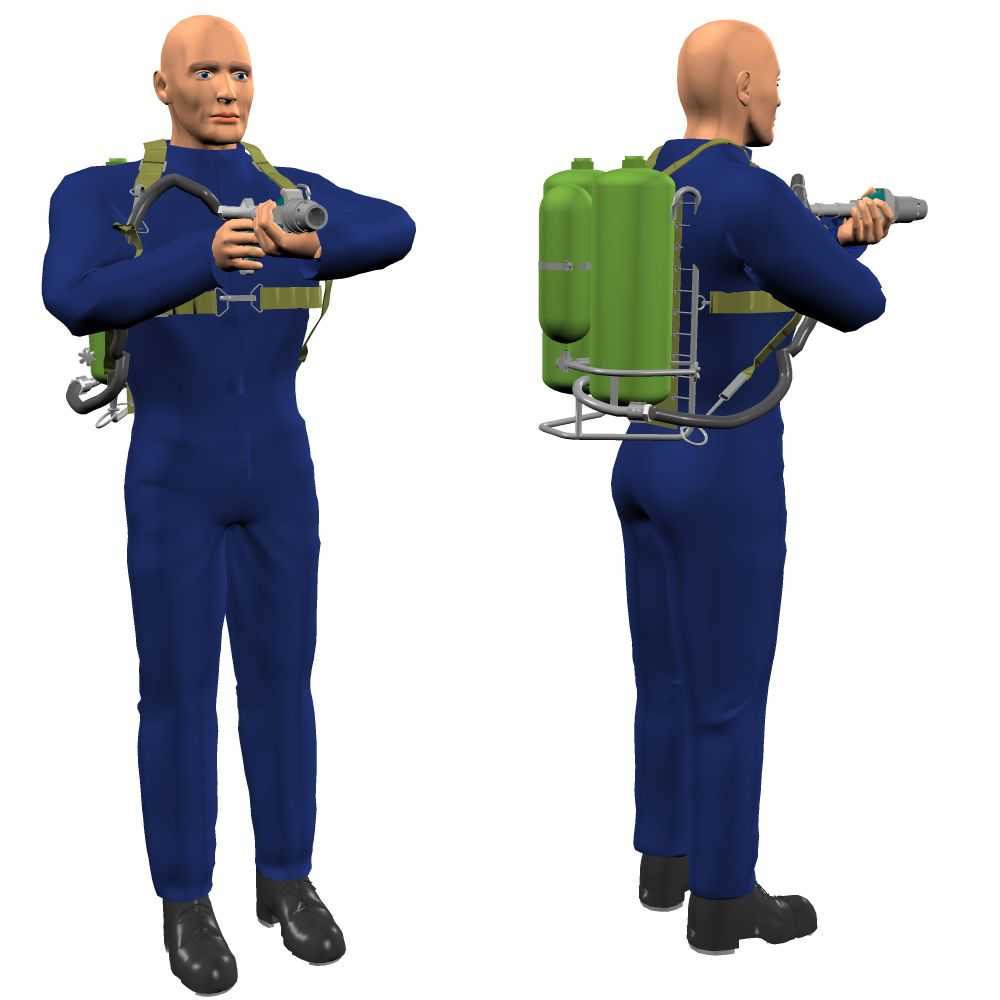
Two CGI views of a man with an M2A1-7 U.S. Army flamethrower. The two big tanks contain the fuel. The small tank contains the pressurizing gas (nitrogen).

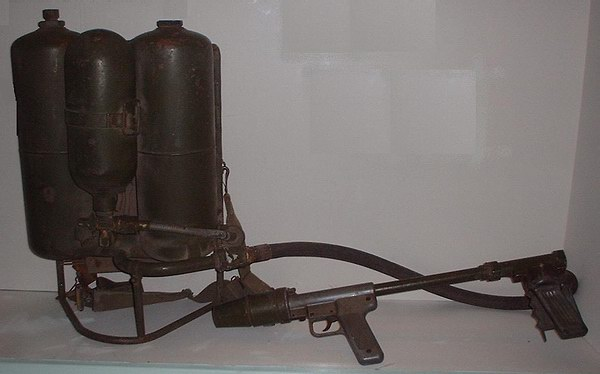
M2A1 flamethrower.

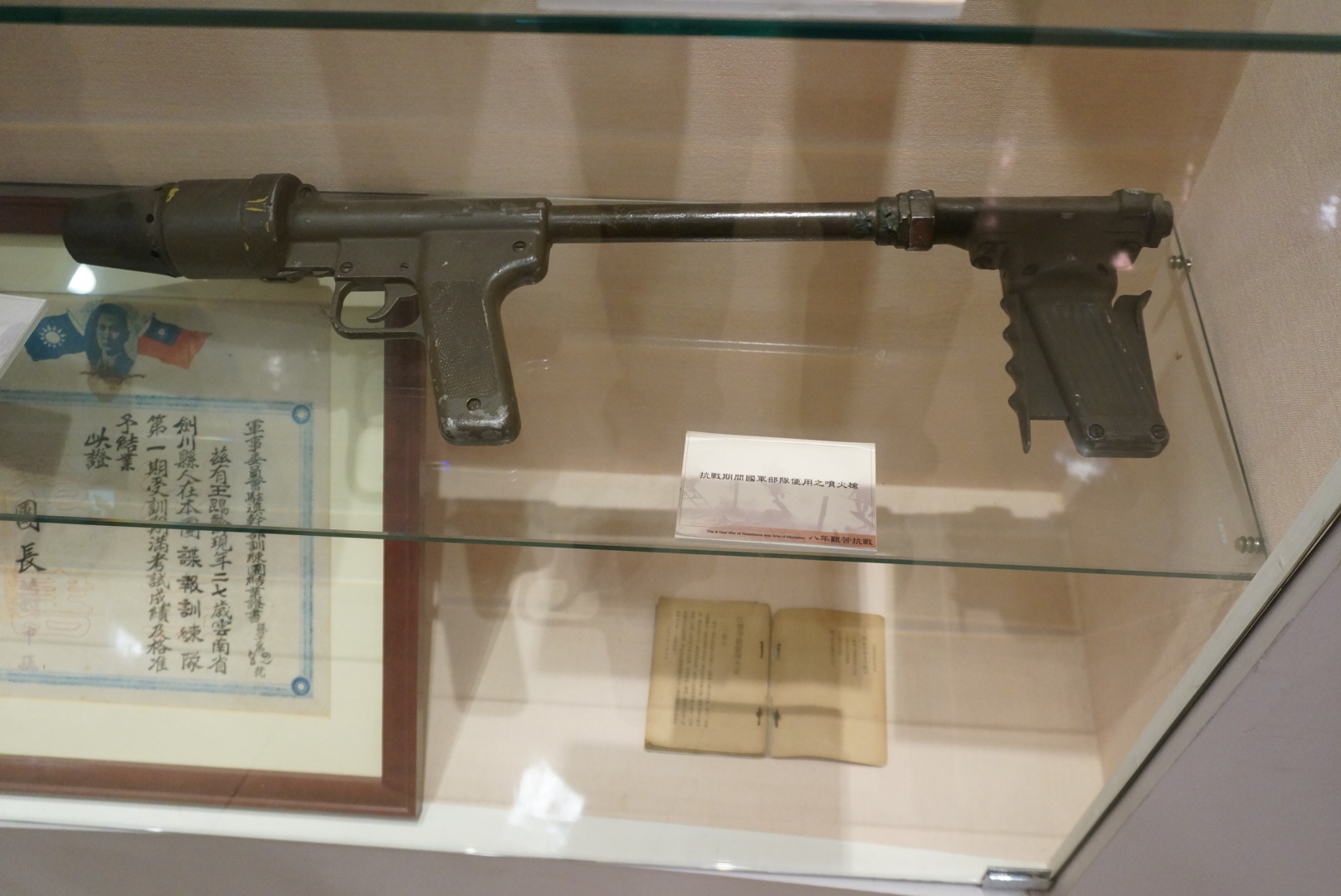
M2A1 flamethrower used by the Republic of China during the China-Burma-India Theater.

M2A1-7 flamethrower being tested at Lai Khe base, Vietnam.

== See also ==
- List of flamethrowers
