= M1 flamethrower =

American flamethrower

M1A1 Flamethrower
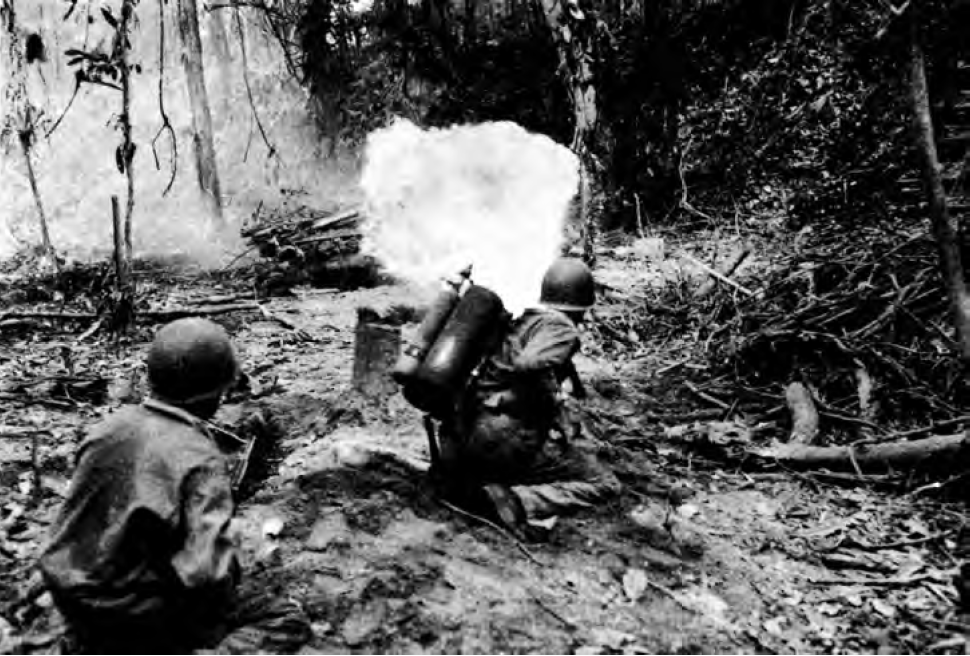
- M1A1 flamethrower being used against a Japanese bunker, March 1944
- Type: Flamethrower
- Place of origin: United States

Service history
- In service: 1941–1945
- Used by: United States; Republic of China; Philippine Commonwealth; Philippines; Vietcong
- Wars: World War II

Production history
- Designer: US Army Chemical Warfare Service
- Designed: 1940–41
- Manufacturer: State Factories
- No. built: 13,886 (1,000 M1 & 12,886 M1A1)
- Variants: E1, E1R1, M1, M1A1

Specifications
- Mass: 70 lb (31.8 kg)
- Crew: 2
- Rate of fire: ~half a gallon a second
- Effective firing range: 65.5 ft (20 m)
- Maximum firing range: 141 feet (43 m)
- Feed system: 5 shots 1 (4.7 gal) Napalm infused gasoline tank (fuel); 1 Nitrogen tank (propellant)
- Sights: None

The M1 and M1A1 were portable flamethrowers developed by the United States during World War II. The M1 weighed 72 lb (33kg), had a range of 15 meters, and had a fuel tank capacity of five gallons. The improved M1A1 weighed less, at 65 lb (29kg), had a much longer range of 45 meters, had the same fuel tank capacity, and fired thickened fuel (napalm).

Development of the weapon began in July 1940. The first prototype had the designation of E1. The prototype was further refined into the E1R1 model, which resulted in the adopted M1 model in August 1941. These man-portable weapons saw little use in Europe. They were more common in the Pacific, where they were used extensively when attacking pillboxes and fortifications. The M1's unreliability and lack of developed tactics resulted in the failure of the first flamethrower attack on a Japanese fortification in December 1942. The M1 was gradually replaced by the M1A1 in 1943. The M1A1 was replaced by the M2 flamethrower later during the war.

== Configuration ==
The M1A1 had a backpack configuration with a fuel tank that consisted of two upright bottles. A third, smaller upright bottle, the propellant tank, was located between the fuel tanks. The backpack had a high-pressure valve. The nozzle of the weapon was located at the end of a long, thin pipe, which was connected to the backpack via a hose. The pipe was slightly bent at the nozzle end. The nozzle had a hydrogen-powered ignitor. The long and thin cylindrical hydrogen tank was attached parallel to the pipe. A battery provided the spark needed to ignite the hydrogen. The hydrogen flame then ignited the fuel, which was forced out of the fuel tank through the hose and out of the nozzle by the propellant pressure when a valve was opened. The valve lever was located at the other end of the pipe, at the junction of the hose and the pipe.

== Development process ==
World War I saw the initial deployment of flamethrower systems. The Germans fielded the Kleinflammenwerfer and Wex flamethrower unit to complement its specialist battalion stormtrooper units and tactics. Used first in a battle on July 30, 1915 at Hooge in Flanders, the Germans surprised the British and French forces in an assault that inflicted almost 800 casualties. The British and French responded in kind with the fielding of flamethrower systems copied from the Germans. Initial uses of the weapon startled opposing forces, but tactics were developed to counter flamethrower elements including concentrated fire on known flamethrower positions and keeping safe distances.

The arrival of the American troops in December 1917 provided the United States with first hand experience in the fielding of flamethrower systems. The Americans experimented with and developed flamethrower systems during the war, but were curtailed by the signing of the armistice in November 1918. The previously aforementioned tactics against their deployment and the extreme danger of the flamethrower system contributed to the American forces regarding it as a total failure. General Amos A. Fries, chief of the Chemical Warfare Service department from 1920 to 1929, of the American Expeditionary Forces commented that flamethrowers were "one of the greatest failures among the many promising devices tried out on a large scale in the war." The American perception of the system as a failure in the interwar years saw no research or development of flamethrowers. The assessment ran counter to other nations and reappeared in the Abyssinian war of 1935-1936 and the Spanish Civil War.

In the blitzkrieg efforts of the Germans in the years of 1939 and 1940 during World War II, intelligence reports of German troops utilizing flamethrower equipment circulated. The efficacy of the blitzkrieg and deficiency of corresponding flamethrower capability prompted Secretary of War Henry L. Stimson to charge the CWS on August 12, 1940 to develop a flamethrower system.

== Research and development ==
The first experimental model, E1, was manufactured by the Kincaid Company of New York. Initial tests by the engineer board deemed the weapon not ready for military operations. The Chemical Warfare Service worked to redesign flaws in the E1's design, including an ability to fire from a prone position, dropping gas pressure levels, and weight to produce the E1R1, contracted through the Kincaid Company, in March 1941. These experimental versions were issued to soldiers at training camps and witnessed a few of the E1R1 being used in combat.
The M1 was developed from test board suggestions, resulting in a heavier but more rugged American flamethrower system; the weapon system was manufactured in March 1942 and saw deployment by the end of the year to the South Pacific theater. With the invention of Napalm and its significantly improved flamethrowing distance, two to three times as far as the M1's, the flamethrower M1 platform needed to be adjusted to meet the higher operating pressure necessary to maximize the projection of napalm. The resulting M1A1 allowed for fire at pillboxes fifty yards away with 50% of its charge reaching into the structure as compared to the M1's 10% to a pillbox twenty yards away.

== Variants ==
E1
Designated as Experiment 1 in the fall of 1940, the initial model consisting of four main components: fuel storage system, compressed gas storage system, igniter, and flame gun. The E1 had a single fuel tank vertical cylinder with two compartments, an upper and lower compartment. The upper compartment contained pressurized nitrogen that pushed the five gallons of fuel oil in the lower compartment through the barrel and into the flame gun. The fuel system for the E1 consisted of either diesel oil, fuel oil, or blends of gasoline and oil. An igniter, consisting of a compressed hydrogen cylinder and battery, was attached to the flame gun. The flame gun had two triggers, dispense fuel and ignition of fuel as it exited the metal barrel. Weighing in at 70 pounds when filled, the E1 was capable of ranges from fourteen to twenty-one yards.
Issues - engineer board tests identified that the fuel-compressed gas reservoir was impractical, prone position firing was difficult, and as the E1 was firing, gas pressure decreased in the upper compartment tank lowering gas pressure to push the fuel in the lower compartment through the flame gun, thereby reducing weapon range. Additional issues were identified with the dependability, weight, and maneuverability of the E1 flame thrower system.

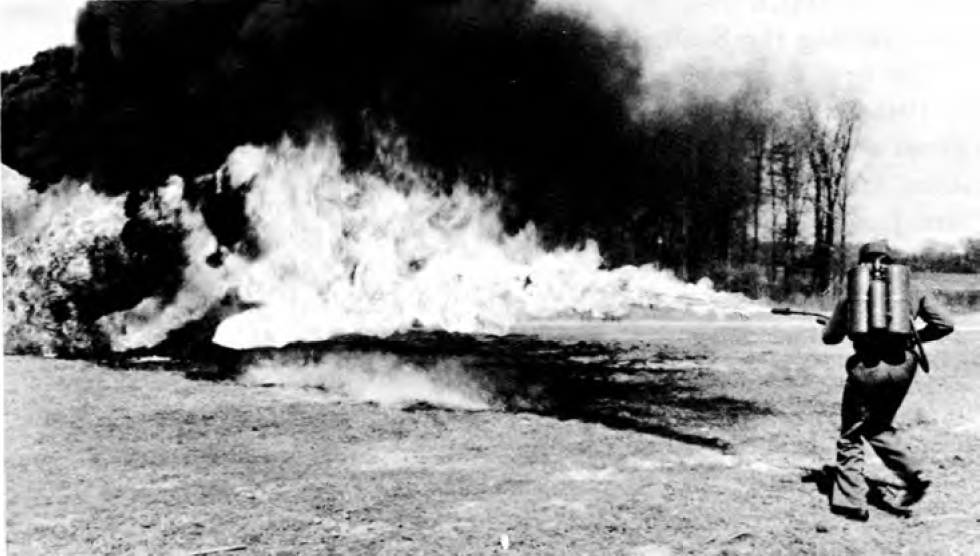
E1R1 Flamethrower fired against a concrete fortification, demonstrating the billowing of smoke

E1R1

The E1 was redesigned by the Chemical Warfare Service and labeled Experiment 1 Revision 1 and was ready for testing in March 1941. The compressed nitrogen was separated away from the fuel reservoir, a feature carried forward in all subsequent models. Additional improvements included the flame gun, valves, and ignition system. The E1R1's filled weight was reduced to 57 pounds and was capable of sustaining 15 to 20 yards for 15 to 20 seconds; the E1R1 weighed 28 pounds when empty.
Issues - Weight, easily damaged parts, and access to the control valves were identified during testing as being problematic.
M1
Test board results led to the development of the M1 production model, consisting of a heavier weight, the M1 was more rugged and had a longer range as standardized for production in March 1942. The M1 system made it to the South Pacific theater by the end of the year.
M1A1
The invention of napalm led to its evaluation as a flamethrowing agent. Gasoline and oil mixtures sprayed as it left the barrel of the flame gun, whereas napalm thickened fuel left the barrel in a compact stream capable of ricocheting off of and into openings and subsequently sticking to flat surfaces. Initial tests showed that the current M1 platform was incapable of providing the ideal range with napalm. The Chemical Warfare Service was asked to adapt the napalm fuel system to the M1 platform to avoid procurement issues, thus facilitating the development of the M1A1 platform. Modifications included the fuel system, pressure regulator, valves, and the flame gun to facilitate the higher pressures required to achieve ideal ranges with the napalm. The M1A1 was capable of reliably firing to distances fifty yards away versus the M1's ideal firing range of twenty yards.

== Deployment history ==
D-Day saw the fielding of 150 flamethrowers, of which 100 flamethrowers were recovered on the shore as they were abandoned when their users slogged through the waters to reach the German ramparts.
