= M2 mortar =

US infantry mortar

US M2 60 mm mortar
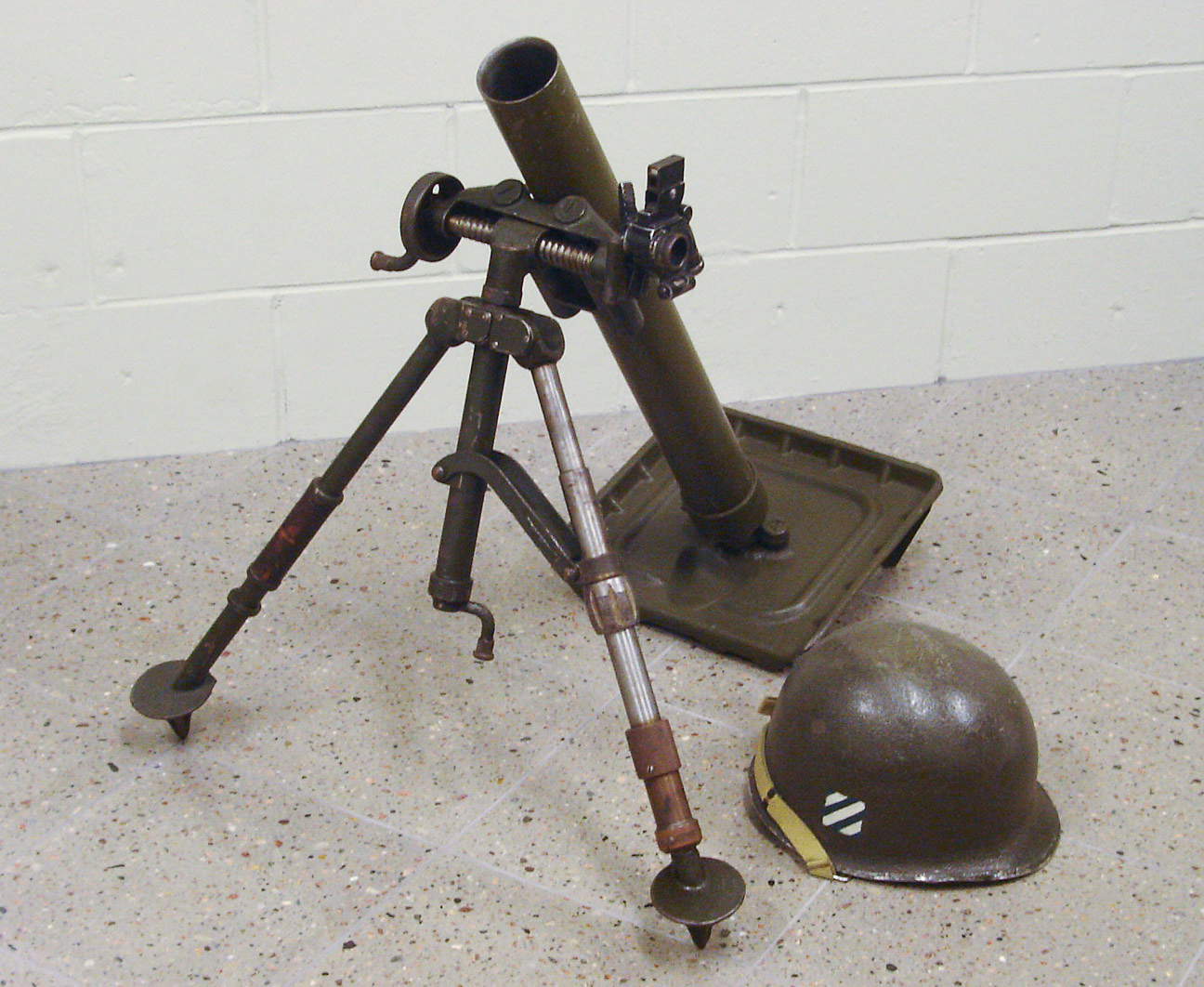
- World War II era 60 mm U.S. M2 mortar, G.I. helmet shown for scale
- Type: Infantry mortar
- Place of origin: United States

Service history
- Used by: United States; France; Israel; South Korea; Republic of China; China; Turkey; North Vietnam; South Vietnam; Vietnam
- Wars: World War II; Chinese Civil War; First Indochina War; Korean War; Algerian War; Portuguese Colonial War; Rhodesian Bush War; Vietnam War; Soviet–Afghan War; Iran–Iraq War; Lebanese Civil War; Nicaraguan Revolution; Guatemalan Civil War

Production history
- Designer: Edgar Brandt
- Variants: Type 31

Specifications
- Mass: 42 lb (19 kg)
- Barrel length: 2 ft 5 in (726 mm)
- Crew: 5 (squad leader, gunner, assistant gunner, two ammunition carriers)
- Shell: 3 lb (1.4 kg)
- Caliber: 60 mm (2.36 in)
- Elevation: +40° to +85°
- Traverse: 7°
- Rate of fire: 18 rounds per minute
- Muzzle velocity: 520 ft/s (158 m/s)
- Maximum firing range: 1.1 mi (1.8 km)

The M2 mortar is a 60 millimeter smoothbore, muzzle-loading, high-angle-of-fire weapon used by U.S. forces in World War II, the Korean War, and the Vietnam War for light infantry support.

== History and description ==
During the late 1920s, the US Army began examining mortars to act as light infantry support weapons for company level fire support, bridging the gap between medium mortars and hand grenades. In the late 1930s, the War Department eventually settled on a 60 mm design from Edgar Brandt, a French ordnance engineer. The Ordnance Department purchased eight of the French-built weapons in 1938, standardizing them as the Mortar, 60 mm, M1. When production drawings were revised by Watervliet Arsenal to adopt standard American threads, tubes, and plates, the weapon was redesignated the Mortar, 60 mm, M2. In January 1940, the first production contract for 1,500 mortars was issued to the Read Machinery Company of York, Pennsylvania. As requirements rose in 1940, another contract was placed with the Danville, Pennsylvania-based Kennedy-Van Saun Engineering Company. Requirements declined early in 1944, but by the end of the year, demand increased and exceeded existing supply. The War Department ordered Kennedy-Van Saun to increase production, and also added a contract from the Firestone Tire and Rubber Company; production of the M2 during the first eight months of 1945 totaled 30,152, nearly equaling that of the previous three years.

Although classed as a light mortar, the M2 had considerable range compared to similar 50 mm and 60 mm-caliber weapons like the British Ordnance SBML two-inch mortar, Soviet RM-38 and related models, and German 5 cm Granatwerfer 36, with its fixed-firing pin design allowing for a high rate of fire by trained crews. Normally employed by weapons platoons of U.S. infantry companies, the M2 is of the usual mortar pattern of the day. It consists of a smoothbore metal tube on a rectangular baseplate, supported by the simple M5 bipod to which are attached elevation and traverse mechanisms. The firing pin was fixed in the base cap of the tube, firing the bomb automatically when it was dropped down the barrel. The weapon was used throughout World War II by the U.S. Army and U.S. Marine Corps. It saw service again in the Korean War, and by French forces in their counterinsurgency campaigns in Indochina and Algeria.

The VPA used many M2 mortars captured from France (equipped by the US) and self-produced, equipped to companies and battalions.

It was used under designation m/952 by Portugal during the Portuguese Colonial War. During the Vietnam War, the M2 was again used by the U.S. Army and marines, as well as by South Vietnamese forces. Ultimately, the M2 was replaced by the M224 in 1978.

== Chinese variants ==
China (the Republic of China prior to 1949) also locally produced the M2 mortar, which was designated as the Type 31. After the People's Republic of China was established in 1949, some Type 31s were supplied to North Korea and North Vietnam. It was later modified as the Type 63 and were supplied to Mujahideen rebels during Soviet–Afghan War. A variant called Type 63-1 has been produced under license by the Pakistan Machine Tool Factory Limited and by the Helwan Machine Tools Company in Egypt.

== Operation ==
Each mortar shell had a screw-on cap in its base. Inside the hollow in the tail, it contained a 20-gauge M5A1 ignition cartridge. This was a paper shotgun shell filled with ballistite powder.

The mortar had a firing pin in the bottom of the tube. When the shell was dropped down the tube, the firing pin struck the ignition cartridge in the shell's tail, detonating it. When the cartridge detonated, the explosive gases exited the base of the shell through two bleed holes. This propelled the shell out of the tube in an arc. Unassisted, the mortar shell had a range of about 200 to 325 yards (183 to 297 m).

To increase the mortar's range, shells were issued with four waterproof cellophane bags of propellant, called increments, fastened to the stabilizing fins with wire clips. The ignition cartridge would ignite the propellant, increasing chamber pressure and the shell's muzzle velocity. All four increments and the ignition cartridge pushed the maximum range to about 2,000 yards (1,800 m) at 45 degrees elevation (depending on the shell's length and weight). To reduce the mortar's muzzle velocity, increment charges were removed as needed before firing. This allowed great flexibility in the angle at which shells impacted the target area, allowing the weapon to drop shells behind hills or buildings.

== Ammunition ==
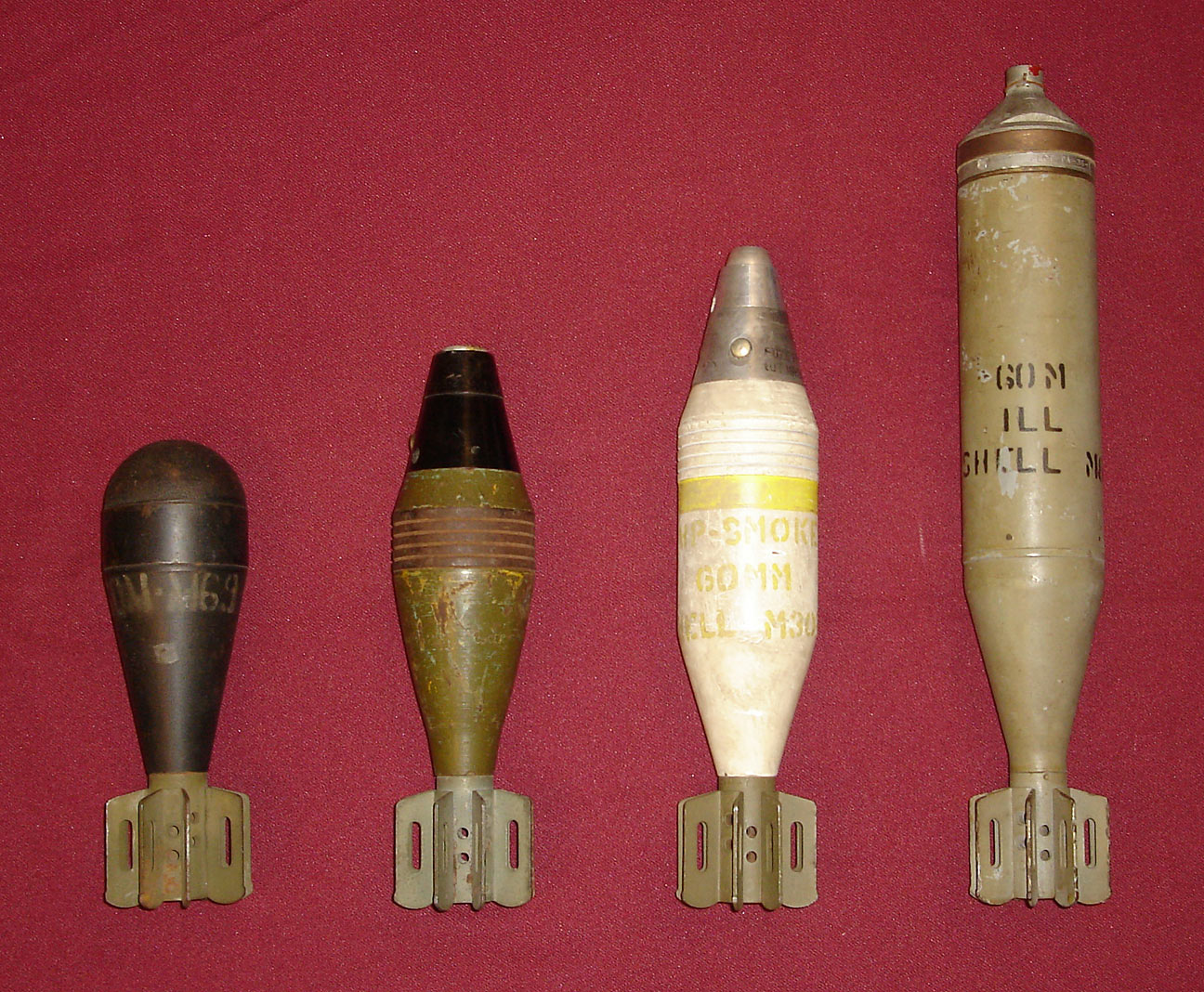
60 mm mortar shells for the U.S. M2 mortar. Left-to-right: M69 training/practice, M49A2 high explosive, M302 white phosphorus/smoke, M83 illuminating (parachute flare)

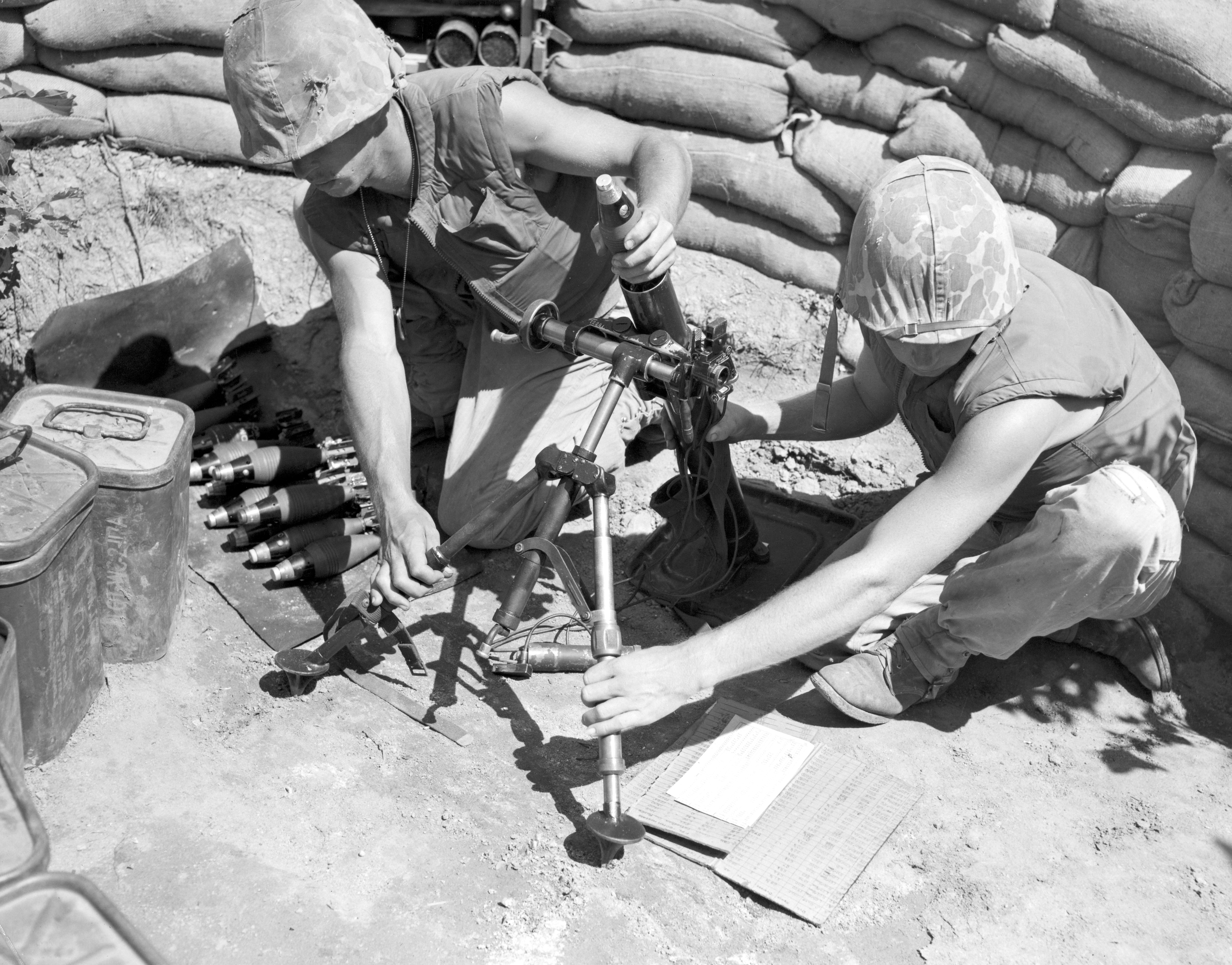
U.S. Marines firing M2 mortar during the Korean War. August, 1952

The M2 Mortar could fire several types of ammunition.

- M49A2 high explosive (HE) with point detonating fuze M52B1 [Total weight: 2.73 lb (1.24 kg), filler weight: 0.34 lb (0.15 kg) of TNT]: An explosive shell used against infantry and other light area targets. It has a minimum range of 200 yards (180 m) when fired without a boosting charge at a 70° angle and a maximum range of 2,017 yards (1,844 m) when fired with four boosting charges at a 45° angle.
- M49A3 high explosive cartridge (HE) with super-quick point detonating fuze M525 [Weight: 3.05 lb (1.38 kg)]: Often referred to in the field as "HE quick".
- M302 white phosphorus cartridge (WP): A "bursting smoke" shell used as a signaling, screening, smoke-producing, and casualty-producing shell.
  Unlike regular smoke shells of the period, which used a "hot" chemical reaction to generate a smoke cloud, the white phosphorus shell detonates to expose its filler to the air, causing it to spontaneously ignite and generate a thick cloud of white or grey smoke. It also sets combustible materials in its radius of effect on fire, causing secondary smoke sources. If personnel are hit by burning white phosphorus, the fragments will continue to burn inside the wound. They need to be evacuated to a hospital to have the fragments removed under special conditions.
- M83 illuminating cartridge (ILL): A pyrotechnic parachute flare shell used in night missions requiring illumination for assistance in observation.
- M69 training/practice cartridge (TP) [Weight: 4.43 lb (2.01 kg)]: A shell with a cast iron body, inert filler, and detachable fin assembly used to train recruits in firing the M2 mortar. The cast iron body is reusable and the fin assembly can be replaced if damaged.
- M50A3 training/practice cartridge (TP) [Weight 3.15 lb (1.43 kg)]: This practice shell is ballistically matched to the M49A4 HE shell, making it easier for training. They are the same size and weight, only differing in that the M50A3 is inert and emits a puff of white smoke on impact.

== Operators ==
- Albania
- Austria
- Australia
- Bangladesh: Type 63
- Republic of China
- China: Type 31, Type 63 and Type 63-1
- Denmark: designated m/51
- Egypt: Type 63-1 produced under license.
- Ethiopian Empire: used by the Kagnew Battalion
- France
- Greece
- Guatemala
- Haiti
- Indonesia
- Iraq: Type 63
- Japan
- North Korea: Type 31
- South Korea: The Armed Forces was equipped with 579 M2/M19s before the Korean War, and 2,263 were in service with the Army by the end of the war. Replaced with KM19 in the 1970s.
- Lebanon
- Mexico
- Morocco
- Pakistan: Type 63-1 produced under license.
- Portugal
- Turkey
- Thailand
- United States
- South Vietnam
- North Vietnam Type 31
- Republic of South Vietnam
- Vietnam: M2, Type 31 and Type 63

== See also ==
- List of U.S. Army weapons by supply catalog designation
- M1 mortar
- M2 4.2-inch mortar – a 107 mm infantry mortar
- M224 mortar – replacement for the M2 in US service
- CM60A1
- List of weapons of the Lebanese Civil War
- List of weapons of the Portuguese Colonial War
- List of weapons of the Rhodesian Bush War
- List of weapons of the Vietnam War
