= Brandt Mle CM60A1 =

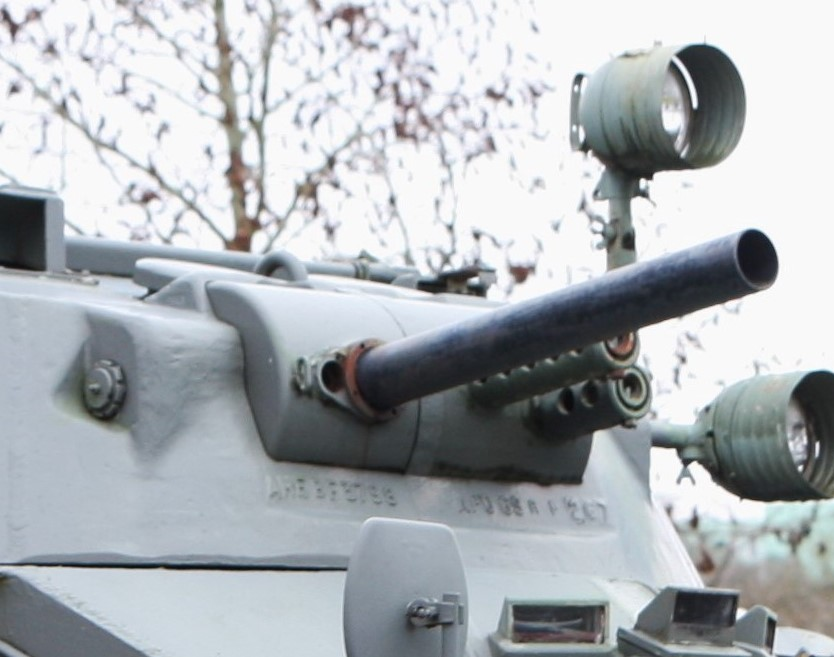
- Muzzle of a Brandt Mle CM60A1 gun-mortar (left) on an HE-60-7 turret
- Type: Mortar
- Place of origin: France

Service history
- In service: 1959–present

Production history
- Designer: Edgar Brandt
- Designed: 1959
- No. built: 1,600+
- Variants: Brandt 60 mm LR Gun-mortar

Specifications
- Length: 1.21 metres (48 in)
- Caliber: 60 millimetres (2.4 in)
- Elevation: -15° to +80°
- Traverse: Depends on mounting; up to 360°
- Effective firing range: 300 metres (330 yd) - direct fire
- Maximum firing range: 2,000 metres (2,200 yd) - indirect fire

The Brandt Mle CM60A1, also known as the Brandt HB 60LP, MCB-60 HB, or simply as the Brandt 60mm LP gun-mortar, is a 60 mm (2.36 in.) gun-mortar. Unlike conventional infantry mortars, it was not designed to be mounted on a bipod and a baseplate, but rather in the turrets of armoured fighting vehicles. The CM60A1 could be fired at a very low angle of elevation, giving it a dual purpose as direct fire artillery. Its hydraulic recoil mechanism reduces peak loads, allowing it to be mounted in very light armoured cars, such as the Panhard AML-60, or wheeled armoured personnel carriers, like the Panhard M3.

== Development history ==
The Brandt Mle CM60A1 was developed as a result of French counter-insurgency experiences during the Algerian War. France had initially favoured the deployment of swift, lightly armoured cars against the Algerian National Liberation Front (FLN), including the M8 Greyhound and Panhard EBR. However, these vehicles had been designed for conventional combat on European battlefields and proved poorly suited to Algerian conditions; their heavy anti-tank armament also risked collateral damage and was of limited usefulness in fighting off guerrilla raids. The French Army wanted a much lighter, more efficient vehicle that was easier to maintain and initially adopted the Daimler Ferret for this purpose. Nevertheless, Ferrets could only be armed with a single general-purpose machine gun, and were regarded as inadequate for offensive purposes. Several French defence contractors took up the challenge of creating yet another new vehicle of similar dimensions to the Ferret but carrying a mortar, which was regarded as more effective than a large gun system at breaking up ambushes and suppressing dispersed FLN positions. The result, the Panhard AML-60, entered service in 1961. AML-60s were fitted with an HE-60-7 turret developed by the Compagnie Normande de Mécanique de Précision (CNMP), which mated the CM60A1 mortar to twin co-axial machine guns or a single co-axial 20 mm autocannon. This turret could store about 43 mortar projectiles. The CM60A1 was unique in that it was the first turret-mounted, breech-loading, dual-purpose mortar to be mass-produced. Its turret mount gave it continuous traverse and, unlike muzzle-loading infantry mortars, it could engage targets of opportunity at close range that could not otherwise be suppressed with indirect fire.

The CM60A1 had a hydraulic recoil system and could be loaded with standard mortar ammunition for indirect fire support, as well as specialised direct fire ammunition. It could still be muzzle loaded from outside the vehicle, but was unique in its opening breech locked by a falling block, much like direct fire artillery. The firing pin was automatically withdrawn when the breech was unlocked, reducing the likelihood of misfires. Different variants of the CM60A1 were produced with electrical or mechanical firing mechanisms. A hydraulic buffer provided a recoil of 135 mm.

Ranging was visual and conducted through the turret sights. Due to the lack of a modern fire control system in the HE-60-7 turrets, range to target had to be estimated by the vehicle crew. This required a series of precise but time-consuming calculations to be made by the crew commander for ascertaining firing angles.

Brandt's Mle CM60A1 design proved to be an immediate export success, as South Africa placed an order for 350 AML-60s in 1961, over half of which were to be assembled locally with French technical assistance. A South African military delegation visited France between November 22 and 28 that year to discuss the manufacture of the HE-60-7 turrets and armament under licence. By 1965, South Africa had purchased 450 CM60A1s for the future production of its modified Eland-60 armoured cars, along with a licence for both the mortar and its associated ammunition, which was granted by the French government's Direction technique des armements terrestres (DTAT). CM60A1s manufactured in South Africa under licence were designated K1. The South African Army also referred to this weapon as the M2 (not to be confused with the US M2 mortar).

Throughout the 1960s, CM60A1s were exported with the AML-60 to Algeria, Burundi, Cambodia, Côte d'Ivoire, Iraq, Ireland, Morocco, Nigeria, Portugal, Rwanda, Saudi Arabia, Senegal, and Spain. Some governments favoured the purchase of the lightly armed AML-60 model as opposed to the heavier AML-90 due to its comparatively attractive cost.

By the mid to late 1970s, the CM60A1 had been largely superseded by the similar Cloche Spéciale (CS) 60, which was distinguished by its ribbed barrel. The CS 60 utilised more ergonomic ammunition, which allowed for up to 56 mortar projectiles to be stored in the HE-60-7 turret, as opposed to the CM60A1's 43. Nevertheless, both mortar types continued to be marketed in a wide range of commercial turrets for the export market. In the late 1970s, the CM60A1 was successfully mounted on a variant of the Panhard M3 designated M3 VTT 60B. It was also offered for export with the Berliet VXB-170. South Africa later mounted K1 mortars on its fleet of Ratel infantry fighting vehicles, which were designated Ratel-60. A gun-mortar almost identical to the CM60A1 was produced by FN Herstal for the FN 4RM/62F AB armoured cars of the Belgian Gendarmerie.

The CM60A1 was the topic of some controversy in the Irish Army following a series of accidents and misfires. At some point prior to 1980, incidents involving the mortar type had become so common that its use was prohibited. The mortars were removed from Irish AML-60s shortly afterwards and replaced with a single heavy machine gun.

As of 1980, over 1,600 CM60A1 mortars had been produced. A much larger, long-ranged variant of the CM60A1 and CS 60, with a barrel extension incorporated onto the existing armament, was known as the Brandt LR Gun-mortar.

== Combat history ==
CM60A1s have seen extensive combat, primarily with the AML-60 and Eland-60 light armoured cars. French forces deployed AML-60s armed with CM60A1 mortars during Operation Tacaud in Chad. South African Eland-60s were used for counter-insurgency and frequently engaged militants of the People's Liberation Army of Namibia (PLAN) during the South African Border War. Throughout the Portuguese Colonial Wars, the AML-60 equipped Portuguese reconnaissance platoons, mainly deployed for convoy escort. In 1975 Zaire donated some of its AML-60s to the National Union for the Total Independence of Angola (UNITA), where they saw action as part of the Angolan Civil War, often manned by French or Portuguese mercenaries. Nigerian AML-60s were exposed to considerable combat during the Nigerian Civil War between 1967 and 1970, with one being captured by Biafran forces. AML-60s also saw service with the Royal Cambodian Army and the Khmer National Army during the Cambodian Civil War between 1967 and 1975.

AML-60s have been deployed as part of three United Nations peacekeeping missions since 1964: UNOSOM, UNIFIL, and UNFICYP.

== Ammunition ==
Two different models of high explosive ammunition were typically fired from the CM60A1: the M35/47 shell, which was developed for the Brandt Mle 1935 and had a range of 1,600 metres, and the M61 shell, which has a range of 2,000 metres. Specialized smoke, coloured marker, and practice variants of the M61 projectiles were also used. Other projectiles included canister and M63 illumination rounds.

The CM60A1 could fire any type of ammunition used by the Brandt Mle 1935 and the US M2 mortar.

South Africa manufactured its own range of high explosive, canister, and illumination rounds for the K1, as well as a unique smoke projectile.

At some point, France developed an armour-piercing shell for the CM60A1, but it is unclear whether this entered production.

== Operators ==
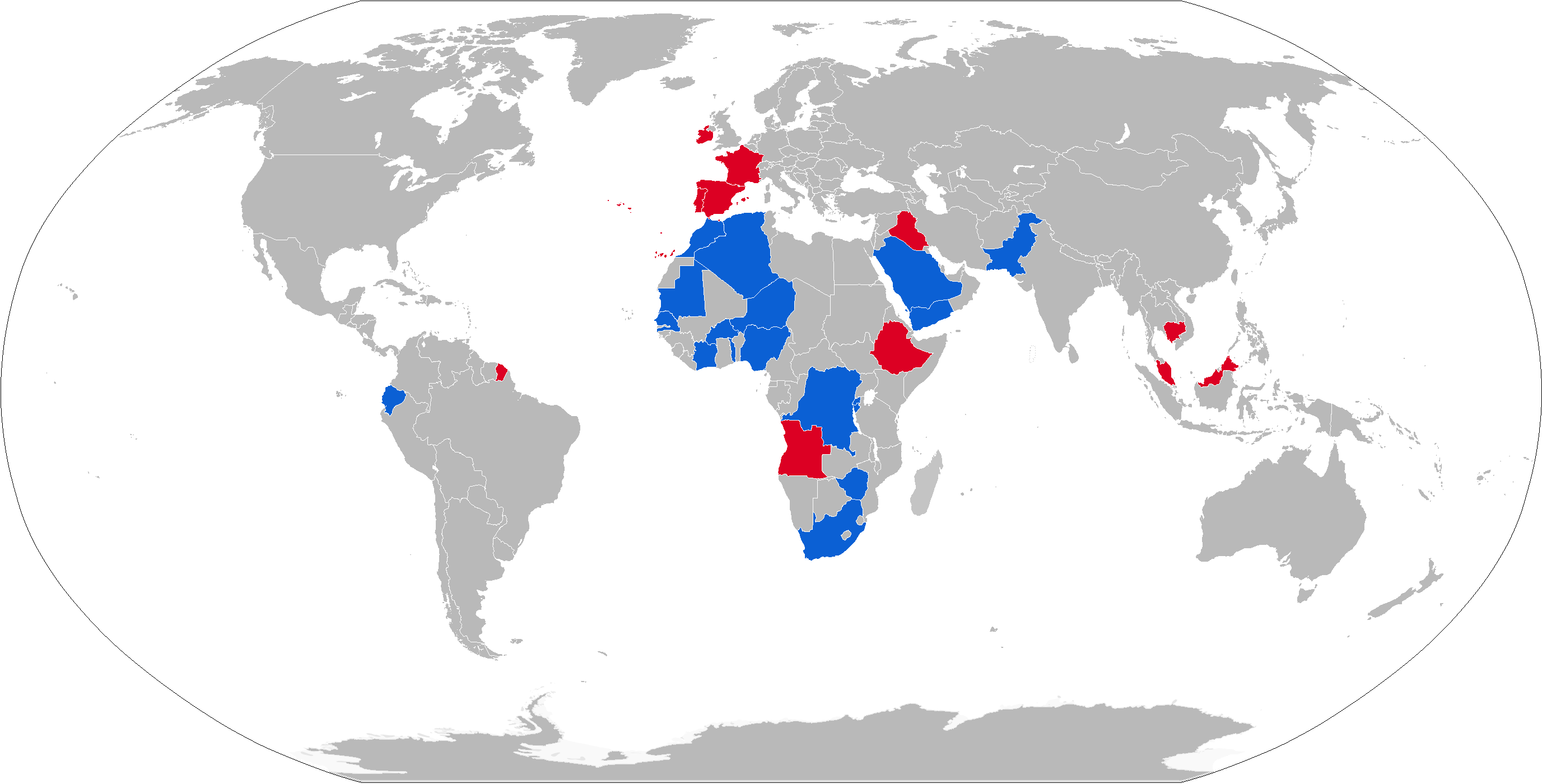
Map with Brandt CM60A1 operators in blue with former operators in red

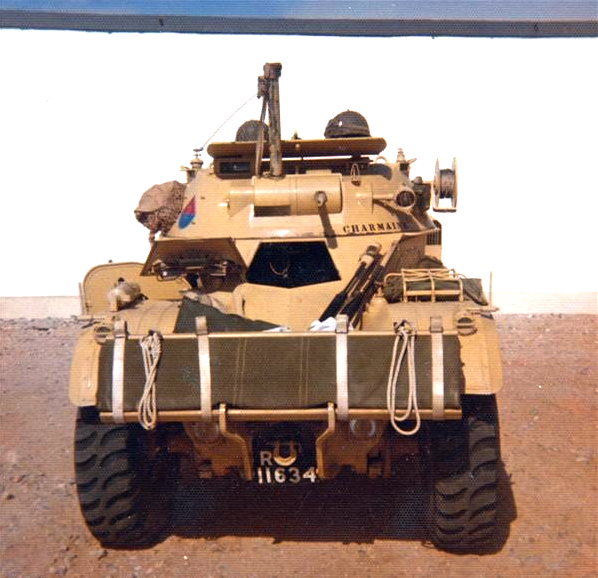
Eland-60 armoured car with its K1/M2 mortar at full elevation.

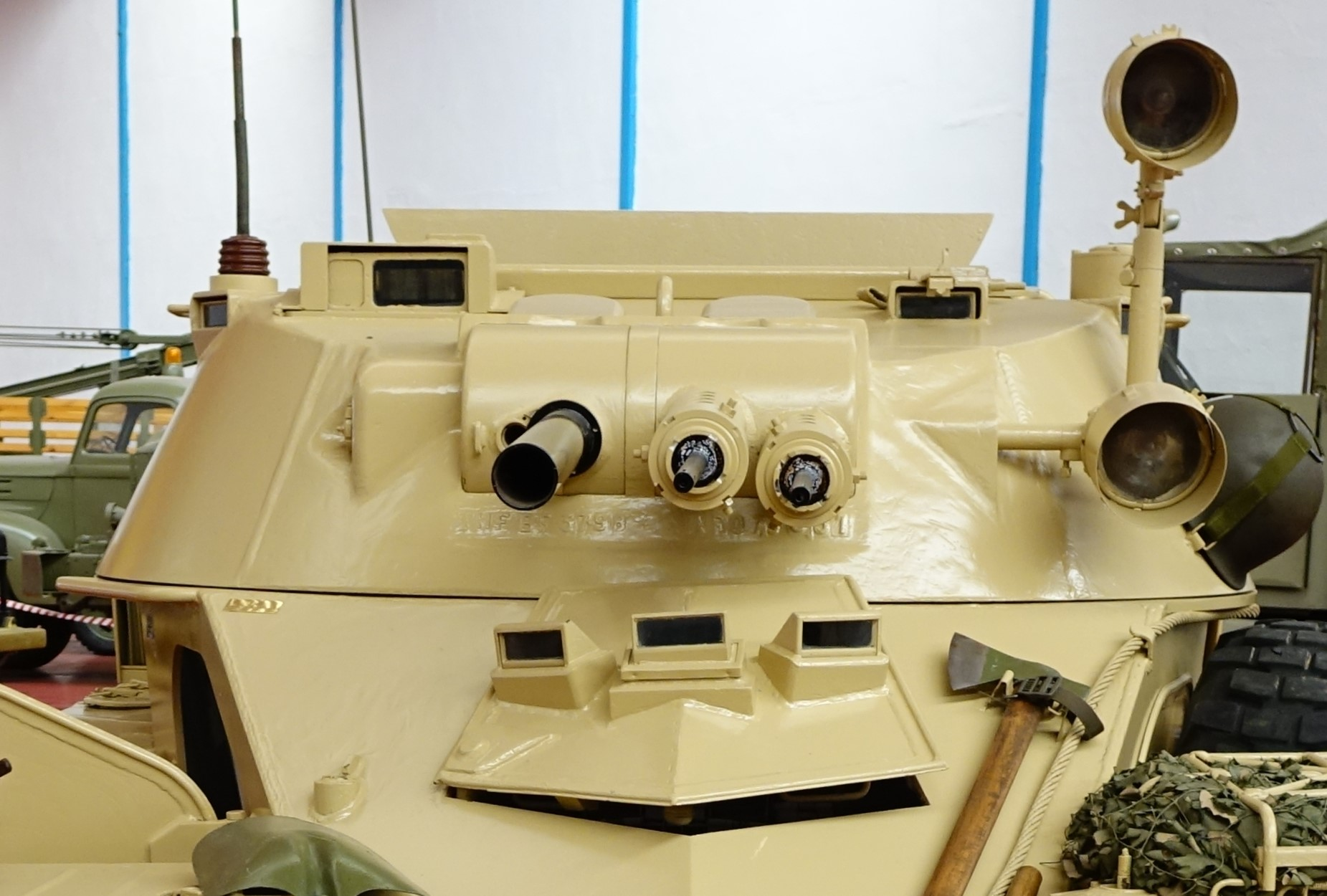
Closeup of an AML-60 turret, showing the CM60A1 on the left and two co-axial machine guns on the right.

CM60A1 mortars have been exported widely with AML-60, Eland-60, and Ratel-60 armoured fighting vehicles.

- Algeria
- Burkina Faso
- Burundi
- Côte d'Ivoire
- Democratic Republic of the Congo
- Ecuador
- Gabon
- Mauritania
- Morocco
- Niger
- Nigeria
- Pakistan
- Rwanda
- Saudi Arabia
- Senegal
- South Africa: Eland-60 retired, Ratel-60 still in service
- Togo
- Yemen
- Zimbabwe

=== Former operators ===
- Angola: Some retained from Portugal; all retired.
- Cambodia: Retired prior to 2002.
- Ethiopia: Retired prior to 2002.
- Iraq
- Ireland: Retired in the 1980s.
- France: Retired prior to 2002.
- Malaysia
- Rhodesia
- Spain: Retired prior to 2002.
- Zaire

Use of Brandt's Mle CM60A1 Gun-Mortar
| Vehicle | Designer | Country | Gun | Users |
|---|---|---|---|---|
| Berliet VXB | Berliet | France | Mle CM60A1 | None (prototype) |
| EE-11 Urutu | Engesa | Brazil | Mle CM60A1 | None (prototype) |
| Eland-60 | Sandock-Austral | South Africa | Denel K1 | South Africa, Côte d'Ivoire, Gabon, Zimbabwe |
| Panhard AML-60 | Panhard | France | Mle CM60A1 | Algeria, Burundi, Cambodia, Côte d'Ivoire, Ethiopia, Iraq, Ireland, Mauritania, Niger, Nigeria, Portugal, Saudi Arabia, Senegal, Spain, Zaire, others |
| Panhard M3 VTT 60B | Panhard | France | Mle CM60A1 | None (prototype) |
| Ratel-60 | Sandock-Austral | South Africa | Denel K1 | South Africa, Rwanda |
| Rooikat | Sandock-Austral | South Africa | Denel K1 | None (prototype) |
