= Brandt 60 mm LR gun-mortar =

Brandt long-range gun-mortar
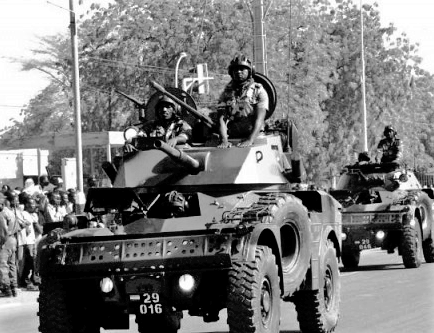
- Panhard AML 60-20 Serval on parade, with the Brandt 60mm LR gun-mortar.
- Type: Mortar
- Place of origin: France

Production history
- Designer: Edgar Brandt

Specifications
- Mass: 75 kilograms (165 lb)
- Length: 1.8 metres (5 ft 11 in)
- Barrel length: 1.80m (70in)
- Shell weight: 2.2 kilograms (4.9 lb)
- Caliber: 60 millimetres (2.4 in)
- Elevation: -11° to +75°
- Traverse: Depends on mounting; up to 360°
- Rate of fire: 10 rpm
- Muzzle velocity: 250 metres per second (820 ft/s)
- Effective firing range: 5,000 metres (5,500 yd)

The Brandt 60 mm long-range gun-mortar is a breech loading mortar capable of firing on a flat trajectory. It was developed from the Brandt Mle CM60A1 and resembles a long-barrelled, long-ranged variant of that weapon.

== Description ==
The Brandt 60mm LR gun-mortar was developed directly from the Brandt Mle CM60A1 and retains the same falling block breech mechanism reminiscent of direct fire artillery. The firing pin is automatically withdrawn when the breech is unlocked, reducing the potential for misfire. Like its predecessor, it can be either muzzle-loaded or breech-loaded and was designed to be mounted in the turrets of armored fighting vehicles. The LR gun-mortar was also tested as a deck-mounted support weapon for maritime patrol craft, such as the VCSM. It utilizes a hydraulic recoil system. The recoil length is 170 mm (6.7 in), maximum recoil thrust is 2,800 kg (6,200 lb), and the weight of the recoiling mass is 75 kg (165 lb).

The LR gun-mortar has a total length of 1.8 m (5 ft 11 in). Different variants were produced with electrical or mechanical firing mechanisms.

== Ammunition ==
The LR gun-mortar was designed to fire specialized long range ammunition with an indirect fire range of 5,000 m (16,000 ft) and a direct fire range of 500 m (1,600 ft). The standard LR high-explosive projectile possessed a fuze that detonated at any angle of impact. It was manufactured of perlitic cast iron and had unfolding fins. The projectile weights 2.2 kg (4.9 lb) and is 367 mm (14.4 in) long. Brandt claimed that its explosive charge possessed an efficiency comparable to that of an 81 mm (3.2 in) mortar bomb.

The LR gun-mortar could also fire any of the standard 60 mm (2.4 in) ammunition produced for French infantry mortars, including the Mk 72, Mk 61, and Mk 35/47 high-explosive projectiles, as well as the Mk 63 illumination shell. However, without the specialized ammunition, indirect fire range is reduced to 3,000 m (9,800 ft) and direct fire range to 400 m (1,300 ft).

== See also ==
- Brandt 60 mm HB gun-mortar
- MCB-81 81 mm gun-mortar
- 2B9 Vasilek 82 mm gun-mortar
- List of artillery
- List of infantry mortars
