= Edgar Brandt =

French businessman

Edgar William Brandt (24 December 1880 – 8 May 1960) was a French ironworker and prolific weapons designer. In 1901 he set up a small workshop at 76 rue Michel-Ange in the 16th arrondissement in Paris, where he began designing, silversmithing, and forging small items such as jewelry, crosses, and brooches. His business began to take off with special commissions such as the door of the French Embassy in Brussels, the Escalier Mollien stairs in the Louvre, and the stair and balcony railing for the Grand Theatre Municipal de Nancy.

At the start of World War I in 1914 Brandt was called to serve. Observing a need for mortars in trench warfare, he designed an aerodynamic mortar shell with obturation grooves (see details at Brandt Mle 27/31) which has not substantially changed since, and made a successful armaments business from his invention after the war. His 60 mm, 81 mm and 120 mm mortars were very widely copied (both under and without license) before, throughout and subsequent to World War II. He also invented armour-piercing discarding sabot artillery shells and contributed substantially to the development of effective HEAT-warhead weapons for infantry anti-tank use through his development of HEAT rifle grenades.

Following the WWI Brandt embarked on his most productive years as a designer, starting to show his work in the Salon d’Automne every year. In 1919 he decided to expand his business, engaging architect Favier and constructing a new building on the corner of the Boulevard Murat and the rue Erlanger. In it he maintained a physical catalogue of his ironwork. He also added nearly 150 people employees, each with specialized tasks ranging from concept to production.

Brandt's career began to peak in the 1920s. Stylish entrances for shops in Paris and lighting were an important part of his production. Additionally, with the rise of radiators in homes, rather than concealing them, he drew attention their way with elegantly designed covers. Throughout the rest of his career his work spanned from iron gates and fireplace grills to and console tables.

Brandt's work was acknowledged by the American Association of Architects making him an honorary member in 1929.

As Brandt was now more known internationally, he expanded his business again and opened a state-of-the-art factory in the Paris suburb of Chatillon-sous-Bagneux, where upward of 3,000 workers fabricated both decorative metalwork and armaments under his name. His company was nationalized in 1936. Several years later World War II forced him to flee with his family to Switzerland. At war's end in 1945 Brandt returned to France but chose not to reopen his studio. Instead, he worked on small projects until he died in 1960.

Today, the Brandt company lives on through several mergers as FagorBrandt, a manufacturer of household appliances.

== Early life ==
Edgar Brandt was born on Christmas Eve of 1880 in Paris, France. Brandt is the first of two children by Betsy Emma Bas and Charles Haag Brandt. Both Brandt and his younger brother “grew up in a protected and affection-filled atmosphere, and were strongly influenced by both their mother's work habits and their father's methods of analyzing and facing problems”. At the young age of thirteen, Brandt was accepted into a prestigious boarding school at the Ecole Nationale Professionnelle de Vierzon, a technical school located approximately seventy miles outside of Paris. Given that the instructors were responsible for developing "skilled workers and industrial designers, factory supervisors, and foremen," the curriculum was oriented more towards a trade school than an art school. The school was divided into two workshops, ironwork and woodworking. Brandt was placed into the ironwork atelier where he first learned traditional forging techniques. Brandt excelled in the workshop and “by age fifteen, he was the most accomplished ironsmith in the school”. Edgar graduated from the Ecole Nationale Professionnelle de Vierzon in 1898 and after graduation served two years in the army. Shortly after his army obligation, Brandt opened his own small and modest atelier where he began his career in metalwork by designing small scale items such as rings, crosses, pendants, and brooches. Some scholars have said that “Brandt's small-scale pieces, marked by accuracy and precision, were a starting point for a design-and-process formula that would slowly lead him to large-scale works in iron that were also meticulously crafted”.

== Early career ==
At the start of Brandt's profession, the Art Nouveau movement was at its peak; and after looking at the work of Louis Majorelle, a French furniture designer during the Art Nouveau movement, Brandt began to start his endeavor in the furniture making process. Due to the design movement of the time, Brandt's furniture pieces used a combination of woodwork and ironwork; the whole piece would be constructed of wood with accents of ornament in metal such as iron, steel, or bronze. In 1903, Brandt made his debut in the fine and applied arts society by exhibiting his work in the Salon des Artistes Decorateurs. Over the next couple of years, Brandt's work was being reviewed more seriously by the decorative-arts critics. As a result, Brandt began to get commissions to work on larger scale projects. The start of his career in large-scale works begin with the grand staircase for the Hotel de Ville in Euville. After getting a taste for larger works, “his early success with forged jewelry and small-scale pieces allowed Edgar to expand his workshop capacities, investing in a larger plant that enabled him to take on larger-scale projects and to hire more workmen”. Eventually, architectural commissions started to take precedence over smaller-scale works.

== Art Deco period ==
The Art Deco movement, also called the style moderne in France, began in Europe around 1910 but it wasn't until the 1920s when Art Deco reached its peak. This design movement can be characterized by the rise of modernity and the qualities found within machine-made objects. However, when specifically looking at France, where Edgar Brandt began his career, the Art Deco period can be characterized “by its embrace of its national past as the intellectual point of departure for creating something new. While designers elsewhere often rejected earlier aesthetics, materials, and manufacturing techniques, French designers sought innovation by embracing history”. Art Deco was created as a reaction against the Art Nouveau movement. Designers’ works during the Art Nouveau movement were criticized for creating art-for-arts sake; they were more interested in aesthetics than with function, materials, and techniques. Additionally, the rise of the industrial revolution spurred the Art Deco movement as handcraftsmanship was starting to be replaced by machine production. Therefore, the “poor-quality mass production of Art Nouveau objects hastened the demise of this wonderfully original style after 1900”. As a result, the metal industry was being dominated by cast iron which was mass produced inexpensively and efficiently. Unfortunately, this also meant that it was limited in what it could do both technically and artistically. Due to this reason, a renewed interest in craftsmanship and design began in France. After the war, “designers felt a sense of urgency to reestablish France as the international leader in luxury trades, both as a matter of national pride and for their important contribution to the French economy”.

== Method ==
With the rise of the industrial revolution, machine production was replacing handcraftsmanship. Therefore, the metal industry was dominated by cast iron, which was mass produced inexpensively and efficiently which meant that it was also limited both technically and artistically. With this in mind, Brandt realized early on in his career that artist and manufacturers were operating from two different perspectives. From the eyes of artists, manufacturers were more interested in the number of sales rather than the process or the technique. Therefore, manufacturers would choose the pieces that were the easiest to produce or the ones that had the most commercial potential. On the other hand, from the eyes of manufacturers, artist created pieces that were too complex and difficult to reproduce. Consequently, it was Brandt's task to align art and industry to make well-realized designs but not at the cost of reproduction. Brandt once said, “the artist must utilize the means that science has placed at his disposal; to preserve or hold on to the old methods is an absurdity”. Thus, instead of continuing with mass production that was commonly used at the time, he implemented the idea of serial production in his workshop. Ultimately, this means that Brandt used machines to simplify the preparation and parts and their assembly but would then go in and add his own handwork and hand finishing to the pieces to add his own personal touch to each of the elements.

== Shift in technology ==
Brandt was always familiar with the changing nature of technology and design. Therefore, it comes as no surprise that when the metal industry introduced new methods of welding, Brandt familiarized himself with the technique and implemented it into his work. In 1903 French engineers designed the oxyacetylene welding torch. This torch allowed ironworkers to join two pieces of metal quickly. The torch could heat up small areas of metal which would then allow the metal to become its own joining material that would eliminate traditional joining methods such as collaring or riveting. Shortly after its release, Brandt was able to master this new technique and became one of the earliest champions of the welding gun. As a result of his mastery of the oxyacetylene welding torch and other forging methods, Brandt was able to develop his own personal style.

In 1908, Brandt put this new method of welding to the test when he designed an Art Nouveau wrought-iron stair rail for M. Bardedienne. In the stairway banister, Brandt created individual pieces that were then all welded together to create an overall composition. Many of Brandt's colleagues remained averse to the idea of this new technology; they felt “the only worthwhile ironwork was that done by a single artisan using the ancient methods”. However, this new technique allowed Brandt to have great success due to the fact that many of his designs could not be produced if it were not for this new method of welding.

== Personal style ==
During the early twentieth century, the design style started to transition from Art Nouveau to Art Deco. The Art Nouveau movement was heavily influenced by flowers and plants. From an early age, Brandt had been interested in nature which he learned to love and respect (probably a result of Brandt's father who was an amateur gardener}}. As abstraction begin to make its way into the world of decorative arts, Brandt was able to retain his love of nature by developing “a repertoire of stylized and conventionalized designs based on nature” .

In 1921, Brandt began developing his own personal style by creating somewhat abstract versions of a cabbage rose. As a result of the limited properties of iron, it could not be treated in the same manner at which painting and drawing gave an artist. Iron could either be shaped into perfect shapes or irregular spirals. As a result, Brandt developed the “potato peel” flower which uses wavy lines in one single spiral motion. In turn, the wavy lines give off the visual tension of a flower. Brandt continued to use the “potato peel” technique throughout the rest of his career; however, in the 1920s, his career began to peak as he developed a distinct and dynamic personal style. Staying true to his love of nature, Brandt's personal style can be “characterized by a rich density of stylized, finely detailed flower and plant motifs, sometimes offset with animal or human figures and areas of gilding”. Examples of Brandt's personal style can be seen in L’Age d’Or, La Perse, Potiche, as well as countless others.

== Daum and Favier collaboration ==
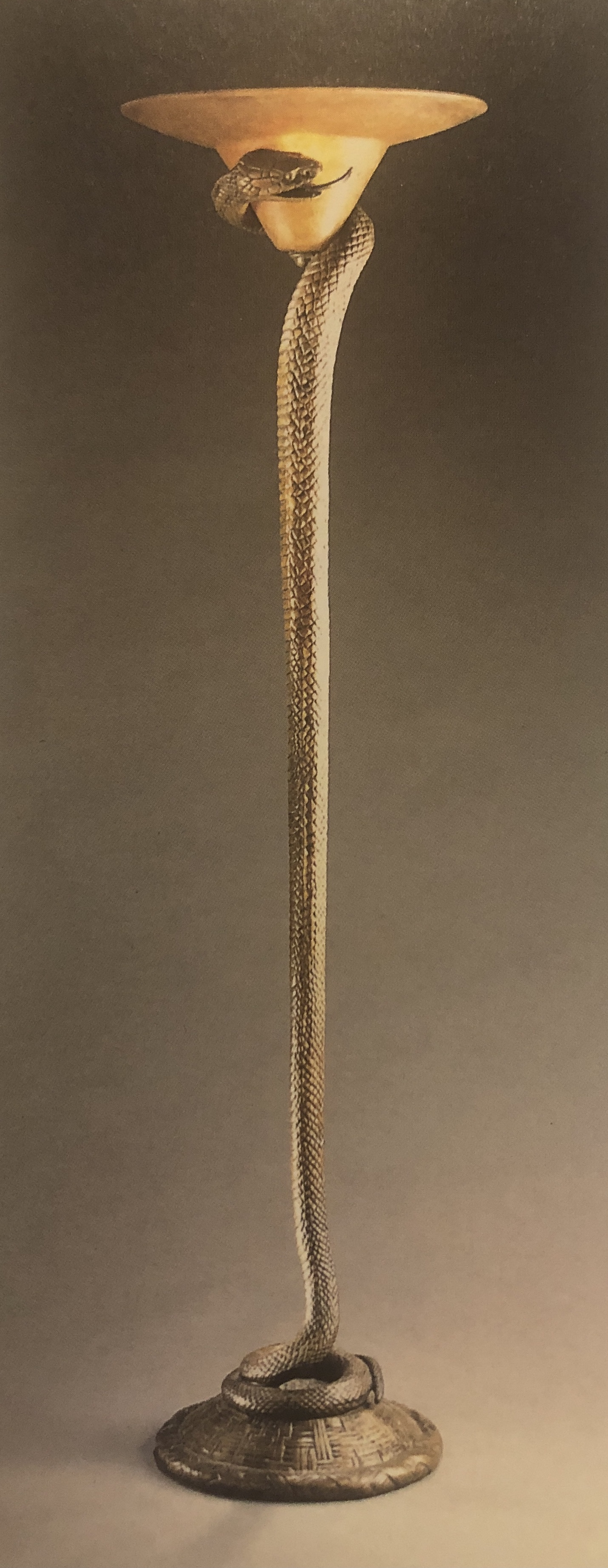
La Tentation, Serpent torchere, 1920–1926

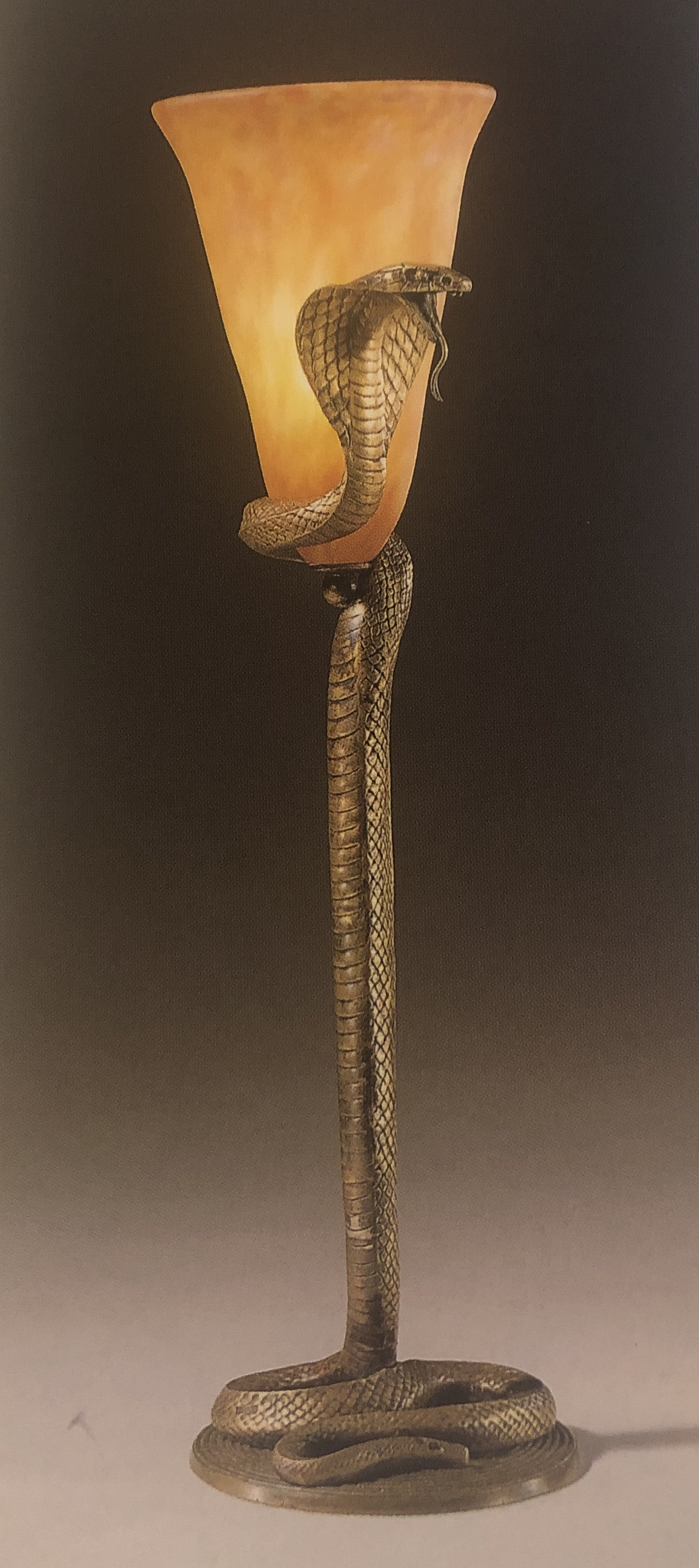
Cobra, Table Lamp, 1925

As a result of Brandt's Escalier Mollien commission, Brandt's influence among the publicity and the decorative-arts community increased. In turn, he began to expand his presence and started to collaborate with architects, the Daum Frères glassworks, and the suppliers of marble and alabaster. Brandt did a number of works with Daum, specifically when designing lamps and chandeliers. Two lamps in particular Brandt designed with Daum are the La Tentation and the Cobra lamps. Both lamps depict snakes rising from their bases and cradling an alabaster Daum glass shade. Favier began working with Brandt in 1919 when Brandt sought him out to create a new set of buildings to house the Brandt company. From that time on, Favier headed Brandt's design staff up until he resigned in 1927. Favier worked on a number of works with Brandt including Brandt's work in the 1925 Exposition.

== Motifs ==
As a result of the dynamic nature of ironwork commissions Brandt received, the subject matter of his designs was very diverse. At times his pieces contained references to other cultures such as Japanese, ancient Greek, Renaissance, Egyptian, African, and modern geometric forms. Brandt's education as well as popular cultural references of the time influenced his work.

During his time at school, Brandt was instructed that “the French excel in art like the ancient Greeks”. Therefore, in many of Brandt's designs, you will see ancient Greek references such as Ionic columns, Greek gods, and Greek principles such as the golden ratio. An example of this can be seen in a 1922 radiator cover called Les Marguerites. Brandt depicts a bowl filled with daisies that sits on top of an Ionic column. Additionally, Brandt would apply the principles of the golden section to his stair railing designs as well as other objects. In Brandt's early career, he believed “that designs geometrically proportioned in this way are infinitely more pleasing to the eye and therefore more satisfying to the soul”.

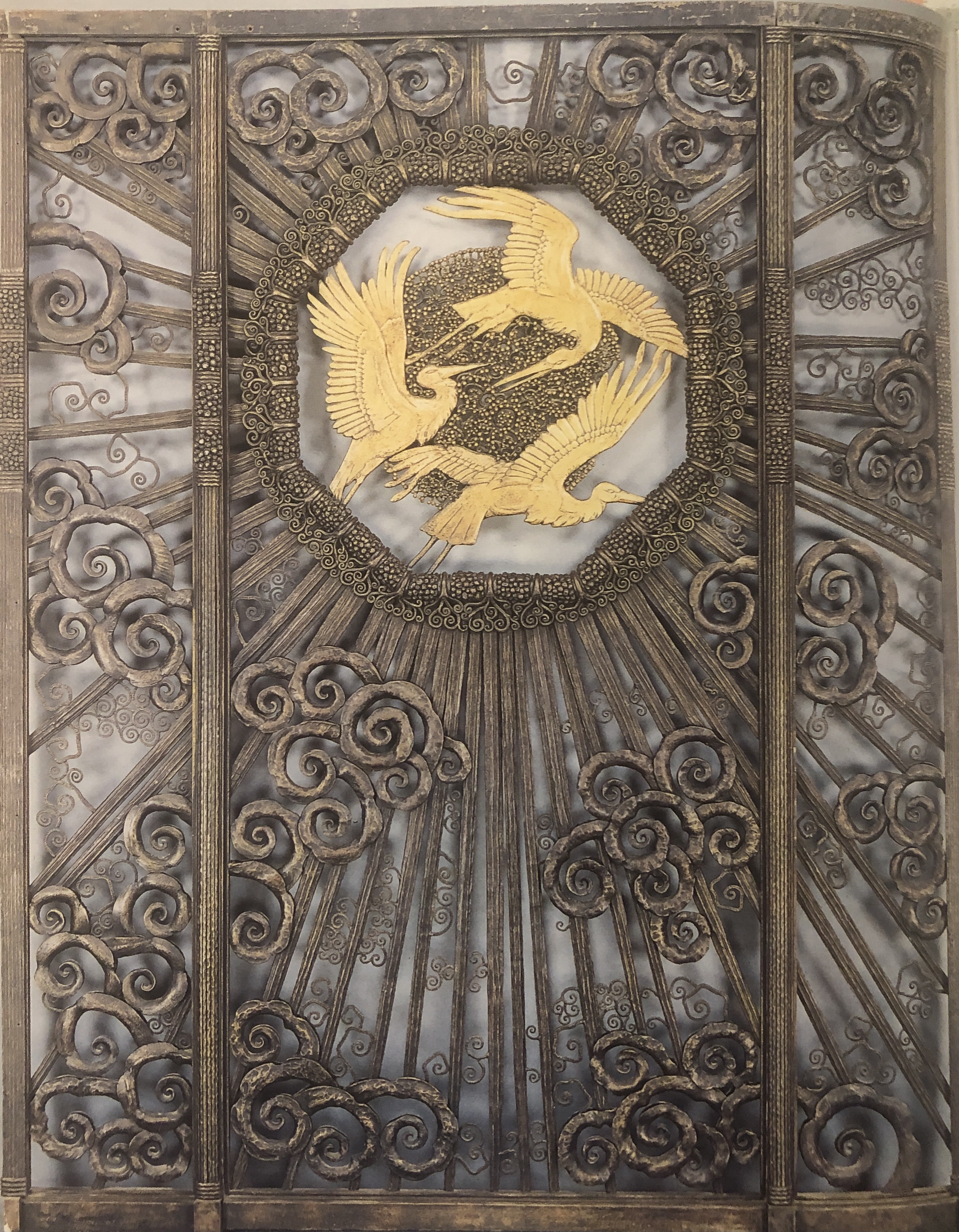
Les Cigognes d'Alsace, Grille, 1922

At the end of the nineteenth century and beginning of the early twentieth century, there was a big influence of Japonisme within the design community. In 1922, Siegfried Bing displayed a massive collection of Japanese prints at the Ecole des Beaux-Arts. As a result, Japanese culture began to circulate throughout French society. In turn, Brandt began to implement Japanese motifs into his work. One motif in particular Brandt referenced was Japanese birds. In the wrought-iron grille, Les Cigognes d’Alsace, Brandt imitated Japanese storks that are represented in Japanese textiles of the eighteenth-century. According to Kahr, in the book Edgar Brandt: Master of Art Deco Ironwork, the panel “contains a central motif of three gilt-bronze storks flying in front of a scroll-filled sun. The shooting rays of the sun intermingle with variation of the “potato peeling” form. The hammering on the clouds and the incised lines chiseled into the rays emphasize the two-dimensional quality of the grille. The octagonal frame of the storks, juxtaposed against the rays and scrolls, offers a richness of contrasting shapes and colors”.

On November 4, 1922, King Tutankhamun's tomb was discovered in the Valley of the Kings, Egypt. With this discovery, photographs were released to the public portraying the treasures found within the tomb. Following this discovery, Brandt began to implement Egyptian motifs in his work, particularly “the lotus, lily, and papyrus forms that decorated Tutankhamun's throne, vases, boxes, and even his shoe buckles”. Although these motifs make an appearance in several of Brandt's works, one instance where this appears is the exit gates for Emile-Jacques Ruhlmann's “Hotel d’un Collectionneur” at the 1925 Exposition. In this panel, Brandt alternates small and large forms of the Egyptian fan that are set into elongated scrolls. A similar version of this panel can be seen on the central gate of the Porte d’Honneur of the 1925 Exposition in Paris.

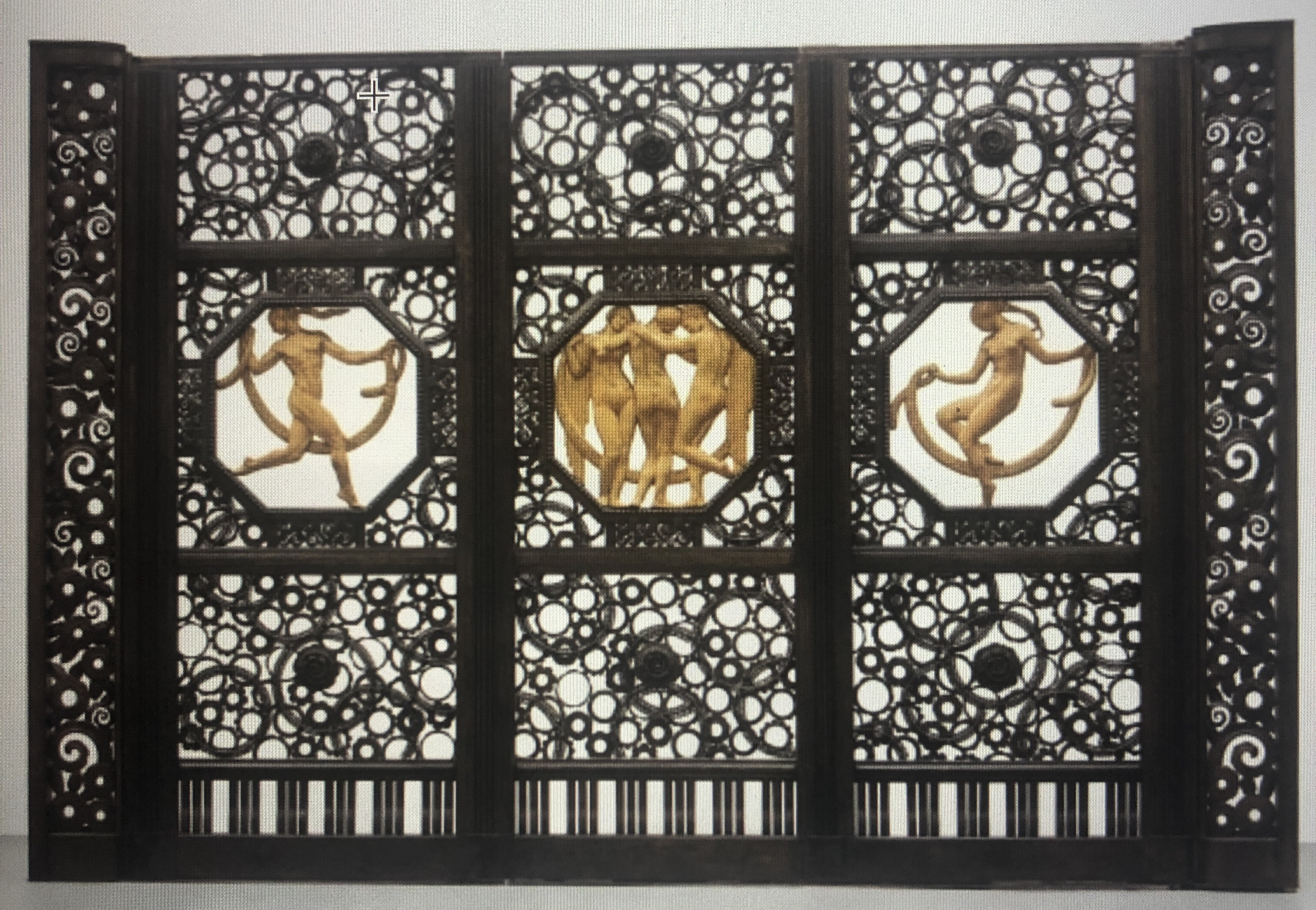
L'Age d'Or, Grille, 1923

In 1923, Brandt, in collaboration with sculptor Max Blondat, were able to complete a five-panel hall gate that was displayed at the entrance of the Salon d’Automnes decorative-arts rooms. At the center of the panels are 5 figures, designed by Blondat. These figures were created using gilt-bronze that reference Greek mythology. The middle panel contains the Three Graces which are flanked by figures of Mercury and Venus on the side panels. From the distinct similarity between the figures in the panels and to Sandro Botticelli's Primavera, it has been concluded that the two designers were referencing “The Golden Age” of the Renaissance. Additionally, the octagonal frame around each of the figures further emphasizes the Renaissance reference. The frames placed around the figures can be paralleled to Renaissance ceiling frescos, such as those by Baldassare Peruzzi in the Sala di Galatea in the Villa Farnesina in Rome. Surrounding the figures are gear-like flowers and scalloped circles designed by Brandt. The combination of the classical figures offset by the abstract expressionistic flowers offers an appealing duality that combines classical iconography with the modernist Art Deco aesthetic. With the use of this design, “Brandt equated the artistic rebirth of his own era with that of the past”.

Prior to Brandt's use of African influences, Africa had been a key fascination among the Parisian artistic community for almost twenty years. Many artists such as Pablo Picasso, Henri Matisse, André Derain, and Maurice de Vlaminck had used indigenous African art as influences in their work. Furthermore, by the early twentieth century, France had established colonies in West Africa which brought African culture to the eyes of Paris's inhabitants. One piece, in particular, that encapsulates the exoticism of Africa is L’Oasis designed by Brandt in 1924. This piece depicts a tropical atmosphere from the use of the large croton leaves.

== 1925 Exposition ==
As the first World War ended, France, being at the center of conflict in the Western Front, suffered in many ways. Therefore, France tries to find a way “to look not to their recent troubled past, but to a brighter and more optimistic future”. Consequently, France decides to host the 1925 Exposition Internationale des Arts Decoratifs et Industriels Modernes. Through the use of the fair, “the French government hoped that the fair would enhance public morale. Paris had previously been the design capital of the world; it was felt that she could prove herself to the world once again”. The fair had strict guidelines that encouraged originality and new ways of thinking; there were to be no reproductions, imitations, or counterfeits of previous design styles. In turn, the exhibition gave way to the new international style, Art Deco. The fair stretched across 57 acres in the middle of Paris with two thirds of the land reserved for French pavilions. Thus, it comes as no surprise that Edgar Brandt not only had his own stand displayed in the exposition but also numerous other works showcased in other spaces.

Immediately as visitors walked up to the gates of the exposition, they were greeted with the design work of Brandt. In partnership with architects Henri Favier and André Ventre, Brandt designed and created the La Porte d’Honneur entrance gates. Sticking to theme by honoring the machine, Brandt portrayed a repeating pattern of fountains of water on the grilles. Additionally, the horizontal roadway gate contained a repeating pattern of scrolls that were secured by a pleated fan motif. Brandt's commission for the entrance gate serves as a true testament to his reputation. Furthermore, Vogue describes the gates by saying, “What nobility there is in the doors which enter upon this exposition! One knows that something new surges in front of one. The grillings of the Palais de Justice, where lies all the grace of the eighteenth century, make one comprehend the richness of the decorative art of that time; the doors of the entrance of the International Exposition proclaim to Paris the advent of the decorative French art of 1925”.

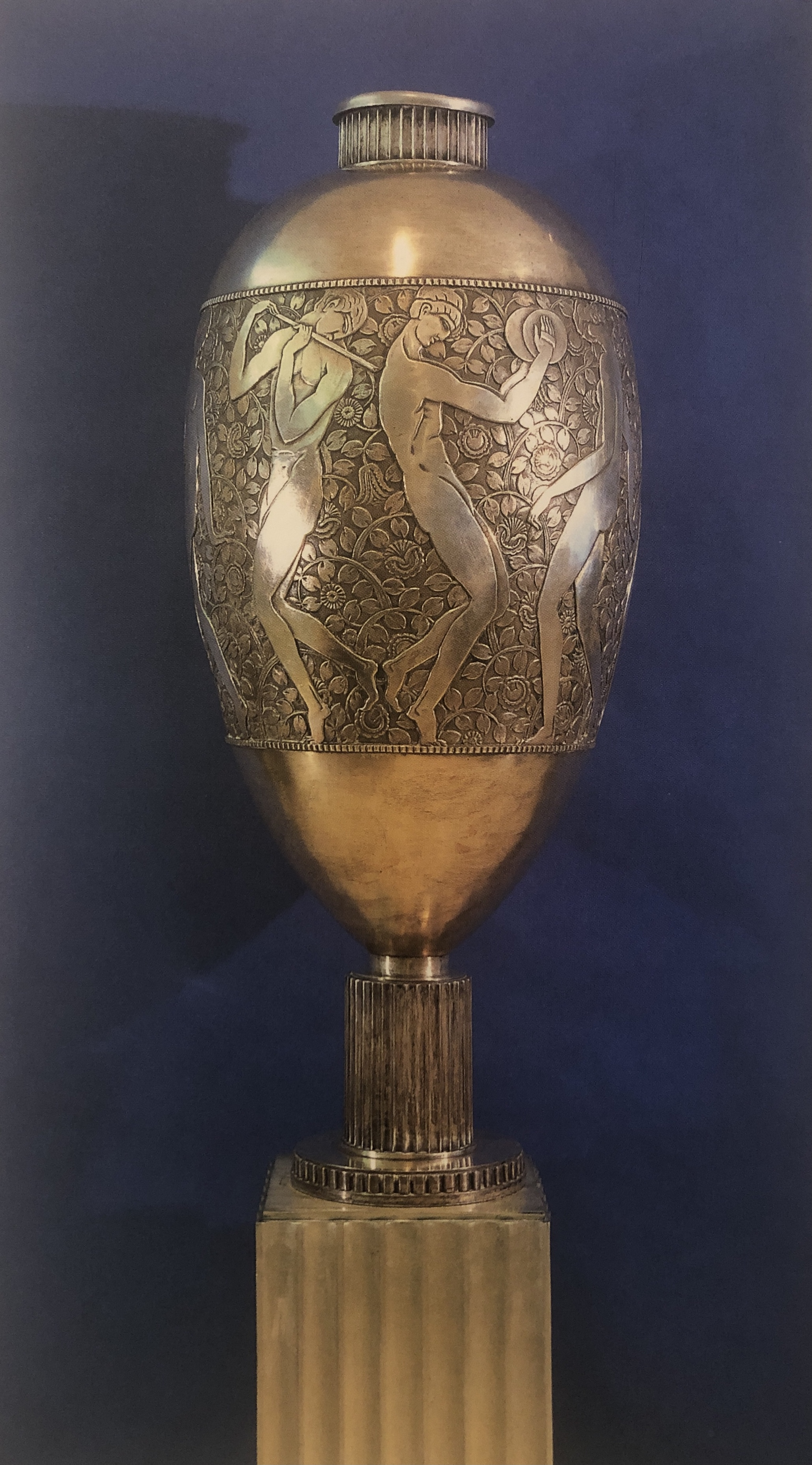
Potiche, 1925. Exhibited in Brandt's stand

Also showcased at the 1925 exposition was Brandt's own display room. In collaboration with the architect Favior, Brandt designed the interior of an octagon shaped room that was conceived as an entrance hall. This interior space was at great contrast with the other spaces showcased at the fair. Other designers primarily displayed spaces composed of wood furniture that was accented with glass, metal, or marble. On the contrary, the furniture placed within Brandt's room was constructed solely of metal that was accented by marble and glass. Favior placed great emphasis on the walls and the ceiling as he carefully selected colors that would complement Brandt's metalwork. Therefore, the walls and ceiling were finished in plaster that was painted in silver-gold and silver-gray tones to make it appear as if it were made of metal. These walls contained a vertical composition of motifs taken from the Egyptian culture. Although the rules explicitly stated not to imitate previous design styles, this wall shows “Brandt's ability to elicit the past in his work, while adding just enough original inspiration to make it appear fresh and current”. Additionally, one of the long walls located in the space was made of glass which gave a mirrored image of the room. One can only image how luxurious this space must have felt as the silver and gold tones of the walls, the ceiling, and even the furnishings in the room sparkled and glistened.

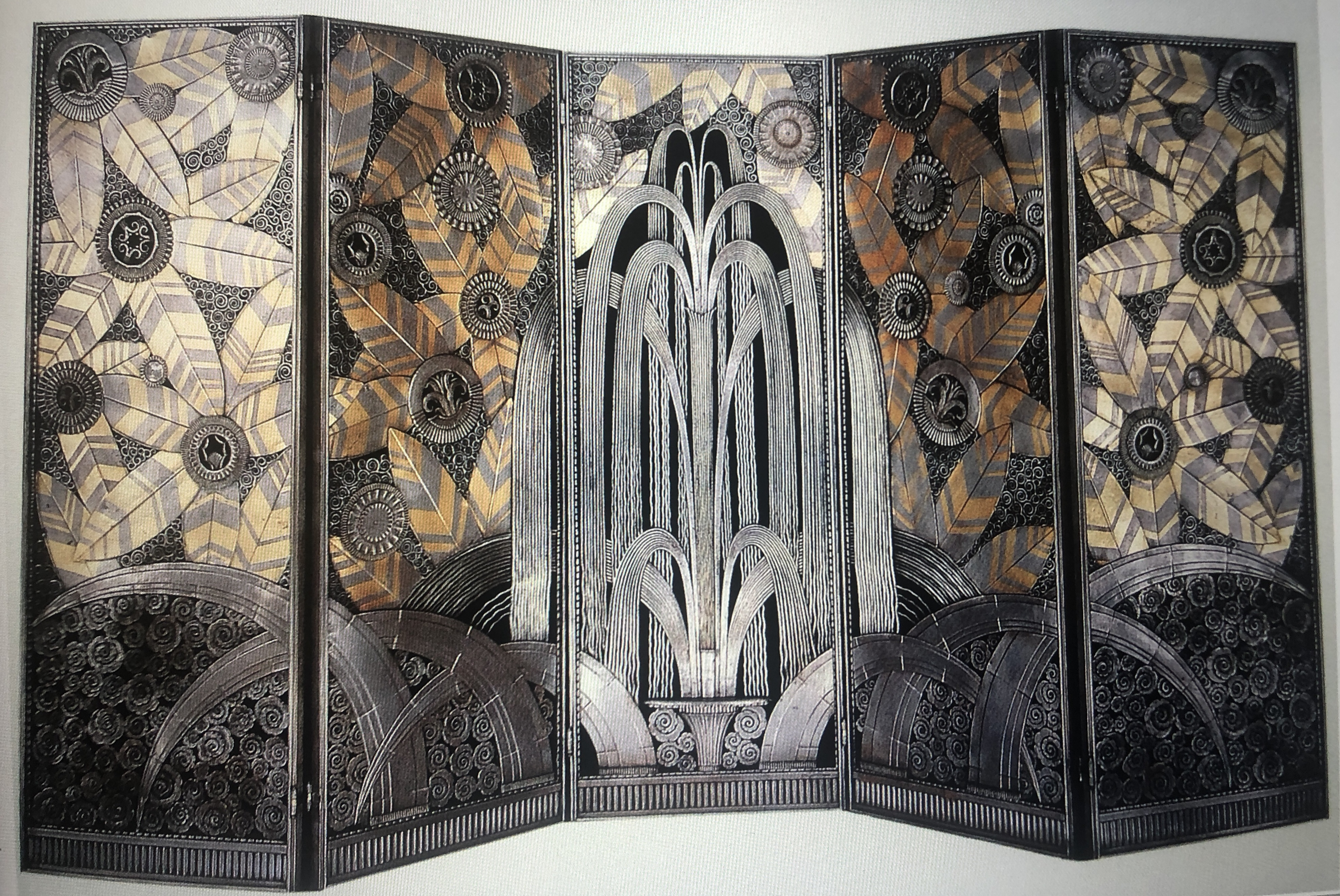
L'Oasis, Screen, 1924

Also on display within Brandt's display room was his most renowned work, L’Oasis. The five-panel screen was inspired by Jean Dunand's ancient Japanese lacquered screens. According to Joan Kahr, “The formal symmetry of the screen and the small scrolls reflect Brandt's early, classically feminine repertoire, while various newer elements allude to the emerging style moderne. The ripples of falling water and the crimped gearlike flowers also show the influence of a machine-inspired aesthetic, with its emphasis on movement and speed”. Through the use of stylized repetitive forms, Brandt is able to meld ancient decorative motifs with the modern focus on the machine. Although to the amateur eye the screen does not seem that complex, the technical superiority of its assembly provides proof of Brandt's sophistication as an ironworker. In 1925, L’Oasis became a well-known visual entity that was referenced on other decorative arts during that time. For example, the central fountain displayed on the screen as well as the foliage have been replicated on other works such as theater sets, perfume labels, and wallpapers.

Brandt's work can be found on the interior and exterior of other spaces throughout the fair. His work includes, doors, gates, stair railings, tables, chandeliers, lamps, sconces, and signs. Although Brandt had a successful career prior to his participation in the 1925 Exposition Internationale des Arts Decoratifs et Industriels Modernes, it was this fair that gave Brandt an international reputation for his ironwork.

== Public works ==
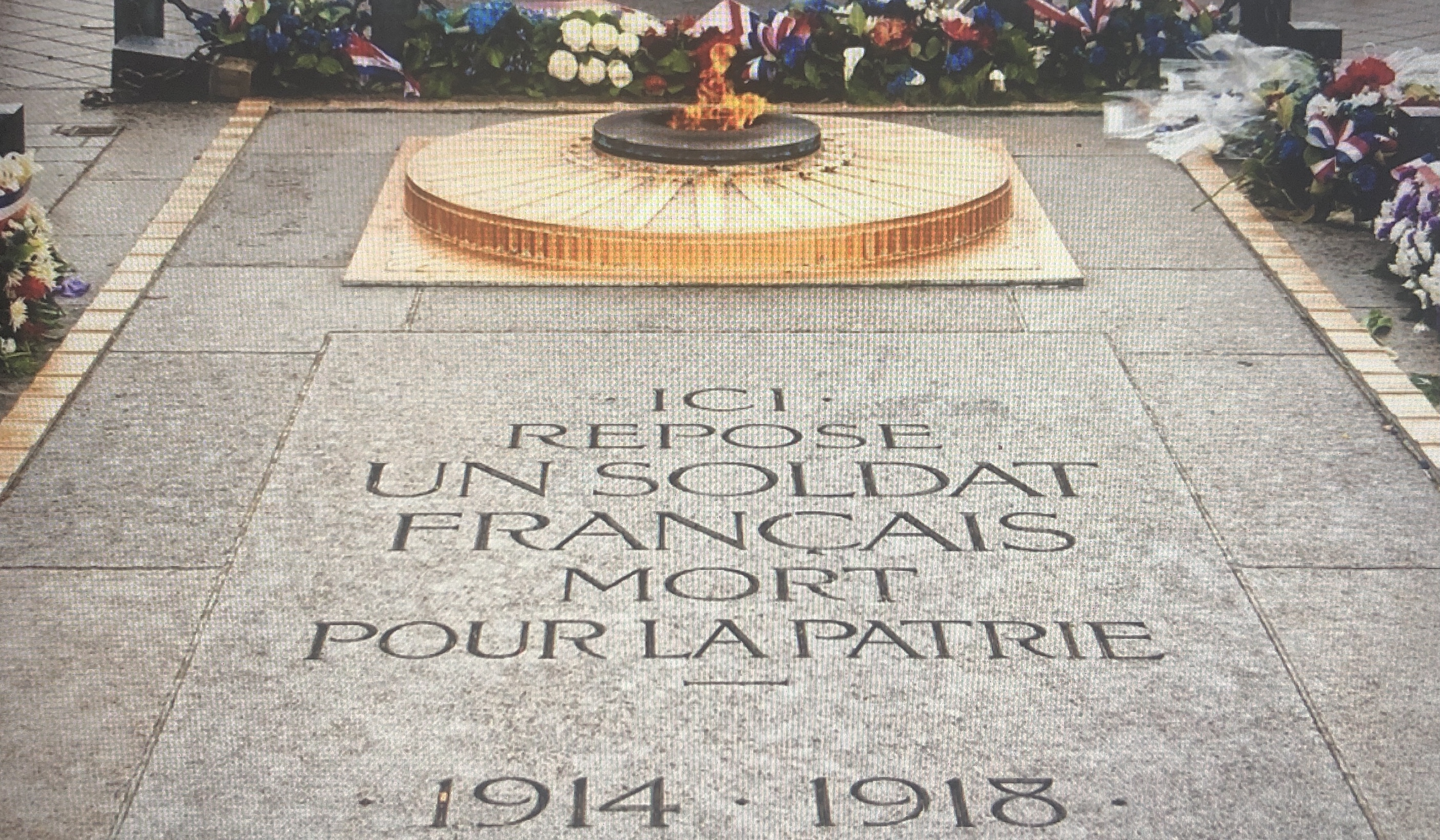
Eternal Flame, Tomb of the Unknown Soldier, Arc de Triumph, Paris

From Brandt's humble beginnings as a jewelry designer, his success in his large-scale pieces quickly led from private projects to public commissions. With World War I ending right around the height of Brandt's career, he was commissioned to design several war monuments that were placed throughout France.

In 1921, Brandt was commissioned to design the metalwork for the flaming circle and the surrounding bronze that would be at the head of the tomb of the unknown soldier located under the Arc de Triomphe in France. The monument can be described as “reflective and dignified”. At the head of the coffin, a square bronze plaque raises up a bronze circle that is covered in laurel leaves and berries. Located on top of the circle are twenty-four swords that radiate around the perimeter. The eternal flame which emanates from a sawed-off cannon head is located at the center of this circle. Running around this cannon head is a scalloped band of bronze that is a signature of Brandt.

Again, in 1921, Brandt was chosen to design the entry doors at the Bayonet Trench Monument on the Plateau of Thiaumont in Verdun. This monument is dedicated to the 300,000 soldiers who lost their lives after German bombardment caused the trench to cave in and bury the men alive. At the end of the battle, it was reported that the only thing that was visible were the bayonets sticking up out of the ground. As a way to remember the battle, Brandt designed doors that feature a laurel tree with “a long medieval two-edged broad-sword pointing down-ward” in front of the tree. Located on the top and bottom of the door, one will see a border of deeply hammered bayonets.

Seven years later, Brandt contributed to the dedication of another war memorial. This monument was to dedicate the cease-fire treaty signed by the Germans. At the center of the stone monument, Brandt designed a wrought-iron grille with a sword that appears to be piercing the body of a bronze eagle, the symbol of the German nation, that has fallen and been conquered. As a result of a misprinted newspaper article about the war memorial, Brandt decided to cover the cost of the metalwork for the memorial as a way of giving back to his country.

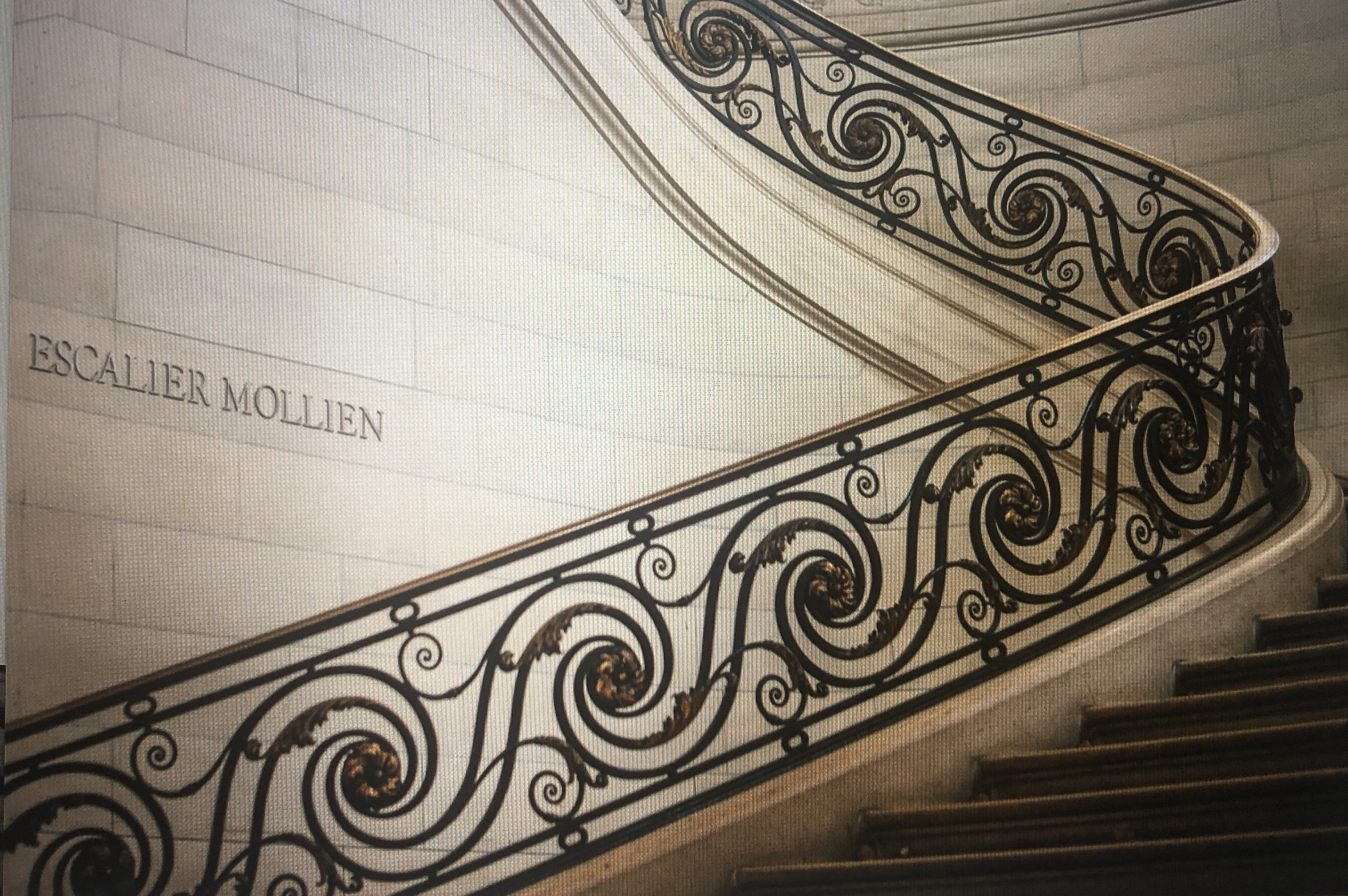
Escalier Mollien Staircase, Musee du Louvre, Paris

Probably one of Brandt's most important commissions to this date is his design of the Escalier Mollien staircase in the Louvre which was unveiled in 1914. Resembling that of a modern version of an eighteenth-century staircase, the banister and railing are composed of S- and C-shaped scrolls with gilded acanthus surrounding the rosettes. It has been said that “Brandt was justifiably proud of this state commission, and he used an illustration of the Escalier Mollien on his early 1920s adverting brochure”.

== Later works ==
As the years passed, the Art Deco style within Paris begins to change; “harmony and proportion had become more important than figurative decoration and color. Added to this was the move toward standardization and mass production”. Being aware of the changes around him, like he had in previous years, Brandt begin to adapt and change his design aesthetic. In his later work, one can see how Brandt's work shows a progression towards abstraction as a result of trying to reflect the new Modernist aesthetic. One of the most effective examples of Brandt's new abstract aesthetic can be seen in a 1927 radiator cover. This cover uses a series of triangles, rectangles and lines overlaid to create and abstract composition. The hammering displayed on the thick lines “offered the visual playfulness that had formerly been provided by lacelike C scrolls”.

== Products ==
Some of the products designed and built by Brandt's company and its successors include:

- Brandt 60 mm LR Gun-mortar
- Brandt Mle CM60A1 60 mm gun-mortar
- Brandt Mle 27/31 81 mm mortar
- Brandt Mle 1935 60 mm mortar
- Mortier 120 mm Rayé Tracté Modèle F1
- 37 mm Brandt 37/25 APDS projectile
- 90 mm Brandt ENERGA HEAT-FS projectile (see ELC AMX)
- Alabaster and Iron Torchiere Floor Lamp

== See also ==
- Raymond Subes

== Bibliography ==
- Goss, Jared (2014). French art deco. New York: Metropolitan Museum of Art. ISBN 978-1-58839-525-2.
- Kahr, Joan, ed. (2010). Edgar Brandt. art deco ironwork. Atglen, Pa: Schiffer. ISBN 978-0-7643-3666-9.
- Meech-Pekarik, Julia (1982). "Early Collectors of Japanese Prints and the Metropolitan Museum of Art". Metropolitan Museum Journal. 17: 93–118. doi:10.2307/1512790. ISSN 0077-8958. JSTOR 1512790.

== Further reading. ==
- McKeough, Tim. “Edgar Brandt .” Elle Decor, April 2013
- Editors of Encyclopaedia Britannica. “French West Africa.” Encyclopædia Britannica, Encyclopædia Britannica, Inc., www.britannica.com/place/French-West-Africa.
- K., J. “A Console Table by Edgar Brandt.” Calendar of the Art Institute of Chicago 66, no. 1 (January 1972): 14–15.
- Duncan, Alastair (1986). "Art Deco Lighting". The Journal of Decorative and Propaganda Arts. 1: 20–31. doi:10.2307/1503901. JSTOR 1503901.
