= Musée des Blindés =

Tank museum in France

Museum of Armoured Vehicles
- Musée des Blindés
- Location within France
- Established: 1977
- Location: Saumur, Maine-et-Loire
- Coordinates: 47°14′39″N 0°04′15″W
- Type: Military museum
- Website: www.museedesblindes.fr

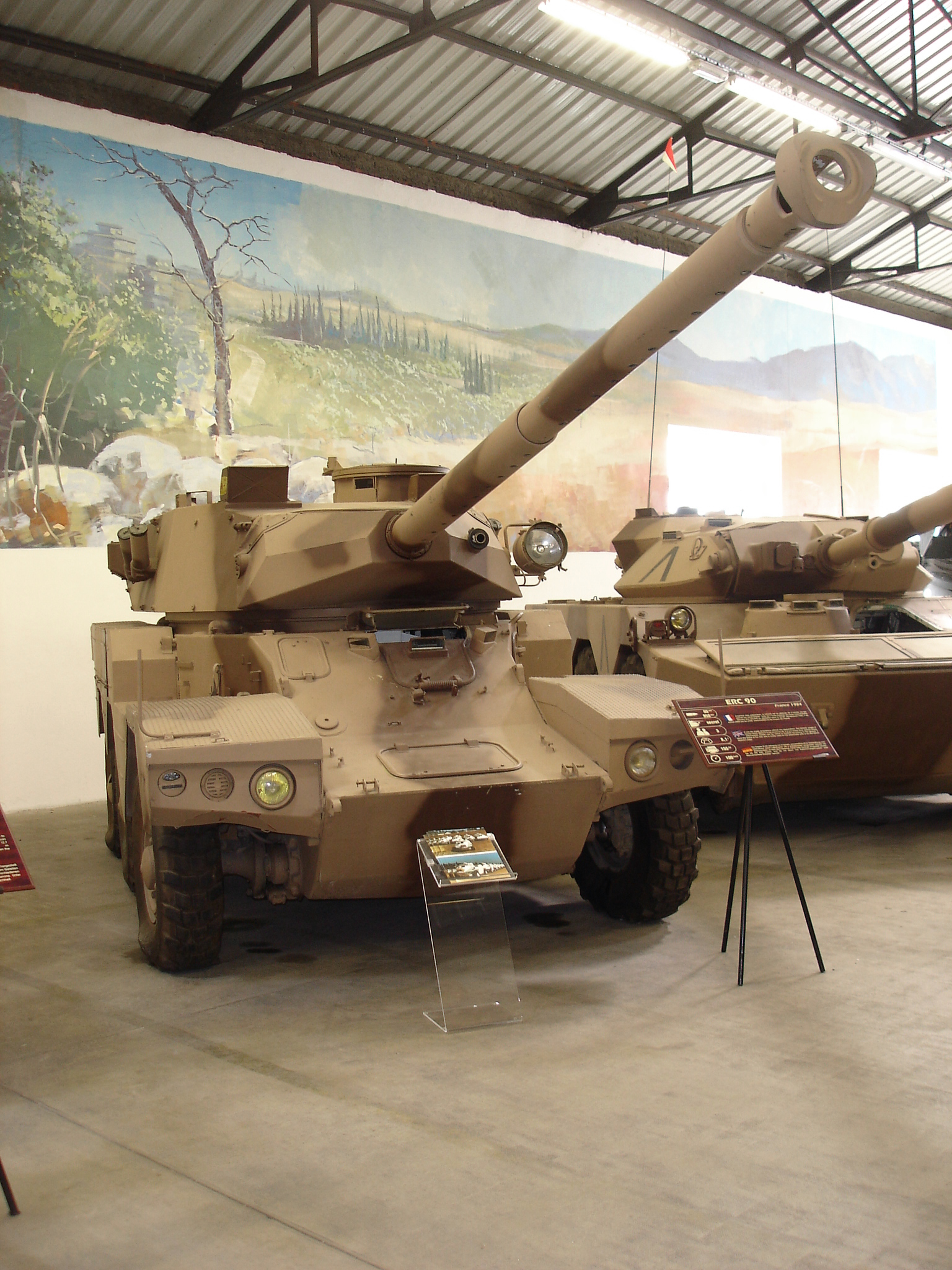
Panhard ERC-90

The Musée des Blindés, 'Museum of Armoured Vehicles' or Musée Général Estienne is a tank museum located in Saumur in the Loire Valley of France. It is now one of the world's largest tank museums.

== History ==
Saumur was the traditional training centre for cavalry for over a century, but now holds the Armoured Cavalry Branch Training School which is dedicated to training armour specialists. Musée des Blindés had its early origins in a study collection for the school. It began in 1977 under the leadership of Colonel Michel Aubry, who convinced both the French military hierarchy and the local political authorities. Starting with only a few hundred tracked vehicles, it is now a significant collection which attracts visitors interested in the history of multinational tank development as well as professional armor specialists. From the beginning, Aubry made it a key policy of the museum to restore historically or technically significant vehicles to running condition.

Musée des Blindés has the world's largest collection of armoured fighting vehicles and contains nearly 800 vehicles. Because of shortage of space, just 250 are exhibited, including vehicles from France, Germany, Russia, the United Kingdom, the United States. The museum moved to a larger building in 1993. It often performs in a public demonstration called the Carrousel, which takes place each summer.

== Exhibited vehicles ==
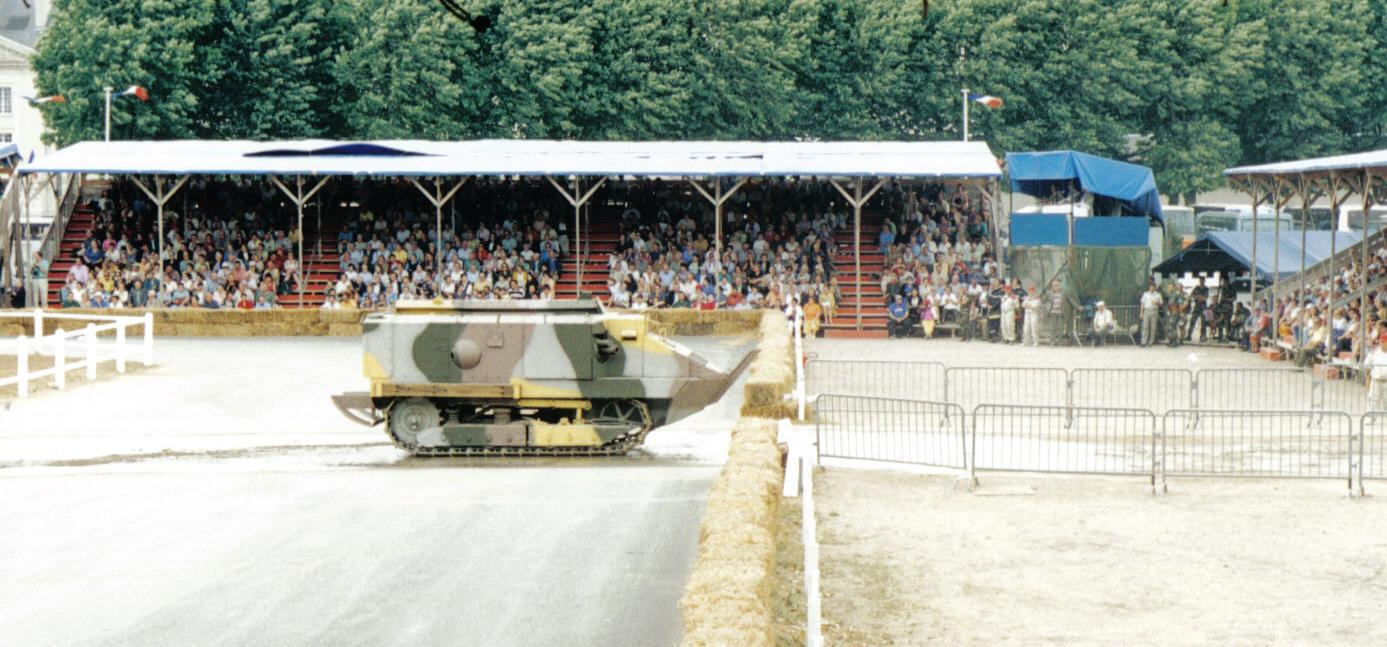
The oldest tank in running condition in the world, a Schneider CA1 (1916), participates in the annual Carrousel at Saumur.

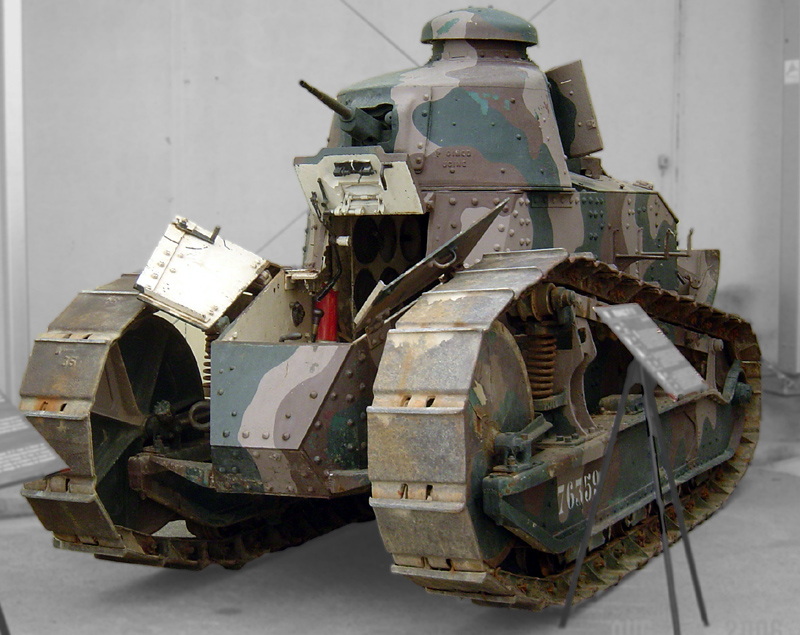
Renault FT

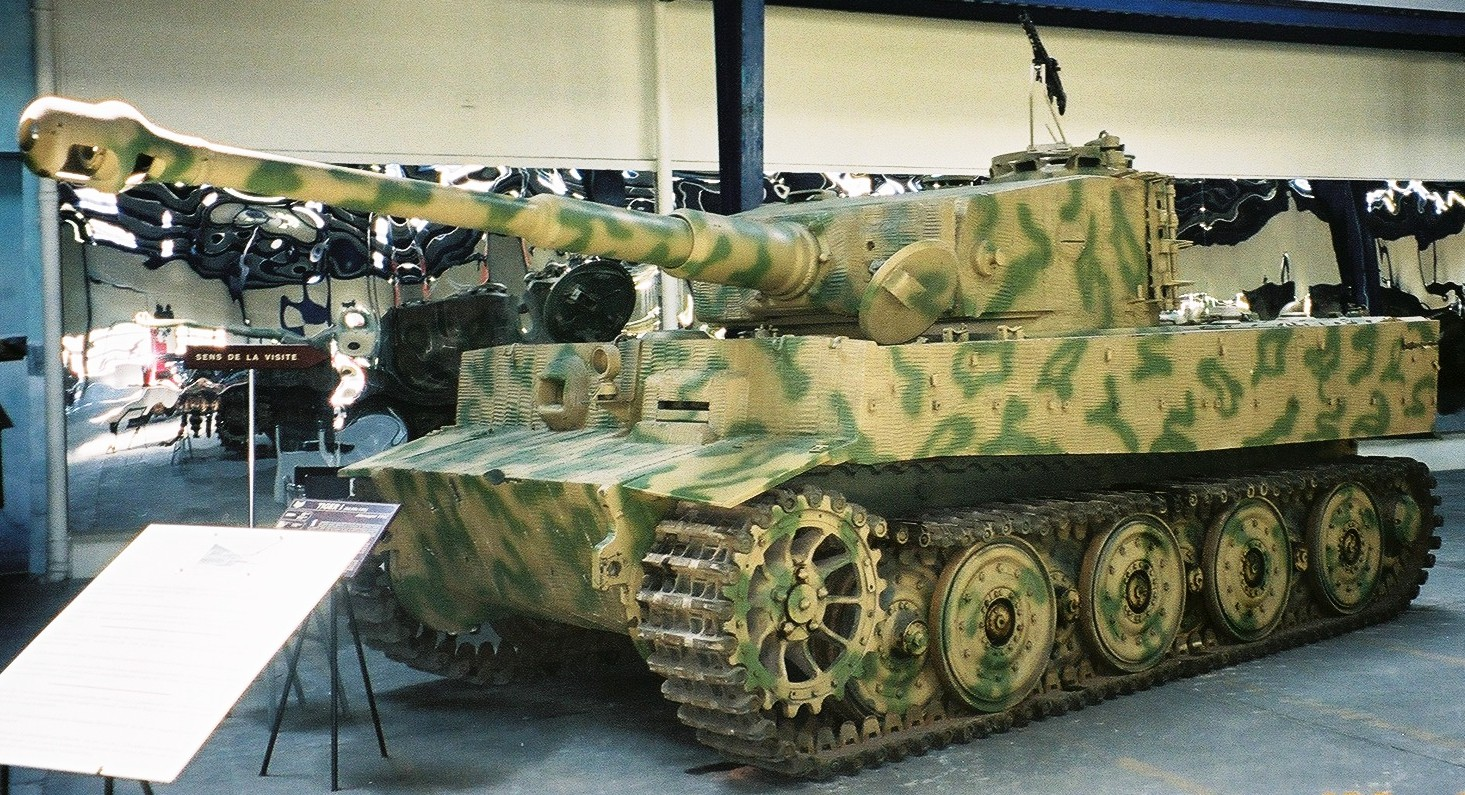
Tiger I

Armoured vehicles are presented in twelve themed rooms.

=== First World War ===
Four French vehicles are presented, some still in running condition: Schneider CA1, Saint-Chamond, Renault FT and a Renault truck.

=== French Campaign 1940 ===
All the main armoured vehicles in service in the French army are presented: Hotchkiss H39, Renault Char B1 bis, SOMUA S35, AMR 33 and Renault R35 amongst others.

=== Allied World War II ===
US (M3 Lee, M4 Sherman, GMC DUKW "Duck"), British (Matilda, Crusader, Churchill tank Mk V) as well as Soviet vehicles (KV-1, T-34, SU-100) are exhibited.

=== Germany World War II ===
28 well preserved German armored fighting vehicles are shown, including several Marder I, Marder III, Panzer II, Panzer III, Panzer IV, Tiger I (functioning), Tiger II (functioning), Jagdpanther and Panther.

=== Curiosity Room ===
This rooms includes some very odd vehicles, such as a Vespa 150 TAP carrying a 75 mm recoilless rifle, and some vehicles rebuilt for historical movies.

=== Warsaw Pact ===
A BMP-1, T-54, T-62, BTR-70, BRDM-2 and T-72 are the highlights of this section. Some of these are Iraqi tanks that were captured intact during the first Gulf War.

=== NATO ===
British (Centurion, Chieftain, Conqueror), US (M26 Pershing, M47 Patton, M48 Patton, M60 Patton) and West German tanks (Leopard 1, Leopard 2) are featured.

=== Post World War II France ===
There are some rare items in this section, including the AMX ELC bis, ARL 44, AMX-50, AMX-40, an AMX-30 with a nuclear tipped Pluton missile, as well as more common models such as the AMX-13, AMX-10P, AMX-10 RC, AMX 30 and the Leclerc.

All experimental French military vehicles developed that have been abandoned are kept here. The vast storage rooms are only accessible to special guests. There is an enormous library, archiving the records of the history of French armour. The museum was renamed after General Jean Baptiste Eugène Estienne, the creator of the French tank arm.

== See also ==
- Base Borden Military Museum – Canada
- Cavalry Tank Museum – India
- German Tank Museum – Germany
- Kubinka Tank Museum – Russia
- Military Technical Museum Lešany – Czech Republic
- Polish Army Museum – large collection of Soviet, western and Polish AFVs
- Parola Tank Museum – Finland
- The Tank Museum – United Kingdom
- U.S. Army Armor and Cavalry Collection
- Yad La-Shiryon – Israel
