= ELC project =

ELC AMX Prototype I (TC 901)
- ELC AMX Prototype I in 1956
- Type: Light tank, tank destroyer
- Place of origin: France

Production history
- Designer: AMX
- Designed: 1955-1959
- Manufacturer: SAMO (TC 901 turret)
- Produced: wasn't serially produced
- No. built: 2 prototypes and 4 turrets

Specifications
- Mass: 6.7 tonnes
- Length: 4.97 m (gun forward); 3.78 m (chassis)
- Width: 2.245 m
- Height: 1.58 m
- Crew: 2
- Armor: hull front - 15 mm, turret front and drive - 20 mm sides and rear - 8 mm
- Main armament: 1x 90 mm D.914 cannon (36 rounds)
- Secondary armament: 1x 7.5mm AAT-52 coaxial machine gun (1050 rounds), planned 4x smoke grenade launchers
- Engine: SOFAM Type 4 GSd A 164 hp at 3600 RPM
- Power/weight: 26 hp/t
- Suspension: torsion bar
- Ground clearance: 280 mm
- Fuel capacity: 360 liters
- Maximum speed: 68 km/h

ELC AMX bis
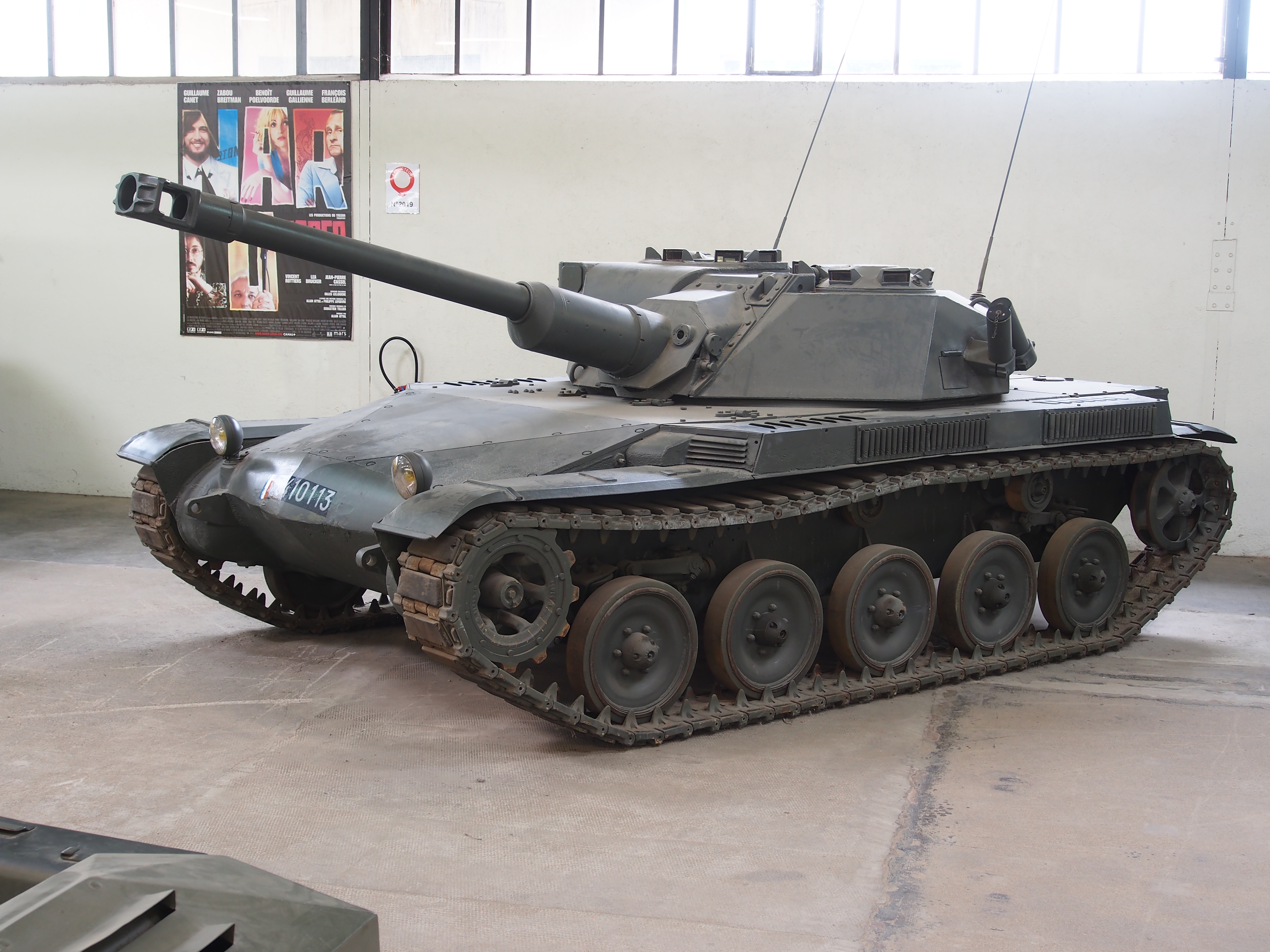
- ELC AMX bis in the Musée des Blindés
- Type: Light tank, tank destroyer
- Place of origin: France

Production history
- Designer: AMX
- Designed: 1957-1961
- Manufacturer: CAFL (TC 904 turret)
- Produced: wasn't serially produced
- No. built: 1 hull

Specifications
- Mass: 8.92 tonnes
- Length: 5.11 m (gun forward); 4.2 m (chassis)
- Width: 2.42 m
- Height: 1.7 m
- Crew: 2
- Armor: front - 20mm/80° (top), 40mm (middle); sides - 15mm; rear - 15mm/20° (upper rear plate), 15mm/45° (lower rear plate)
- Main armament: 1x 90mm D.915 cannon (53 rounds)
- Secondary armament: 1x 7.5mm AAT-52 coaxial machine gun (1450 rounds), 4x smoke grenade launchers
- Engine: SOFAM Type 4 GSr; 180 hp at 3500 RPM
- Power/weight: 20 hp/t
- Suspension: torsion bar
- Ground clearance: 350 mm
- Fuel capacity: 340 liters
- Maximum speed: 80 km/h

The ELC project was a prototype light tank project launched by the French Ministry of Defense in 1955. The purpose of the ELC (Engin Léger de Combat, Light combat vehicle) project was to develop a lightly armoured, heavily armed fighting vehicle capable of being airlifted for rapid deployment.

== ELC AMX series ==
=== History ===
With the emergence of the Soviet Union's T-10 and T-54 tanks in the late 1940s, featuring powerful cannon and thick armour, a number of NATO countries needed armored vehicles armed with sufficiently powerful weapons to effectively destroy them. In the mid-1950s, the US Army developed tanks with equally powerful armor and large-caliber guns firing high-velocity armor-piercing ammunition (such as M103 heavy tank), while the UK was developing more modern APDS and HESH ammunition. Besides the char 50 tonnes program (AMX-50), the French command took a different approach and commissioned the development of a lightly armored vehicle armed with a gun with high penetration capabilities — at least 300 mm — for engaging tanks at a range of at least one kilometer, as well as the ability to engage infantry.

=== Development and testing of prototypes ===
Drawings and documentation for the ELC AMX with the TC901 turret appeared as early as September 4, 1955. To create two prototypes of the "light combat vehicle," AMX chose the Hotchkiss CC2 armored personnel carrier design. The design was modified by removing the cargo compartment and replacing it with an enclosed fighting compartment and equipping it with a more powerful engine. On March 14, 1956, the first turret, designated TC901 (tourelle-casemate, French for "casemate turret"), was manufactured for the Prototype I (chassis №1), mounting a 90mm D.914 cannon and manual gun and turret traverse. On March 15, 1956, the tests have begun. Due to a delay in the delivery of the engine power battery, it lacked a working ventilation system to vent gases from fired machine gun rounds and tank charges. As early as April 1956, firing tests showed an effective firing range of 600 m, and the HEAT round penetrated up to 350 mm of steel armor.

On June 28, 1956, a drawing of the TC902 turret with a rangefinder was completed.

On October 15, 1957, a drawing of the enlarged TC903 turret for mounting the D.915 cannon was completed.

On June 15, 1958, the AMX Research and Development Service in Satory issued a document comparing the turrets of the ELC AMX and ELC Even designs. The existence of mock-ups of the TC904 and TC30 turrets and their technical equipment was already known at the time.

On January 25, 1959, drawings and documentation were completed for the ELC AMX with a TC.904 turret equipped with a rangefinder and hydraulic traverse drive.

In April 1959, a design was developed for mounting a turret with a Hispano-Suiza HS.831 automatic cannon for both ground and anti-aircraft fire. Only a mock-up was produced.

On May 25, 1959, the Prototype II (chassis №2) developed several issues with the gearbox (primarily related to wear on the input shaft splines and the reverse gear pinion). This, in addition to urgent repairs to existing parts and the manufacture of new ones, necessitated modifications.

On October 28, 1959, the Prototype I was fitted with the TC902 turret, armed with a 90 mm D.914 gun firing fin-stabilized HEAT projectiles. Overall, the tank design was a success, but the dimensions of the turret needed to be adjusted and the projectile velocity increased. The Prototype II was fitted with the TC903 turret, armed with a 90 mm D.915 gun firing the "obus G" HEAT projectiles. The TC904 turret carried an identical gun, but was better equipped, featuring an optical rangefinder and a hydraulically powered aiming system. This turret could also be fitted on the ELC bis. Due to the superior design of the 904 turret, the second prototype needed to be immediately modified and replaced with this turret. All changes to both prototypes were to be completed by December 1, 1959.

=== Tank destroyer design ===
Armament

The first prototypes were equipped with low-pressure 90mm D.914 gun, capable of firing specially-designed empennée (French for feathered, meaning fin-stabilized) HEAT rounds. Since the firing range of the D.914 gun did not meet the requirements for the French Ministry of Defense, a slightly elongated D.915 gun equipped with a muzzle brake was developed. Especially for this cannon, a new model of the turret called 903 was designed — it had larger capacity. The early standard round for the D.914, designated Energa, weighed 2 kg, had muzzle velocity of 600 m/s and was capable of penetrating up to 350mm of rolled homogenous steel armor, but it also had an insufficiently low effective firing range — between 600 and 700 meters. Later, shells of the same type were developed, such as OCC 90-62 (3.6 kg, 750 m/s), and unnamed shell with deployed fins (4.8 kg, 600 m/s). The round subjected for testing for D.915 was the «obus G»: it weighed 7.5 kg, achieved 700 m/s of muzzle velocity, and made it possible to achieve the effective firing range of up to 1000 meters, but at that time it wasn't possible to increase this range to the originally requested 1 500 meters or more.

All versions of the tank had a coaxial 7.5 mm tank-adapted AAT-52 light machine gun, and, within the ELC TC 904 variant, two pairs of smoke grenade launchers located on the sides of the turret were introduced.

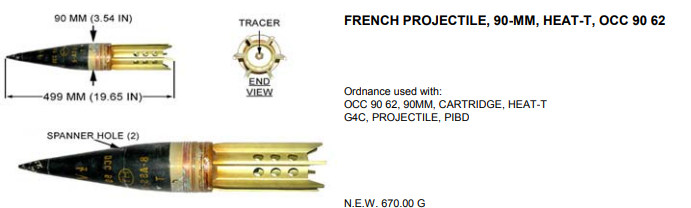
90mm OCC 90-62 (obus à charge creuse) HEAT-FS-T projectile, fired by D.914 gun of ELC AMX Prototype I.

Turret

A total of 4 turrets were developed for the two ELC prototypes. Prototype I had carried TC 901 and TC 902, Prototype II had carried TC 903 and TC 904. A distinctive feature of these turrets was the so-called casemate design (French: tourelle casemate). On the move the turret's rotation was limited to about 30-36°, because with more turret rotation the driver (located on the floor of the vehicle) was unable to access the tank's controls. To fully rotate the turret and aim at the target, the tank had to stop, for driver and commander to move around the available space inside the tank. Despite such a disadvantage, this layout made the tank destroyer have very low profile and high mobility. The close location of both crew members in the turret ensured a high concentration on gun control — while the driver loaded ammunition and operated the machine gun, the tank commander fired the main gun.

TC 902 and TC 904 turrets were equipped with an optical rangefinder (the latter having L.995) for more effective engagement of their targets. The TC 904 turret was also equipped with hydraulic powered horizontal drive, achieving 24 deg/s of traverse speed (the rest of the turrets had horizontal traverse speed of 6 deg/s). All the turrets had vertical traverse speed of 2 deg/s. Prototype I was fitted with AV/VRC 7 radio device, while the Prototype II had AN/GRC 4. The initial prototypes of the ELC AMX did not have automatized ammo rack, which was widely used on French tanks at that time, such as AMX-13. However, interior photos of the TC 904 turret had shown the presence of first-stage ammo rack with four-round capacity. Its presence in the rear of the turret had probably made reload process easier and quicker for the driver.

Mobility

The ELC AMX prototypes were equipped with a SOFAM Type 4 GSd A in-line, four-cylinder, liquid-cooled gasoline engine with magnetic ignition. The engine displacement was 4.728 liters, with a bore of 112 mm and a stroke of 120 mm. The compression ratio was 6.72. Engine power at 3600 RPM was 164 hp, with peak torque reaching 373 N⋅m at 2400 RPM. The battery voltage was 24 V. The fuel tank capacity was 360 liters. The Ford gearbox had four forward gears (three of which were synchronized) and one reverse, allowing for a top speed of 42 mph (68 km/h) on the highway. The average speed on level roads was 40–50 km/h, while off-road driving ranged from 18 to 25 km/h. Depending on the prototype, either the Ferodo Type 12 LF (№1) or Gravina (№2) clutch systems were used. Turning was provided by a Cleveland-type differential, with a turning radius of 4.75 m. Fuel consumption was 62 l/100 km on the highway, while off-road driving consumed 25 liters of gasoline per hour. The total cruising range was 580 km on the highway and 14 hours off-road.

=== Anti-air variant ===
A mock-up of anti-air self-propelled gun variant of ELC AMX was built, featuring 30mm Hispano-Suiza in a hydraulically powered TC 30 turret.

== ELC AMX bis ==
It was decided to increase the armor of the ELC AMX hull and strengthen the chassis, as the chassis of the CC.2 armored personnel carrier was becoming unusable due to the significantly increased weight of the vehicle (for example, the second prototype had experienced issues with clutch, transmission and idler wheel). The first technical documentation on the Prototype bis appeared on July, 25, 1957. In 1961, a new hull was assembled, with cast steel armor up to 40 mm thick in front, which was located at a high slope (up to 80 degrees). The new chassis was provided with five pairs of smaller diameter rollers and three return rollers. The mass of the tank has increased – it had reached 8.92 tons. The new hull contained 34 projectiles, another 19 were located in the TC 904 turret. The fuel capacity of the tank, however, has slightly decreased to 340 liters as well as the cruising range – down to 500 km.

The armament and turret were inherited from the latest ELC AMX TC 904 prototype – the tank's D.915 gun that fired «obus G» rounds. The AAT-52 light machine gun, four smoke grenades (loaded into two grenade launchers per turret side) and 1.2 meter-wide optical rangefinder were also featured on the TC 904 turret. In case of power malfunction, commander-gunner could traverse the turret manually: per two revolutions of the handle, turret turned by 6 degrees, the gun elevated or depressed by 2 degrees. Left part of the rangefinder served as a gunner sight for driver, helping the tank commander to aim. Other optics consisted of five driver viewports and eight commander viewports, the latter ones offering full panoramic view. The tank had a gasoline 4-cylinder SOFAM Type 4 GSr engine, capable of reaching 180 horsepower at 3500 RPM, which, with a specific power of 20 h.p./t., allowed the vehicle to reach 80 km/h of max speed, a record for ELC project vehicles. The average speed, however, was about 60 km/h, the cross-country speed was limited to 30 km/h. In total, the tank had six forward and four reverse gears (three forward gears and two reverse gears paired with a reduction drive).

At the end of development in 1961, the Engin Léger de Combat program was recognized as not promising, and the work on the project was discontinued, and the ELC AMX bis was set on display as an exhibit in the Museum of Armored Vehicles in Saumur until the second half of the year of 2017, when it was moved to the museum's military reserve and hidden from public eyes.

== ELC Even series ==
The ELC Even was a series of light tanks created in competition with AMX's proposals. These prototypes featured an oscillating turret with a cupola for the gunner located along the turret centerline. The turret itself was offset to the left in order to make room for a driver's compartment in the hull.

=== ELC Even 30 ===
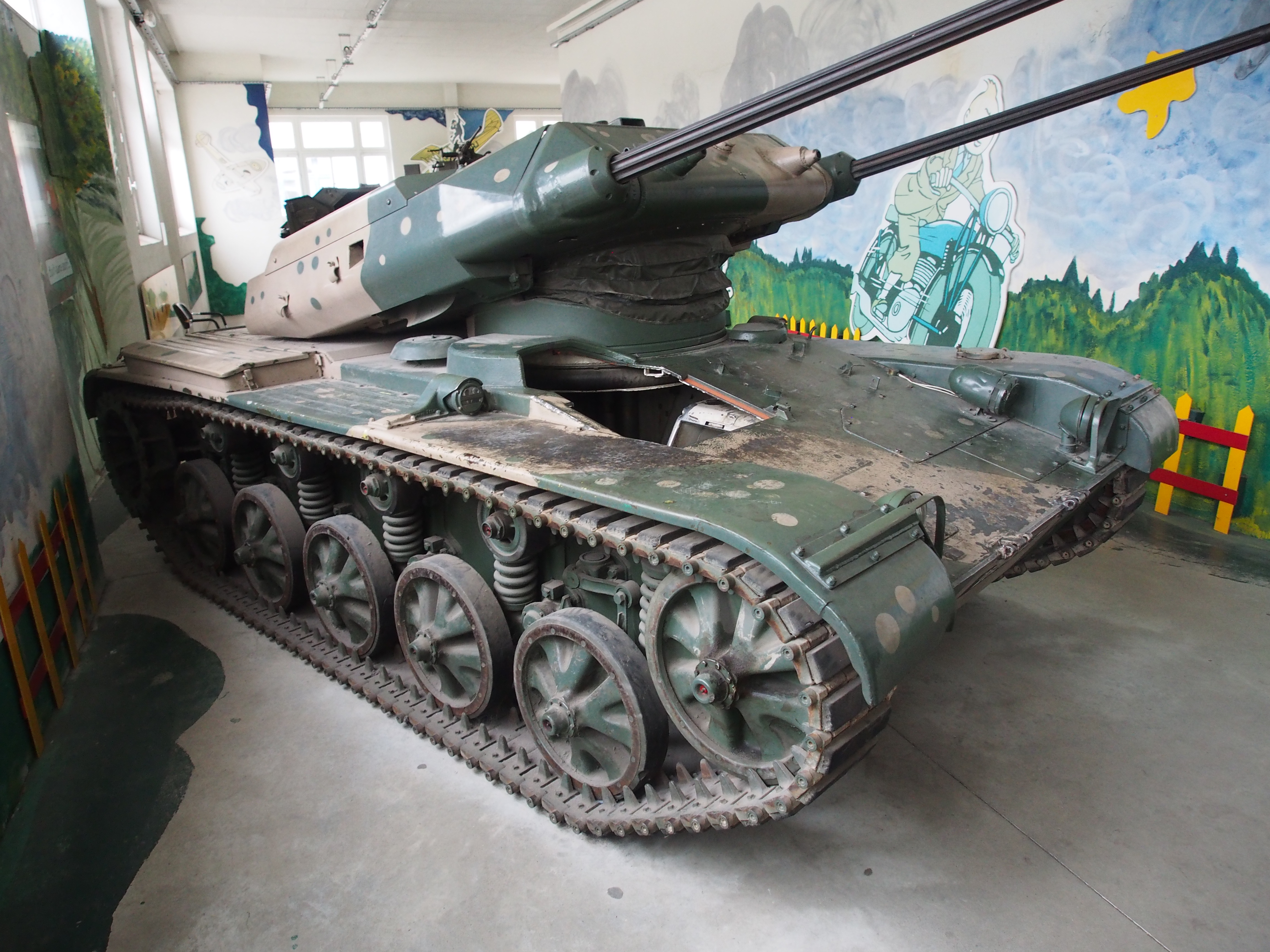
ELC Even 30 prototype at Musée des Blindés

The ELC Even 30 was armed with twin 30mm Hispano-Suiza autocannons with fluted barrels mounted on either side of the turret, with two machine guns mounted slightly inboard of these weapons.

=== ELC Even 90 ===
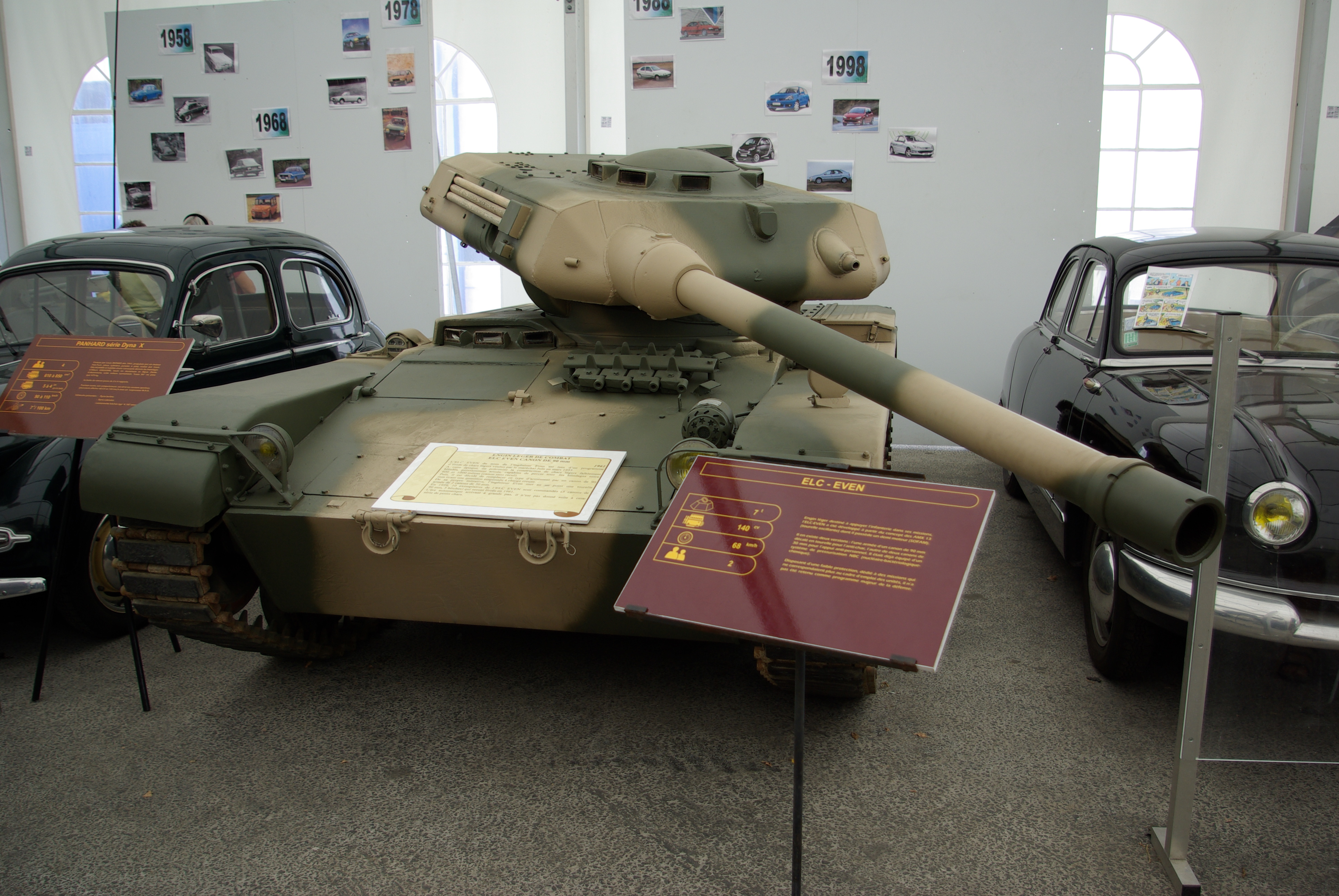
ELC Even 90 prototype at Musée des Blindés

The ELC Even 90 featured a turret very similar to that of the ELC Even 30, but replaced both 30mm guns and the right-side machinegun with a single low-pressure 90mm D919 gun using 700m/sec HEAT rounds type G, on the right side of the turret.

=== ELC Even 120 ===
The ELC Even 120 featured four 120 mm recoilless rifles arranged in horizontal pairs on either side of the turret. These weapons were to be reloaded by the driver either by rotating the turret so that the driver could open his hatch and insert new projectiles without leaving his seat, or by having the driver climb out and reload the weapons from a standing position next to the tank. It was also suggested that the rear ends of the 120mm weapons' barrels be cut so that the rear sections could be rotated into the turret, allowing the gunner to reload the weapons without opening his hatch.

Another version of the tank featuring two 120mm weapons, each with a five-round revolver-type autoloader, was suggested but not constructed.

=== ELC Even – Nord-Aviation missiles ===
A vehicle armed with either four SS-11 ATGMs or two SS-12 SSMs mounted on arms on either side of a purpose-built welded plate turret, with an armored glass observation window on its front. A prototype featuring a combination of these weapons (two SS-11 on the right side of the turret and one SS-12 on the left) was built.
