= Brandt Mle 1935 =

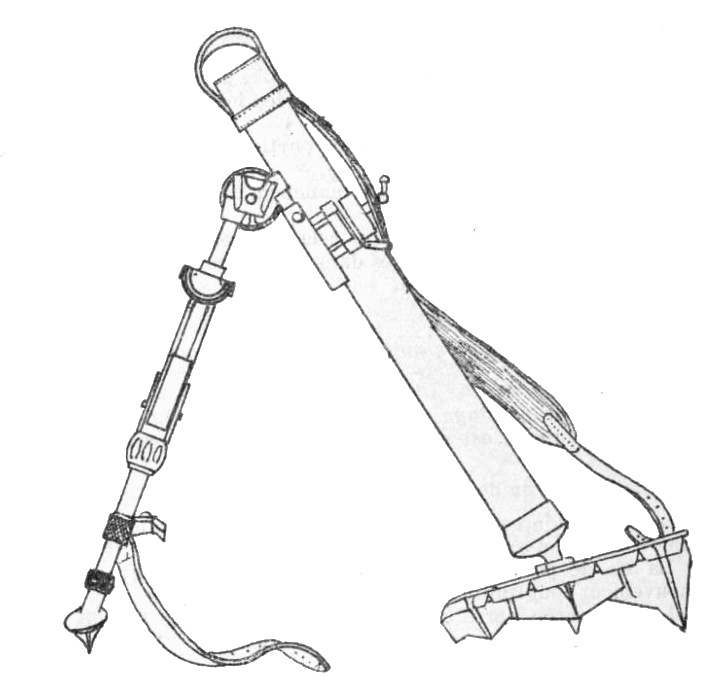
- Side view of the Brandt Mle 1935
- Type: Mortar
- Place of origin: France

Service history
- Wars: World War II; Second Sino-Japanese War; Chinese Civil War; First Indochina War; Algerian War; Vietnam War; Laotian Civil War; Cambodian Civil War; Portuguese Colonial War

Production history
- Designer: Edgar Brandt
- No. built: Over 4,900 (before 1940)
- Variants: Brandt Mle 1935 modifié 1944

Specifications
- Mass: 19.7 kg (43 lb 7 oz)
- Barrel length: 72.4 cm (2 ft 5 in)
- Crew: 5
- Cartridge: Light HE shell: 1.3 kg (2 lb 14 oz); Heavy HE shell: 2.2 kg (4 lb 14 oz)
- Caliber: 60.7 mm (2.39 in)
- Rate of fire: 20-26 rounds per minute
- Muzzle velocity: 158 m/s (520 ft/s)
- Effective firing range: Light HE shell: 100 m (330 ft) to 1.7 km (1.1 mi); Heavy HE shell: 100 m (330 ft) to .95 km (0.59 mi)
- Filling weight: Light HE shell: 160 g (5.6 oz)

The Brandt Mle 1935 60-mm mortar (French: Mortier de 60 mm Mle 1935) was a company-level indirect-fire weapon of the French army during the Second World War. Designed by Edgar Brandt, it was copied by other countries, such as the United States and China, as well as purchased and built by Romania. Modified in 1944, the mortar continued to be used by France after the war until at least the 1960s.

== Description ==
The Brandt Mle 1935 was a simple and effective weapon, consisting of a smoothbore metal tube fixed to a base plate (to absorb recoil), with a lightweight bipod mount. The team of the Mle 1935 was made of five men: a leader, a firer, an artificer and two suppliers. When a mortar bomb was dropped into the tube, an impact-sensitive primer in the base of the bomb would make contact with a firing pin at the base of the tube, and detonate, igniting a gunpowder charge, which would propel the bomb out of the tube, and towards the target.

HE mortar bombs fired by the weapon weighed 1.33 kilograms. A French infantry company in 1940 was allocated one Mle 1935 mortar.

This weapon provided a pattern for other light mortars used during World War II. Among the best known is the U.S. 60-mm M2 mortar. Captured examples were used by the Germans as the 6 cm Granatwerfer 225(f).

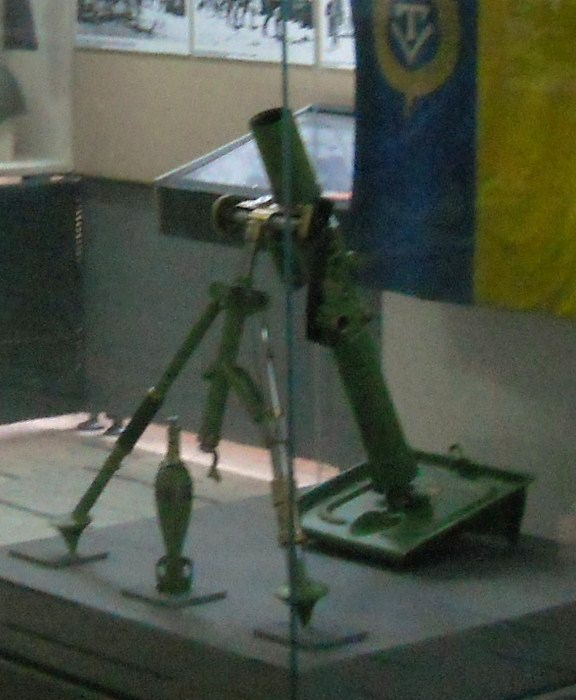
A Romanian-made Mle 1935 mortar in the National Military Museum, Romania.

Romania also purchased and license-built the Mle 1935 mortar prior to and during the Second World War. The mortars were produced at the Voina Works in Brașov, with a production rate of 26 pieces per month as of October 1942.

Viet Minh also locally produced the mortar 60mm Brandt MLE1935 during the First Indochina War.

== Users ==
- France
- United States
- Nazi Germany
- Portugal
- Kingdom of Romania
- Taiwan
- Cambodia
- Kingdom of Laos
- North Vietnam

== See also ==
- M2 mortar
