= List of infantry mortars =

This list catalogues mortars which are issued to infantry units to provide close range, rapid response, indirect fire capability of an infantry unit in tactical combat. In this sense the mortar has been called "infantryman's artillery", and represents a flexible logistic solution to the problem of satisfying unexpected need for delivery of firepower, particularly for the light infantry. In general, infantry mortars are defined by what a team of infantrymen, sometimes known as mortarmen, can transport unaided by significant vehicle support. Because of this intrinsic restriction mandated by weight, mortars are only considered "infantry" with a calibre of up to 120 mm. These larger weapons usually require wheeled assemblies to allow their towing either by hand or by light tactical vehicles.

Caliber (mm)	Weapon name	Country of origin	Period	Weight (kg)
37	37mm Mortar Shovel	Soviet Union	World War II	1.5
40	1.57 inch Medium Mortar	United Kingdom	World War I	48
45	Brixia Model 35	Italy	World War II	15.5
46	Granatnik wz.36	Poland	World War II	8
47	Grk m/40	Sweden	World War II	11.7
47	47 Krh/39	Finland	World War II	
47	47 Krh/41	Finland	World War II	3.2
50	Lance Grenades de 50 mm modèle 37	France	World War II	3.6
50	5 cm lGrW 36	Nazi Germany	World War II	14
50	Type 10 grenade discharger	Japan	World War II	2.3
50	Type 89 Grenade Discharger	Japan	World War II	4.7
50	Type 98 50 mm Mortar	Japan	World War II	22.5
50	QLT-89	China	Cold War	3.8
50	LGI Mle F1	France	Modern	4.8
50	50-PM-38	Soviet Union	World War II	12.1
50	50-PM-39	Soviet Union	World War II	14
50	50-PM-40	Soviet Union	World War II	12.1
50	50-PM-41	Soviet Union	World War II	
51	L9A1 51 mm Light Mortar	United Kingdom	Modern	6.275
51	51 mm E1	India	Modern	4.88
51	Madsen 51mm Advanced Field Mortar	Denmark	World War II / Cold War	17.4
52	2 inch Medium Trench Mortar/2-inch Howitzer	United Kingdom	World War I	48
52	SBML 2-Inch	United Kingdom	World War II	4.8
58.3	Mortier de 58 mm type 2 "Crapouillot"	France	World War I	301
60	Granatenwerfer 16	German Empire	World War I	88
60	60 COM 97	Finland	Modern	16.8
60	Type 63 mortar	China	Cold War	
60	Type 89 (PP-89) mortar	China	Cold War	
60	Type 93 (PP-93) mortar	China	Cold War	
60	Type 201 (PBP-201) mortar	China	Modern	
60	Brandt Mle 1935	France	World War II	19.05
60	M2	United States	World War II	19.05
60	M19	United States	Cold War	9.3 (M1 mount); 23.4 (M5 mount)
60	LM-60	Poland	Modern	18.2
60	LMP-2017	Poland	Modern	6.6
60	M224	United States	Cold War	21.1
60	HM 12	Iran		6.25
60	HM 13	Iran		6.25
60	HM 14	Iran		17.5
60	BA-100 commando mortar	Myanmar	Cold War / Modern	
60	MA-7 extended range mortar	Myanmar	Modern	
60	MA-9 commando mortar	Myanmar	Modern	
60	Morteirete 60 mm m/968	Portugal	Portuguese Colonial War	5.5
60	Brandt 60mm LR Gun-mortar	France	Cold War	75
60	FMK-1/FMK-2/FMK-3	Argentina	Cold War / Modern	
60	Hirtenberger M6C-210	Austria	Modern	5.1
60	M6 mortar	Austria	Modern	23.1
60	M121A1/A2 mortar	Thailand	Modern	
60	M121A3 Commando mortar	Thailand	Modern	
60	M949 AGR	Brazil	Modern	19.06
60	MKEK 60mm Commando Mortar	Turkey	Modern	7.730
60.7	60 mm vzor 99 Antos light mortar	Czech Republic	Modern	
65	Garland trench mortar	United Kingdom	World War I	
65	Cellerier Mortar	France	World War I	
70	Type 11 70 mm Infantry Mortar	Japan	World War II	63
75	Mortier de 75 modèle 1915 Schneider	France	World War I	215
75.8	7.58 cm Minenwerfer	German Empire	World War I	147
76.2	Davidka	Israel	1948 Arab-Israeli war	
80	8 cm Luftminenwerfer M 15	Austria-Hungary	World War I	
81	8 cm minomet vz. 36	Czechoslovakia	World War II	62
81	BA-90 mortar	Myanmar	Modern	
81	MA-8 extended range mortar	Myanmar	Modern	
81	8 cm sGrW 34	Nazi Germany	World War II	57
81	Kz 8 cm GrW 42	Nazi Germany	World War II	26.5
81	Brandt mle 27/31	France	World War II	56
81	Mortaio da 81/14 Modello 35	Italy	World War II	59.56
81	81 mm E1	India		
81	M221A2 mortar	Thailand	Modern	
81	HM 15	Iran		51.7
81	LLR 81mm	France	Modern	44
81	L16	United Kingdom	Modern	41.3
81	81 Krh/33	Finland	World War II	58
81	81 Krh/35	Finland	World War II	63
81	81 Krh/36 T	Finland	World War II	60.5
81	81 Krh/38	Finland	World War II	64
81	81 Krh 56 Y	Finland	Cold War	37
81	81 Krh 58 P	Finland	Cold War	40
81	81 Krh 64 Y	Finland	Cold War	45
81	81 KRH 71 Y	Finland	Cold War	56
81	81 KRH 96	Finland	Modern	56
81	Type 97 81 mm infantry mortar	Japan	World War II	67
81	MKEK 81mm UT1	Turkey	Modern	71; 2
81	MKEK 81mm NT1	Turkey	Modern	58; 85
81	M1	United States	World War II	61.5
81	M29	United States	Cold War	55.1
81	M252	United States	Modern	41.3
81	M-81 mortar	Poland	Modern	
81	FMK-2 LR	Argentina	Cold War / Modern	
81	E-44	Greece	Modern	
81	M936 AGR	Brazil	Modern	61.71
81	M8 mortar	Austria	Modern	42
81.2	Stokes 3 inch Mortar	United Kingdom	World War I	47.17
81.5	ML 3-Inch Mortar	United Kingdom	World War II	50.8
82	Type 53-82 mortar	China	Cold War	
82	Type 67 mortar	China	Cold War	
82	Type 84 (W84) mortar	China	Cold War	
82	Type 87 mortar	China	Cold War	
82	HM 15A	Iran		50.5
82	2B14 Podnos	Soviet Union	Cold War	39
82	82-PM-36	Soviet Union	World War II	62
82	82-PM-37	Soviet Union	World War II	56
82	82-PM-41	Soviet Union	World War II	56
82	82-PM-43	Soviet Union	World War II	
82	vzor 52 (mortar mk. 1952)	Czechoslovakia	Cold War	
88.9	Aasen mortar	Russian Empire	World War I	25
90	Type 94 90 mm Infantry Mortar	Japan	World War II	159
90	Type 97 90 mm Infantry Mortar	Japan	World War II	106
98	M-98 mortar	Poland	Modern	
98	vzor 97 (mortar mk. 1997)	Slovakia	Modern	183.5
100	Type 71 mortar	China	Cold War	
100	Type 89-100 (PP-89-100) mortar	China	Cold War	
102	Stokes 4 inch Mortar	United Kingdom	World War I	
105	10.5 cm Luftminenwerfer M 15	German Empire	World War I	126
105	10 cm Nebelwerfer 35	Nazi Germany	World War II	105
107	M2	United States	World War II	151
107	M30	United States	Cold War	305
107	ML 4.2-inch mortar	United Kingdom	World War II	
107	107mm M1938 mortar	Soviet Union	World War II	170
120	Type 53-120 mortar	China	Cold War	
120	Type 55 mortar	China	Cold War	
120	Type 64 mortar	China	Cold War	
120	Type 86 (W86) mortar	China	Cold War	
120	Type 172 (PBP-172) mortar	China	Modern	
120	Mrt P 120 M2 R	Brazil	Modern	150
120	M132A1 mortar	Thailand	Modern	
120	HM 16	Iran		138.5
120	BA-97 (MA-6 MK-II) mortar	Myanmar	Cold War/Modern	
120	MA-6 extended range mortar	Myanmar	Modern	
120	Liliya mountain mortar (Also known as Nona-M)	Soviet Union		
120	120 Krh/40	Finland	World War II	261 (in firing position); 390 (towing)
120	120 KRH 65 Y	Finland	Cold War	436
120	120 KRH 85	Finland	Cold War	280 (in firing position); 480 (towing)
120	120 KRH 92	Finland	Modern	159 (in firing position); 342 (towing)
120	120 mm E1	India		
120	E56	Greece	Modern	
120	2S12 Sani	Russia	Modern	190.5
120	2B23	Russia	Modern	420
120	Mortier Brandt de 120 mm modèle 1935	France	World War II	
120	Mortier 120mm Rayé Tracté Modèle F1	France	Modern	582
120	HY-12	Turkey	Modern	620
120	12 cm GrW 42	Nazi Germany	World War II	280
120	M74/M75 mortar	Yugoslavia	Cold War	
120	M120	Israel	Modern	144.7
120	Razm Mortar	Iran	Modern	
120	Soltam K6	Israel	Modern	144.7
120	120-PM-38	Soviet Union	World War II	280
120	120-PM-43	Soviet Union	World War II	275
120	UB M52	Yugoslavia	Cold War	378
120	vzor 82 PRAM L (mortar mk. 1982)	Czechoslovakia	Cold War	
120	M12 mortar	Austria	Modern	145
140	14 cm Minenwerfer M 15	Austria-Hungary	World War I	220
150	Type 93 150 mm infantry mortar	Japan	World War II	
150	Type 96 150 mm Infantry Mortar	Japan	World War II	722
150	Type 97 150 mm Infantry Mortar (long barrel)	Japan	World War II	342
150	Type 97 150 mm Infantry Mortar (short barrel)	Japan	World War II	232.5
155	T25 155mm mortar	United States	World War II	265.352

== See also ==
- List of heavy mortars
- List of mortar carriers
- List of siege artillery — which includes "super heavy" or siege mortars
