= Granatnik wz. 36 =

Granatnik wz.36
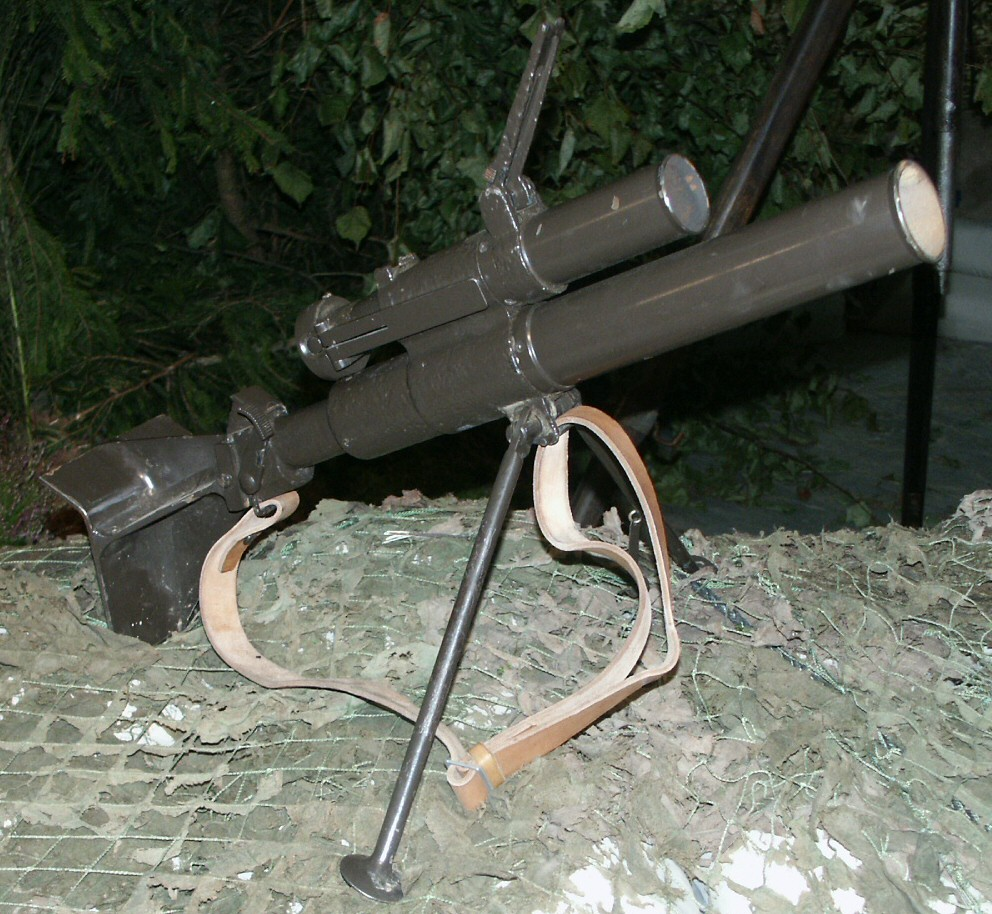
- Type: Grenade launcher
- Place of origin: Poland

Service history
- In service: 1936–1939
- Used by: Polish Army
- Wars: World War II

Production history
- Produced: 1932, 1937–1938
- No. built: 3,850

Specifications
- Mass: 8 kg (18 lb)
- Length: 65 cm (2 ft 2 in)
- Barrel length: 39 cm (1 ft 3 in)
- Shell weight: .76 kg (1 lb 11 oz)
- Caliber: 46 mm (1.81 in)
- Rate of fire: 15 rpm
- Muzzle velocity: 30 – 110 m/s (98 – 360 ft/s)
- Effective firing range: 100–800 m (110–870 yds)

The Granatnik wz.36 was a Polish grenade launcher designed in originally in 1927 as "wz. 30" and later modified in 1936. It entered service in 1936 becoming the standard grenade launcher of the Polish Army; it was still in use during the German Invasion of Poland in 1939.

The wz.30 had a maximum range of 700 meters; this was increased to 800 meters in the wz.36. They both fired the same 46 mm shell, weighing 0.76 kg. About 3,850 of these 46 mm mortars were produced by 1939. Typically 81 such mortars were distributed to each Polish infantry division—three per company.

== Development history ==
In the aftermath of World War I and the Polish-Soviet War of 1920 the Polish Army used a variety of World War I rifle grenade launchers and light mortars, notably the German World War I-vintage light mortar pressed into Polish service under the designation of Granatnik wz. 16 and the French VB rifle grenade designed for the ageing Lebel Rifle. While battle-tested, these weapons were neither accurate nor did they offer enough fire support on a modern battlefield.

To counter that in 1927 the Central Rifle School of Toruń developed a new blunderbuss, or more properly a rifle grenade launcher to be used with the then-standard Kb wz. 98a rifle. This design however proved little better than the already used weapons and in 1929 all further trials were halted.

Work on a new weapon was resumed by the Institute of Material Research for Armament (Polish: Instytut Badań Materiałowych Uzbrojenia) by a team led by Lt. Col. Kick. It was decided to abandon the idea of a rifle grenade altogether and instead design a crossover between a light mortar and a grenade launcher. In April 1931 a prototype of a new mortar was completed. After a series of successful tests, the weapon was accepted by the Polish Army under the designation of granatnik wz. 30 ("grenade launcher Mark 1930"). An order for 400 pieces was placed in the Perkun company in Warsaw. By July 1932 the first mortars entered service.

Meanwhile, the Instytut Techniczny Uzbrojenia (Armament Technical Institute) continued to improve the design and eventually came up with four different projects, initially code-named "type A", B, C and D. (some sources call them "granatnik wz. 30", "wz. 33", "wz. 35" and "wz. 36", respectively). The Centre for Ballistic Studies at Zielonka conducted extensive tests of the four new prototypes hand-made by the Warsaw-based Państwowa Fabryka Karabinów. Eventually the "type D" was chosen and was accepted by the Polish Army as granatnik wz. 36. The first batch was ordered at the I. Zieleniewski factory in Kraków, at a price of 1032 złoty apiece.

The first batch of 850 was delivered to the armed forces by the end of July 1937. Another batch of 1,500 followed the next year. Overall, some 3850 were delivered to the army (397 of wz. 30 and 3453 of wz. 36 type), which allowed the creation of either a separate light mortar section of three mortars in every infantry company, or arming every infantry platoon with at least one grenade launcher.

Full documentation of the wz. 36 mortar and the 46 mm grenades was given free of charge to Yugoslavia in late 1930s, but no licence production followed.

== Operation ==
Unlike ordinary mortars of the era, the firing angle was fixed at 45 degrees and the range was regulated not by raising or lowering the barrel but by limiting the volume of a gas chamber (see also the Type 89 grenade discharger). The unrifled 46 mm barrel was attached to a flat base equipped with a bubble level and stabilised by a folding bipod. On top of the barrel was an exhaust pipe, equipped with a valve and attached to the bottom of the barrel. By turning the valve, soldiers operating the mortar could limit the size of combustion chamber beneath the grenade, setting the muzzle velocity and thus the firing range at between 100 and 800 metres (700 for the wz. 30 version). The mortar was equipped with a frame sight and a muzzle sight, as well as a firing trigger located at the base of the barrel.

In comparison to other light mortars of the period such as the German 5 cm Granatwerfer 36 or the Soviet RM-38, the Polish mortar was less accurate and the grenades used had a smaller warhead, however it was lighter and easier to handle and assemble. Also, thanks to the firing mechanism the weapon could be preloaded and fired immediately upon sighting a target.

Pre-war tests proved the weapon reliable and durable. During one stress test the weapon was fired 850 times at a high rate of fire without requiring cleaning or cooling. However, due to the complexity of the design, field repairs were significantly more difficult than with conventional mortars.
