= Cellerier Mortar =

Mortier de tranchee de circonstance Cellerier
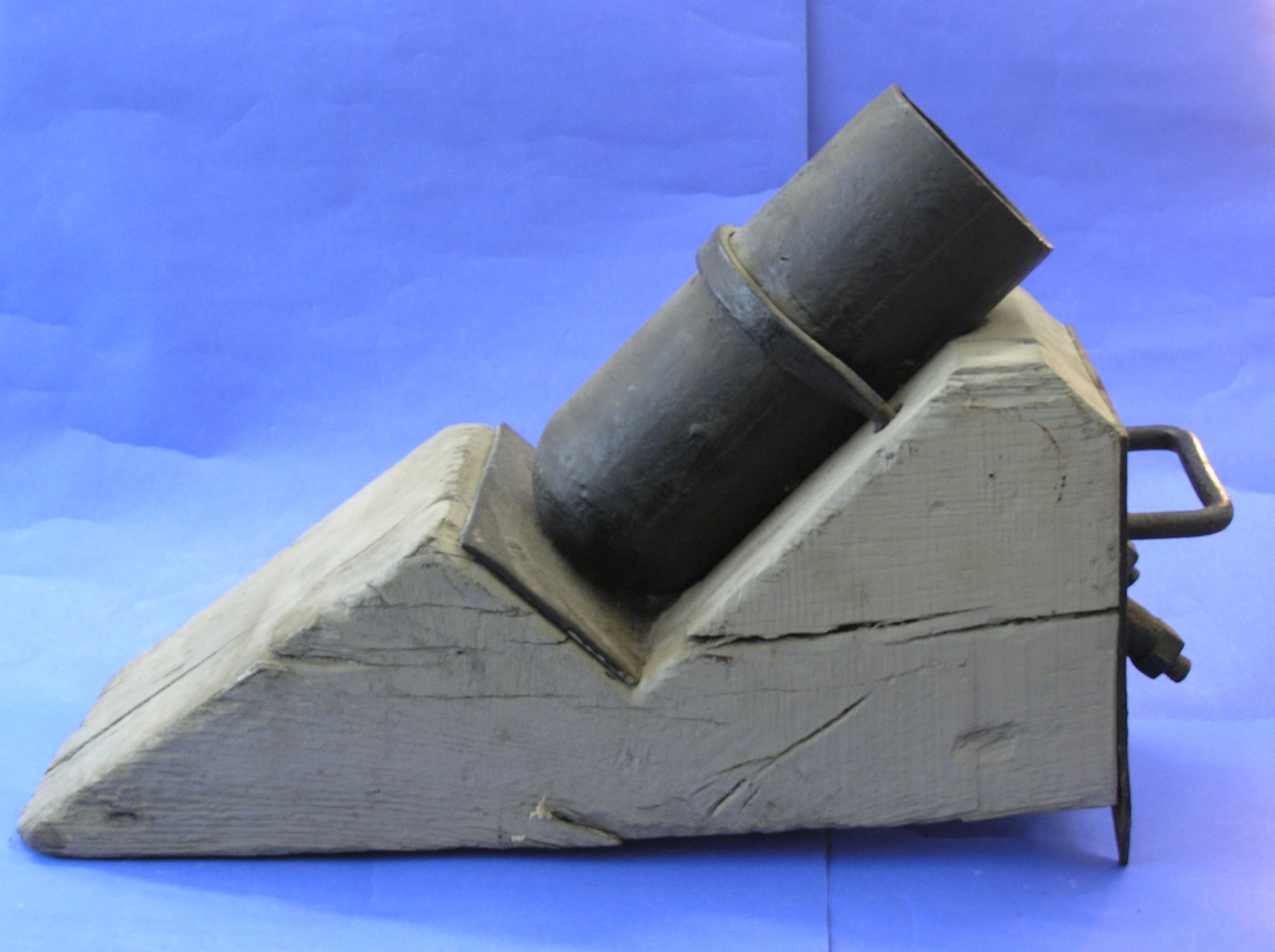
- A Cellerier mortar at the Auckland Museum
- Type: Infantry mortar
- Place of origin: France

Service history
- In service: 1914-1918
- Used by: France
- Wars: World War I

Production history
- Designer: Captain Cellerier

Specifications
- Mass: 12 kg (26 lb)
- Shell: 1.8 kg (3 lb 15 oz)
- Caliber: 65 mm (2.6 in)
- Elevation: +45°
- Effective firing range: 250–300 m (270–330 yd)

The Mortier de tranchee de circonstance Cellerier or Cellerier Mortar was an early French light infantry mortar of World War I. The name roughly translates to (Cellerier Improvised Trench Mortar) in English.

== Background ==
The majority of military planners before the First World War were wedded to the concept of fighting an offensive war of rapid maneuver which before mechanization meant a focus on cavalry and light horse artillery firing shrapnel shells at formations of troops in the open. The problem facing the combatants was that their light field guns were designed for direct fire and only had limited angles of elevation and weren't capable of providing the high-angle indirect fire needed to deal with enemy troops in dug-in positions.

The problem for the French Army was they lacked light, portable, simple, and inexpensive firepower that could be brought with them to provide high-angle indirect fire against an entrenched enemy. Unlike the Germans the French lacked portable mortars like the Granatenwerfer 16, 7.58 cm Minenwerfer or 17 cm mittlerer Minenwerfer for the first half of the war. Early in the war, the French scoured their arms depots and museums and the closest equivalent they had to Germany's light mortars were bronze Mortier de 15 cm mle 1838s. They experimented with crossbows, catapults, and slingshots to propel hand grenades with limited success.

== History ==
Faced with heavy and effective German mortar fire in the Argonne sector French Artillery Captain Cellerier developed an improvised light trench mortar in November 1914 that utilized cheap and available materials. The base of the mortar was made from a wooden beam with a +45° notch cut out of it and the smoothbore barrel was made from discarded shell casings from the German 7.7 cm FK 96 n.A. field gun. The shell casing was modified by drilling a hole in the base for a pyrotechnic time fuze and the barrel was fastened to the base with a metal bracket which extended through the base and was bolted to the front. Photos of surviving mortars look like an iron pipe could also be used for the barrel instead of shell casings. An iron plate with a handle was attached to the front of the base to carry the mortar and two small spikes at the bottom of the plate anchored the base.

To load the mortar a fuze was placed in the base of the barrel and then a propellant charge was inserted in the muzzle. Then a 65 mm projectile from the Canon de 65 M mle 1906 mountain gun modified with a tail-cone with four sheet metal fins that was placed in the muzzle and the fuze was lit which ignited the propellant charge. The range could be set by varying the size of the propellant charge and by placing shims beneath the base to change the angle of fire. Often groups of mortars were fired together to provide a preparatory barrage before crossing no man's land. These barrages helped mitigate the small size and inaccuracy of the projectiles.

The ignition source would often be a lit cigarette. They were sometime called Taupia mortars, after taupe, the French term for the animal, the mole.

== Gallery ==
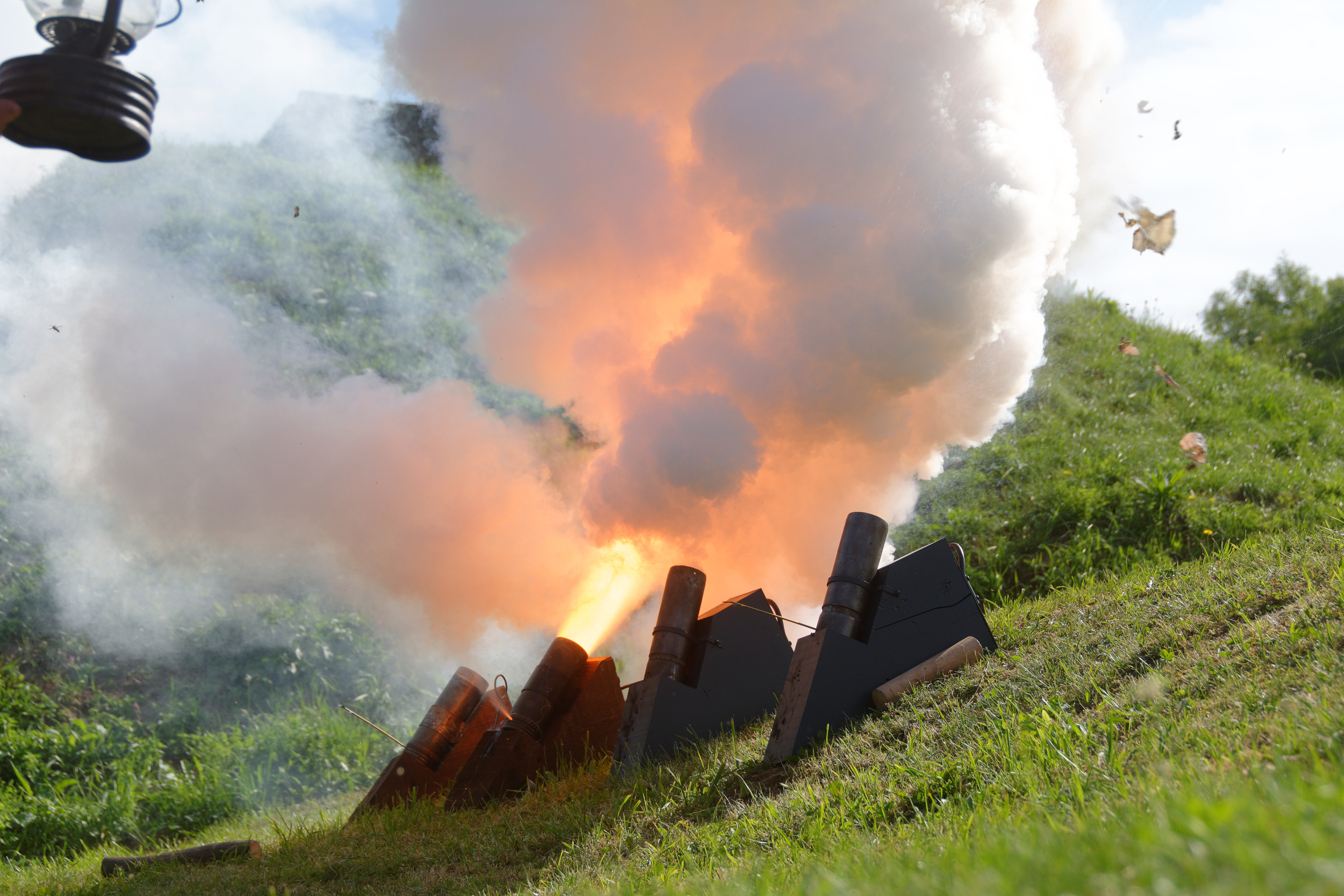
Replica Cellerier mortars being fired during a re-enactment in Belfort, France

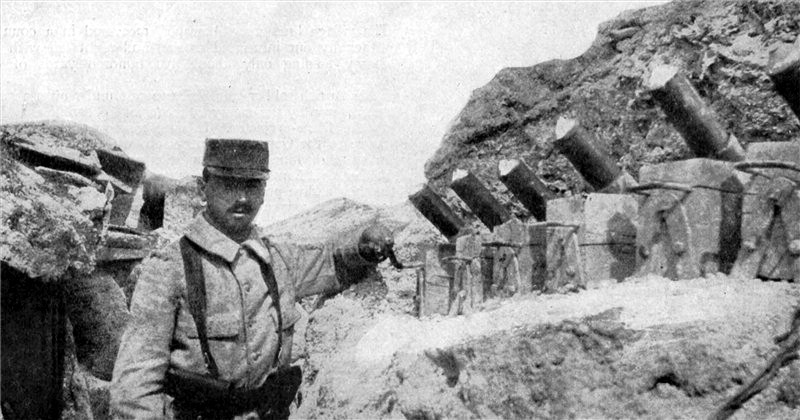
A battery of Cellerier mortars

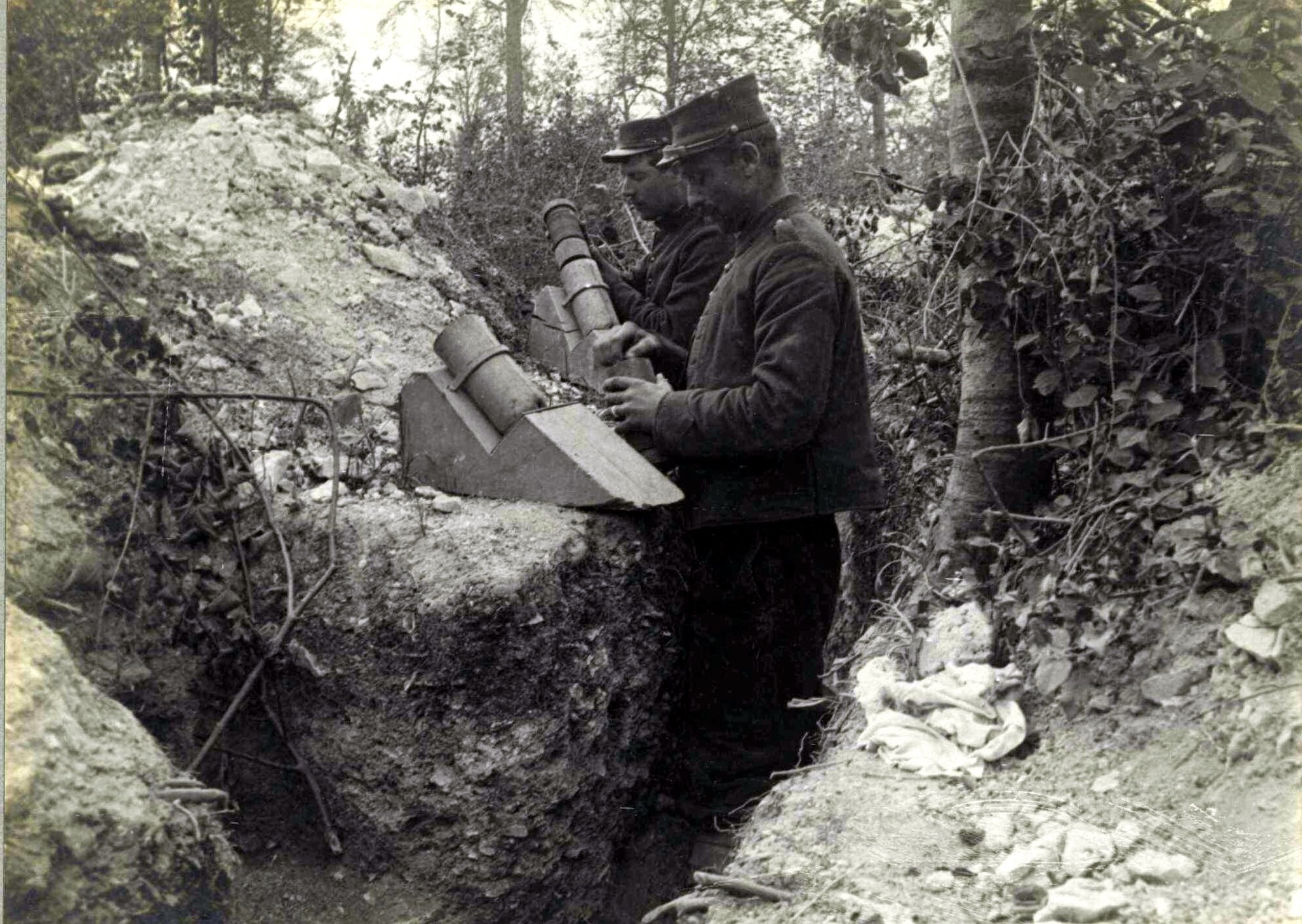
Loading a pair of Cellerier mortars

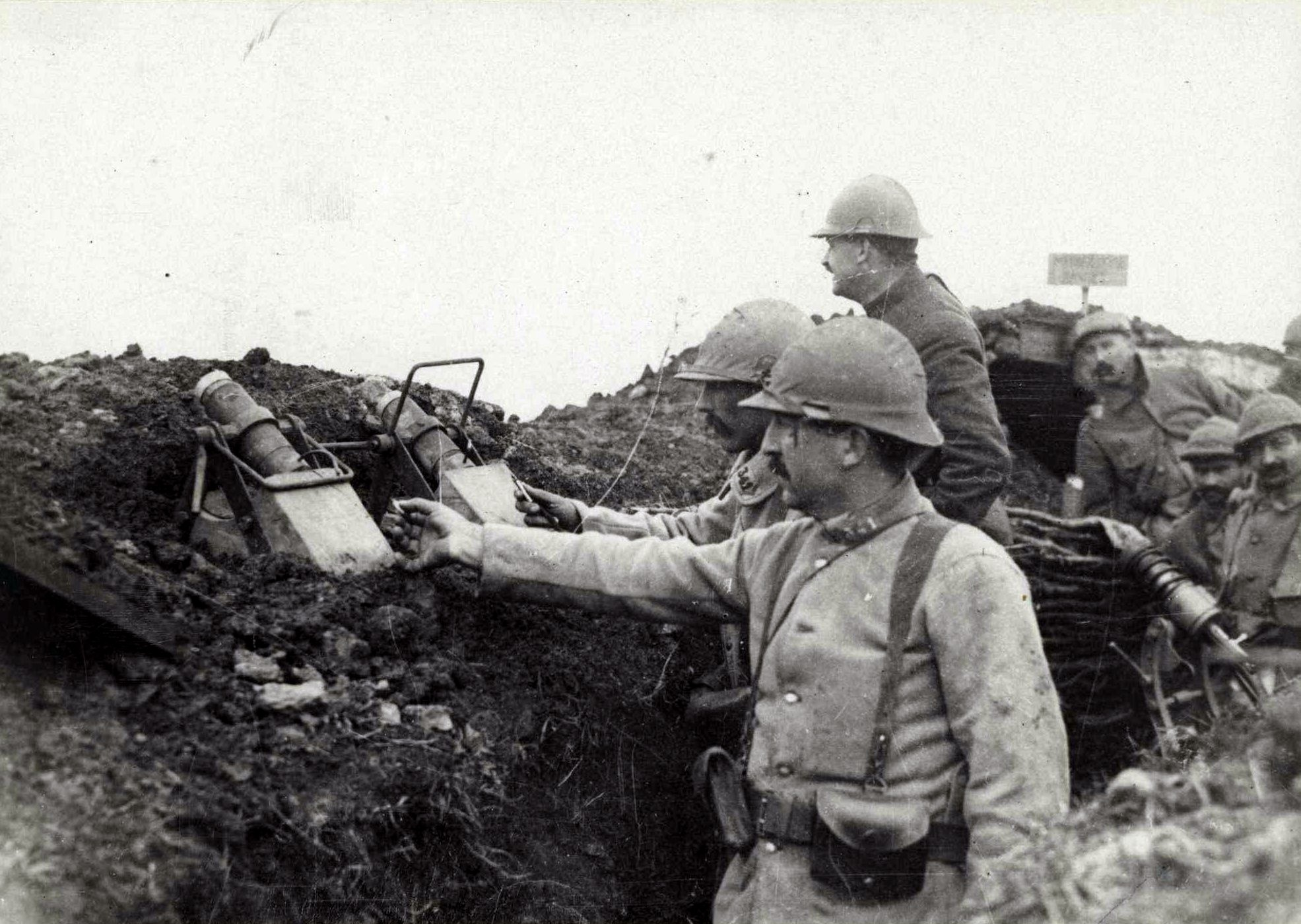
A Cellerier mortar variant with a trunnioned barrel and adjustable elevation

A mortar being fired by a lit cigarette

A 1916 depiction of a battery in action
