= 12 cm Luftminenwerfer M 16 =

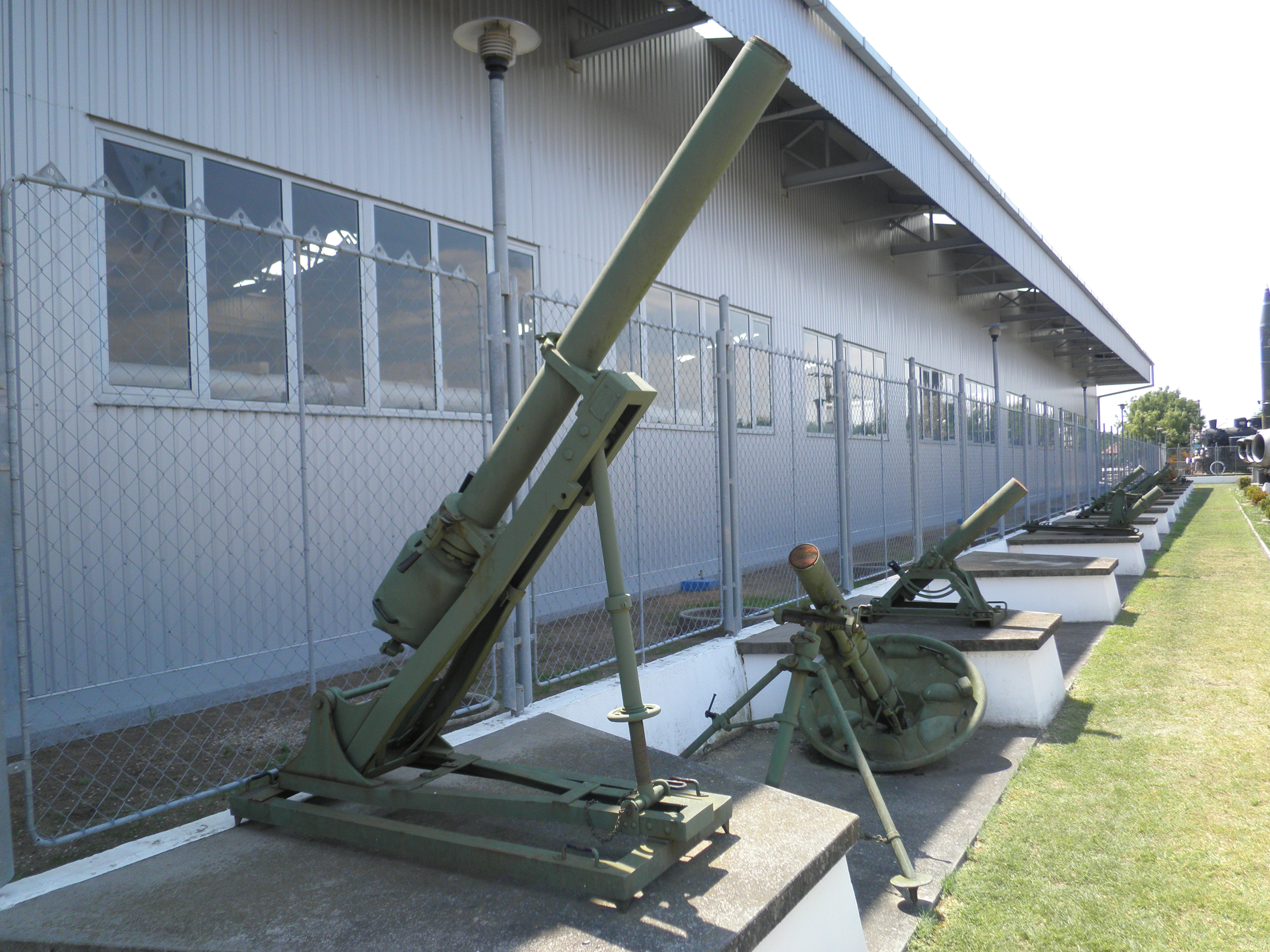
- 12 cm Luftminenwerfer M. 16 in Army History Museum and Park in Kecel, Hungary
- Type: Medium trench mortar
- Place of origin: Austria-Hungary

Service history
- In service: 1915–1918
- Used by: Austria-Hungary
- Wars: World War I

Production history
- Designer: Austria Metal Works
- Designed: 1914–1915
- Produced: 1915–1918
- No. built: 930+
- Variants: M 16a

Specifications
- Mass: 240 kilograms (530 lb)
- Crew: 3
- Shell: 5 kilograms (11 lb)
- Caliber: 120 millimetres (4.7 in)
- Traverse: 0°
- Maximum firing range: 800 metres (870 yd)

The 12 cm Luftminenwerfer M 16 (Pneumatic trench mortar) was a medium mortar used by Austria-Hungary in World War I. It was developed by Austria Metal Works in Brno from their earlier, rejected, 8 cm project. It was a rigid-recoil, smooth-bore, breech-loading design that had to be levered around to aim at new targets. It was very simple in that the shell closed the top of the chamber and was retained by a "gripper" until the air pressure was deemed sufficient and the gripper was manually released, which fired the weapon. An additional barrel could be fitted to extend the range. A cylinder of compressed air was good for eleven shots.

After an evaluation on 23 November 1915 it was deemed superior to the German designs already in service (10.5 cm Luftminenwerfer M 15 and 15 cm Luftminenwerfer M 15 M. E.) in range and accuracy and a batch of 100 mortars and 50,000 bombs was ordered at the beginning of 1916. Some 280 were at the front by the end of 1916 and 930 by the end of 1917. In addition to Austria Metal Works it was produced by Brand & L'Huillier and the machine factory at Brno-Köningsfeld. Some improvements must have been made over the course of the production run because late-war documents refer to the original design as the M 16a (alte?), but what exactly was changed is unknown.

== Bibliography ==
- Ortner, M. Christian. The Austro-Hungarian Artillery From 1867 to 1918: Technology, Organization, and Tactics. Vienna, Verlag Militaria, 2007 ISBN 978-3-902526-13-7
