= 8 cm Luftminenwerfer M 15 =

- Type: Light trench mortar
- Place of origin: Austria-Hungary

Service history
- Used by: Austria-Hungary
- Wars: World War I

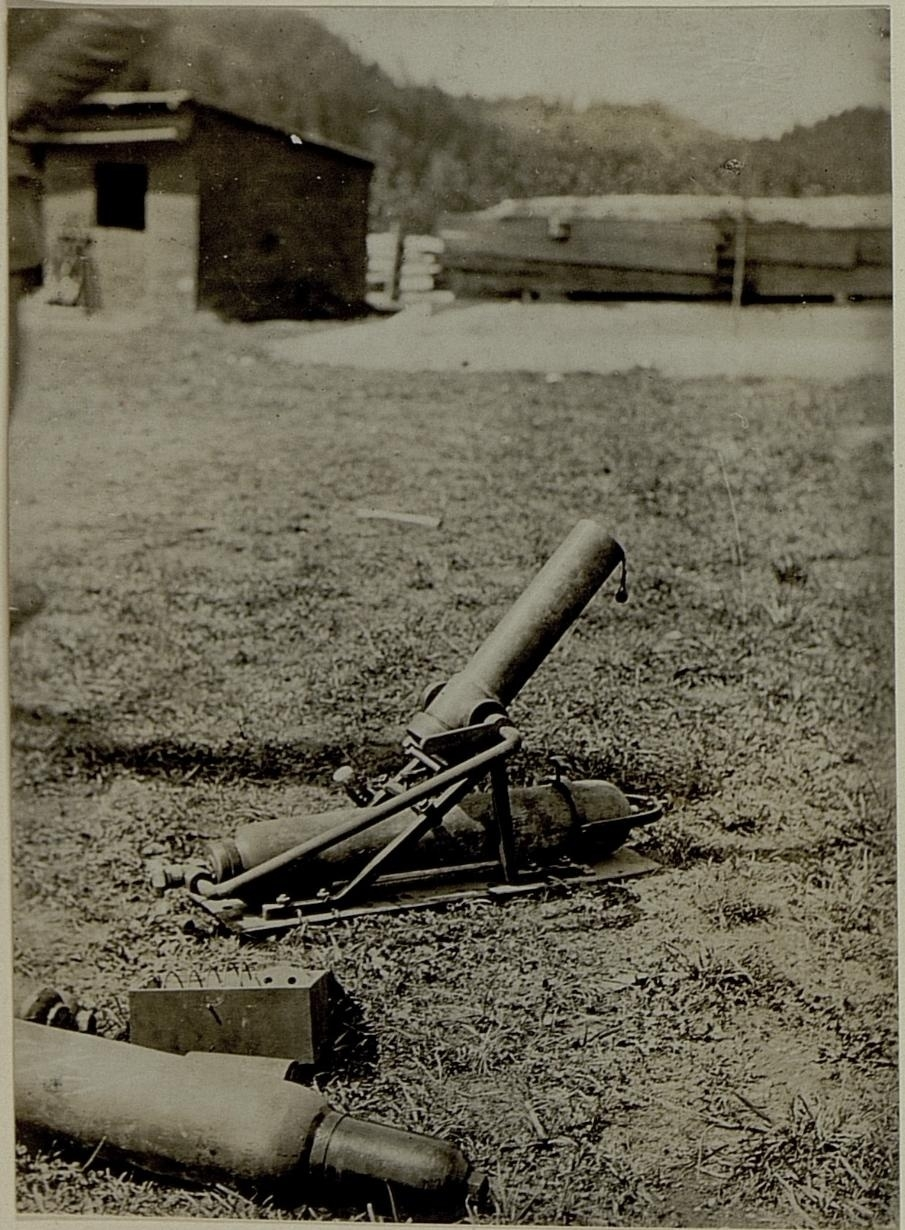
The mortar in firing position

The 8 cm Luftminenwerfer M 15 (Pneumatic trench mortars) was a light mortar used by Austria-Hungary in World War I. Troops fighting on the Italian Front wanted a mortar that did not make as much noise or produce as much smoke as the 9 cm Minenwerfer M 14, so the 58th Infantry Division created this weapon in 1915 in unit workshops with later production moved to Vereinigte Elektrische Maschinen AG in Budapest. These simple mortars used the breakable screw method to retain the bomb in place until the air pressure (approximately 270 standard atmospheres (4,000 psi) in the chamber was strong enough to break the screw. Grooves of different depths could be used to vary the range. Approximately 16 1.5kg rounds could be fired from a single compressed air tank. With the entire assembly weighing only 30kg (20kg without compressed air bottles), the entire mortar could be carried in a sack for easy transport. In addition to the 8 cm mortar, a 15 cm mortar was created, the 15 cm Luftminenwerfer M. 16. Though created at the same time as the 8 cm in 1915, it was given the designation M.16 to avoid confusion with the 15 cm Luftminenwerfer M 15 M. E. Both mortars are often appendixed with Roka-Halasz (8cm luft Minenwerfer M15 Roka-Halasz, 15 cm Luftminenwerfer M. 16 System Roka-Halasz).

== Bibliography ==
- Ortner, M. Christian (2007). The Austro-Hungarian Artillery From 1867 to 1918: Technology, Organization, and Tactics. Vienna: Verlag Militaria. ISBN 978-3-902526-13-7.

== External images ==
- http://www.moesslang.net/minenwerfer8cm.htm
- https://jenikirbyhistory.getarchive.net/amp/topics/8+cm+luftminenwerfer+m+15
