= Wilfred Stokes =

Sir Wilfrid Stokes KBE
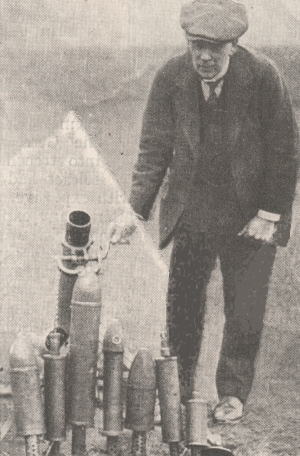
- Stokes with one of his Mortars (1916-1918)
- Born: 9 April 1860; Liverpool, England
- Died: 7 February 1927 (aged 66); Ruthin, Wales
- Education: Catholic University College, Kensington
- Occupation: Civil Engineer
- Known for: Inventing the Stokes Mortar
- Spouse: Iren Ionides
- Relatives: Richard Stokes, nephew

Sir Frederick Wilfrid Scott Stokes, KBE (9 April 1860 – 7 February 1927) was the inventor in 1915 of the Stokes Mortar, which saw extensive use in the latter half of the First World War and was one of the first truly portable mortars.

Stokes was born on 9 April 1860 in Liverpool, the son of Scott Nasmyth Stokes, a school inspector. He was educated at St. Francis Xavier's College and the Catholic University College, Kensington.

Following an apprenticeship with the Great Western Railway, he eventually became an assistant to William Shelford working on the designs for bridges for the Hull and Barnsley Railway.

He was involved with the construction of the Aswan Low Dam in Egypt, for which he in 1902 received the 2nd class of the Ottoman Order of Osmanieh from the Khedive of Egypt.

A civil engineer by trade, Stokes was appointed chairman and managing director of Ransomes & Rapier, an engineering company based in Ipswich, which manufactured cranes. Between 1915 and 1918 Stokes worked for the Inventions Branch of the Ministry of Munitions where he invented the Stokes Mortar. The trench mortar was first used in 1915 during the Battle of Loos to fire a smoke shell. At first it was not liked but as the construction was improved it was widely used and eventually produced in two sizes. This mortar continued in use, its effectiveness being improved again and again by other British engineers.

Stokes received a knighthood in 1917 for inventing the mortar which was named for him. He was also given several forms of monetary reward by the Ministry of Munitions for his invention including royalties of £1 per Stokes mortar bomb.

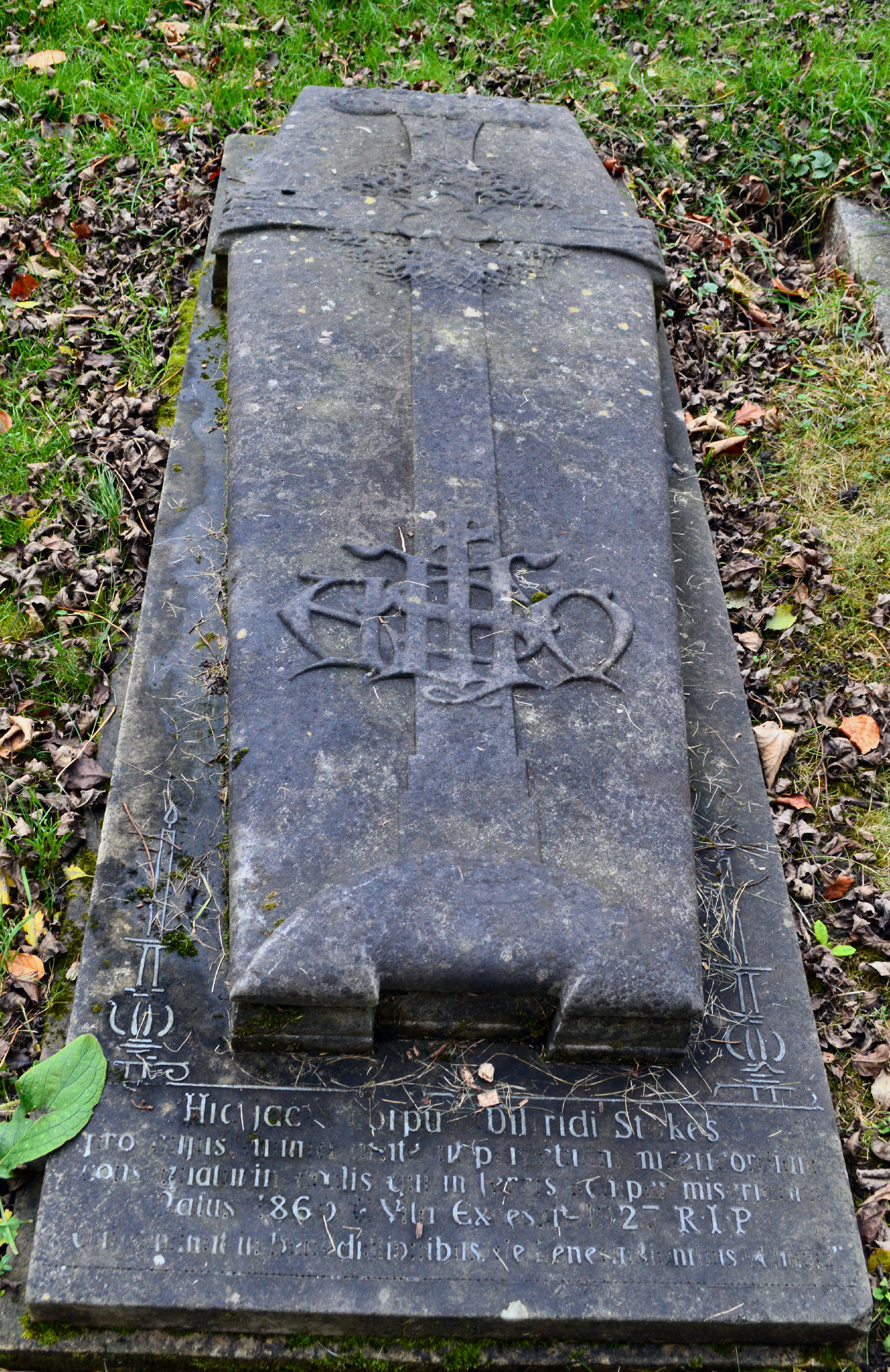
St Mary Magdalen, Mortlake

Stokes married Iren Ionides in 1899. He is buried at St Mary Magdalen Roman Catholic Church, Mortlake.

His brother Leonard Stokes was an architect. His nephew Richard Stokes was a Labour MP and minister.

== See also ==
- Stokes Mortar
