= Granatenwerfer 16 =

Granatwerfer 16
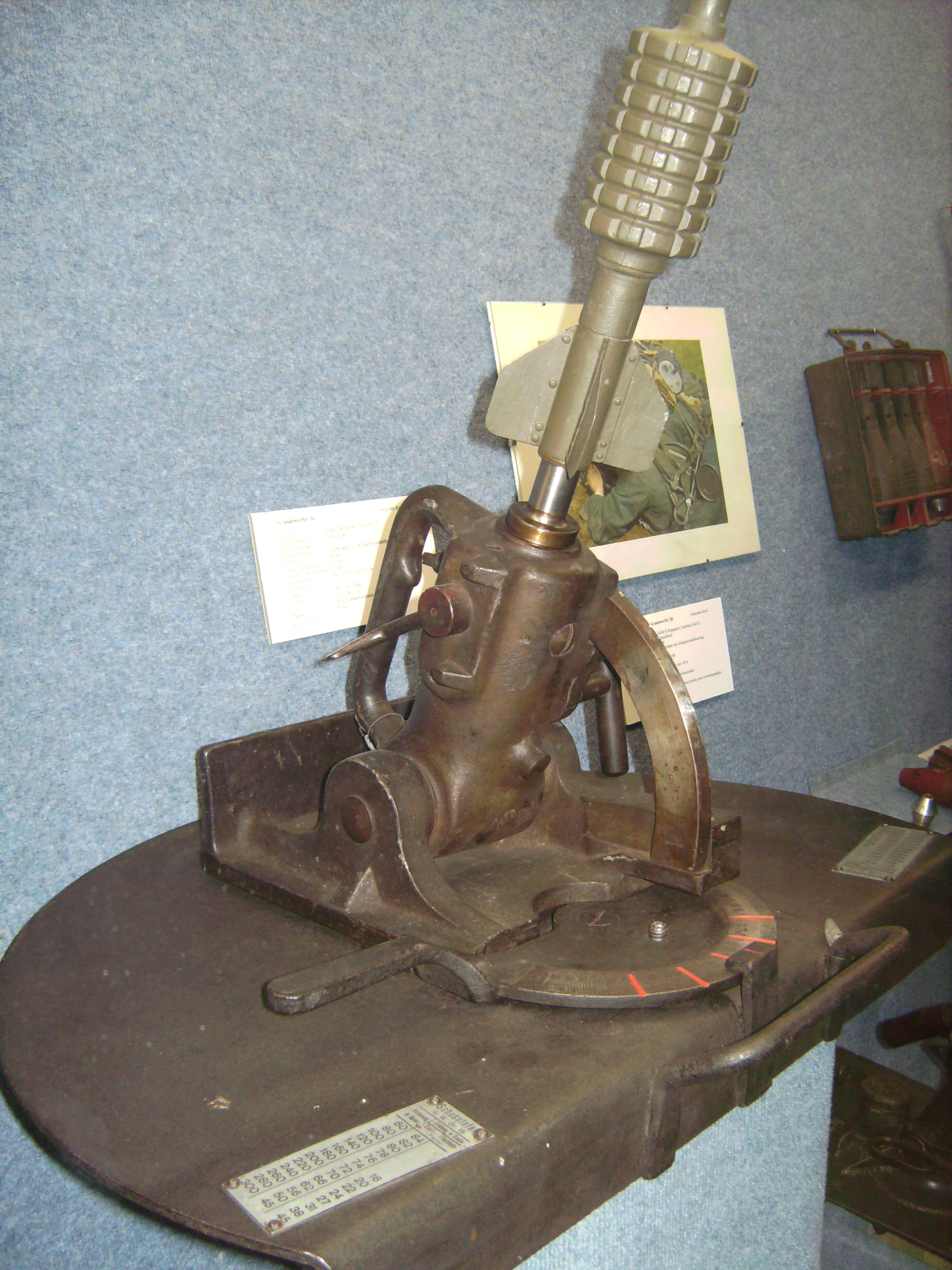
- A Granatwerfer 16 at the Wehrtechnische Studiensammlung, Koblenz, Germany
- Type: Infantry mortar Grenade launcher
- Place of origin: German Empire

Service history
- In service: 1916–1920s
- Used by: German Empire; Austria-Hungary; Kingdom of Bulgaria; Ottoman Empire; Second Polish Republic
- Wars: World War I

Production history
- Designer: Father Vécer
- Manufacturer: Stock & Co, Berlin; Bing Brothers, Nürnberg; Maschinenfabrik Alfred Wolff, Berlin.

Specifications
- Mass: Launcher: 24 kg (53 lb); Baseplate: 16 kg (35 lb)
- Barrel length: 152 mm (6 in)
- Shell: 1.8 kg (3 lb 15 oz)
- Caliber: 60 mm (2.4 in)
- Recoil: None
- Elevation: +14° to +85°
- Traverse: 80° L/R
- Rate of fire: 4-5 rpm
- Effective firing range: 460 m (500 yd)

The kleine Granatenwerfer 16 or Gr.W.16 (Small Grenade Launcher Model 1916) in English, was an infantry mortar used by the Central Powers during the First World War. It was designed by a Hungarian priest named Father Vécer and was first used by the Austro-Hungarian Army in 1915. In Austro-Hungarian service, they received the nickname "Priesterwerfers". In 1916 Germany began producing a modified version under license for the Imperial German Army.

== Background ==
The majority of military planners before the First World War were wedded to the concept of fighting an offensive war of rapid maneuver which before mechanization meant a focus on cavalry and light horse artillery firing shrapnel shells at formations of troops in the open. The problem facing the combatants was that their light field guns were designed for direct fire and only had limited angles of elevation and were not capable of providing the high-angle indirect fire needed to deal with enemy troops in dug-in positions.

The simple expedient was to elevate the guns by having them fire from pits but the size and weight of the guns were excessive and pack animals could not move the guns in the trenches or across the shell-pocked quagmire of no man's land. What the theorists had not foreseen was that land mines, trenches, barbed wire, and machine guns would rob them of mobility and as the Western Front stagnated into trench warfare the light field guns that the combatants went to war with began to show their limitations.

Often defenders would wait out a preparatory artillery bombardment in reinforced dugouts and once the bombardment had lifted they would man their trenches and machine-gun nests in anticipation of an enemy attack across no man's land. Barbed wire was often used to channel attackers away from vulnerable areas of the defender's trenches and funnel attackers into predefined kill zones where overlapping fields of machine-gun fire could be brought to bear or to hold attackers at a safe distance to call in defensive artillery fire. The machine-gun nests could be constructed of sandbags, timber, corrugated metal, and concrete with overhead protection. For infantry advancing across no man's land, all they may see is a small horizontal opening at waist level, with just the top of the gun shield showing. Attacking infantry would have to close on these positions while under fire and destroy them with rifle fire, grenades, and flamethrowers.

The problem for the attacker was they lacked light, portable, simple, and inexpensive firepower that could be brought with them to overcome enemy machine gun nests by low-angle direct fire and partially exposed troops in trenches by high-angle indirect fire. Early on the combatants experimented with crossbows, catapults, and slingshots to propel hand grenades with limited success. Eventually, most combatants settled on hand grenades, rifle grenades, and trench mortars. However, there was still a niche between grenades and trench mortars which the Granatenwerfer 16 filled.

== Design ==
The Granatenwerfer 16 was a type of spigot mortar. Rather than being a muzzle-loaded weapon like a Stokes or Brandt mortar where the projectiles slide down a tube until it hits a firing pin to launch the projectile, the Granatenwerfer had a short metal spigot that was attached to a base that was adjustable for traverse and elevation. The Granatenwerfer 16 had a two-man crew consisting of a gunner and a loader. The projectile was similar in size and construction to a hand grenade with a hollow center tube with tail fins that slid over the spigot. The Granatenwerfer 16 was light enough to be carried across no man's land while other weapons like the 147 kg (324 lb) 7.58 cm Minenwerfer or the 483 kg (1,065 lb) 17 cm mittlerer Minenwerfer were sometimes too heavy to be transported easily across rough ground. The Granatenwerfer 16 could be broken down into two parts with the launcher weighing 24 kg (53 lb) and the baseplate weighing 16 kg (35 lb).

== Production ==
There was an earlier unsuccessful Granatenwerfer 15 that was a copy of the Austro-Hungarian design that went into production in 1915. The grenades were slightly larger in diameter, more round in shape, and had different tail fins than the cylindrical Granatenwerfer 16 grenades. The Granatenwerfer 16 was an inexpensive and easy to produce weapon with few moving parts. Nothing required expensive materials or precise machining which meant it could be produced by companies with simple casting and forging facilities that were accustomed to loose tolerances. Each manufacturer built slightly different weapons with only minor differences but they were still able to fire the same ammunition.

== Ammunition ==
The Granatenwerfer 16 could fire a variety of different types of grenades like smoke, high-explosive, illumination, and even a propaganda grenade that could deliver leaflets. But the most common type was high-explosive fragmentation that weighed 1.8 kg (3 lb 15 oz) with 400 g (14 oz) of explosives to a minimum range of 50 m (55 yd) and maximum range of 460 m (500 yd). Compared to 450–680 g (1–1.5 lb) to a maximum range of 160–183 m (175–200 yd) for a rifle grenade. When used as a direct fire weapon the grenade could fill a 5 m (5.5 yd) and 50 m (55 yd) long area with metal fragments and when used for high-angle indirect fire the grenade could fill a 30 m (33 yd) area with fragments. However, the grenades were more accurate when used for indirect fire. The Granatenwerfer 16 tended to be used for anti-personnel work while the heavier trench mortars firing high-explosive shells were tasked with destroying enemy dugouts and barbed wire.

== Firing procedure ==
To fire, the gunner would adjust the angle of the spigot for the desired range and direction, cock the firing mechanism, then rotate the safety lever to the “safe” position. The loader would then insert a contact fuze into the nose of the grenade, slide the grenade onto the spigot, remove the fuse safety pin, and the gunner would fire it by pulling on a lanyard that detonated a 7.92 mm blank cartridge in the base of the grenade. Because of the recoil, it was recommended that the Granatenwerfer 16 be operated from the left so that the gunner could see the notches on the traverse and elevating mechanisms. A well-drilled crew could fire 4-5 rounds per minute or up to 250-300 rounds per hour.

An advantage of the Granatenwerfer 16 was that it was quiet compared to other weapons. The French nicknamed the grenades "Pigeons" or "Turtledoves" because they made a whirring sound while flying through the air. Often not being heard until they were directly overhead leaving little time to take cover. The lightweight grenades, low velocity, and sensitive crush fuzes also meant that the grenades did not sink too deeply on soft ground, enhancing the effectiveness of their fragments. In 1917 a new bouncing grenade was developed that had a small powder charge in the head, and when the grenade hit, the charge would ignite, propelling the grenade 1 m (3 ft 3 in) into the air and then explode, increasing its blast radius.

The Granatenwerfer 16 was normally placed in either the first or second line of trenches. The most efficient number of Granatenwerfers was four per company section of the front. They were normally dispersed at 18 m (20 yd) intervals so no more than two could be destroyed by a single round of enemy counter-battery fire and because battery commanders had a hard time controlling more than four using voice commands, and hand signals without tipping off the enemy. Granatenwerfers could be used to engage troops that had emerged from their dugouts after preparatory bombardments by heavier weapons. Since the Granatenwerfer 16 had a high rate of fire and good accuracy, enemy trenches could be saturated with fire, forcing the enemy to take cover in their dugouts which allowed attacking infantry to cross no man's land unmolested and arrive at their trenches before the defenders had time to react.

== Allied equivalents ==
The allies lacked a direct equivalent to the Granatenwerfer 16 for most of the war. However, in 1917 the French introduced the Bombarde Garnier which was a barrage mortar with eight spigots. The grenades that the Bombarde Garnier fired were very similar to the Granatenwerfer 16 and they were propelled by a blank cartridge with a firing mechanism taken from the Fusil Gras mle 1874.

== Gallery ==
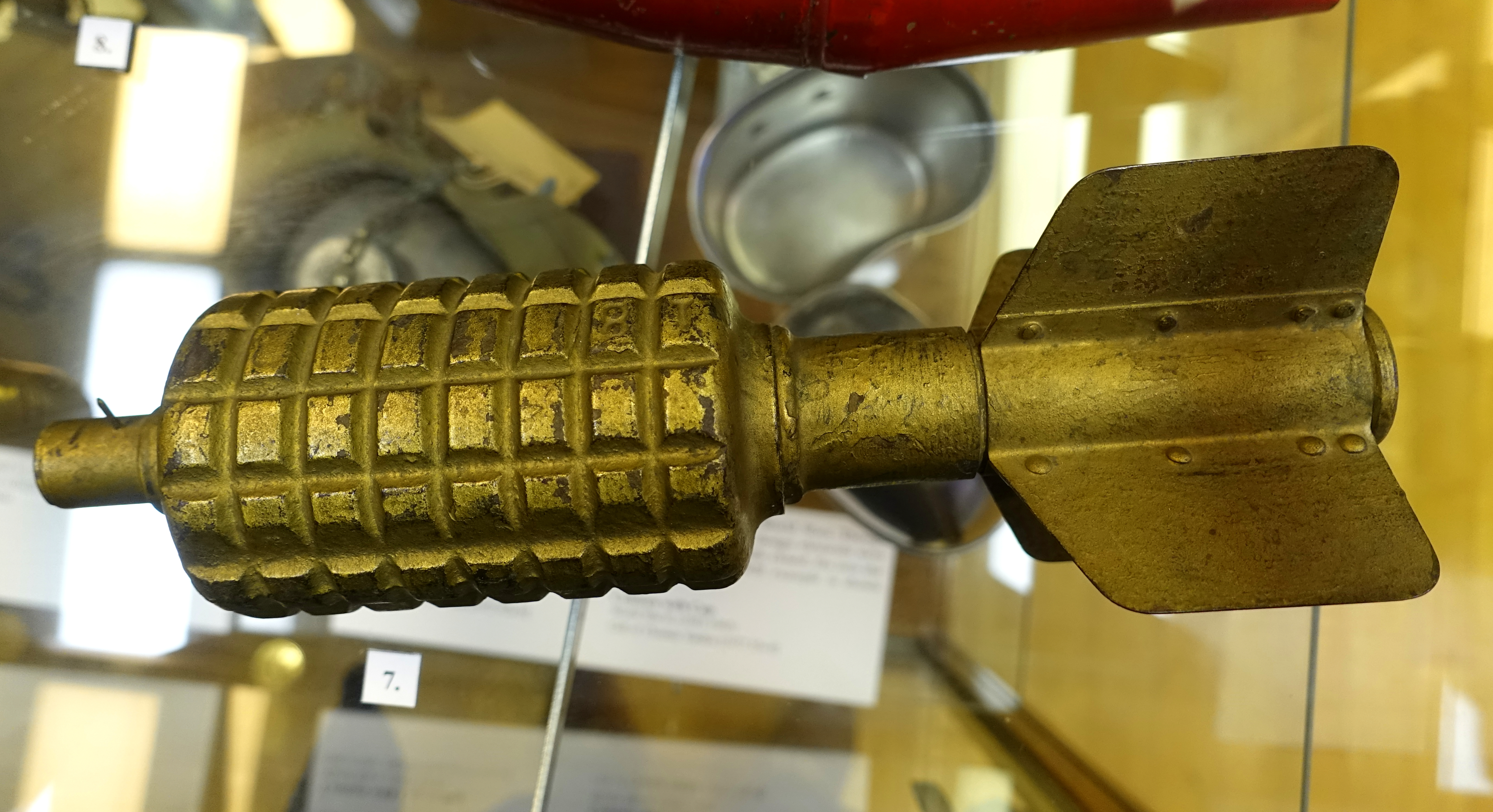
A high-explosive fragmentation grenade.

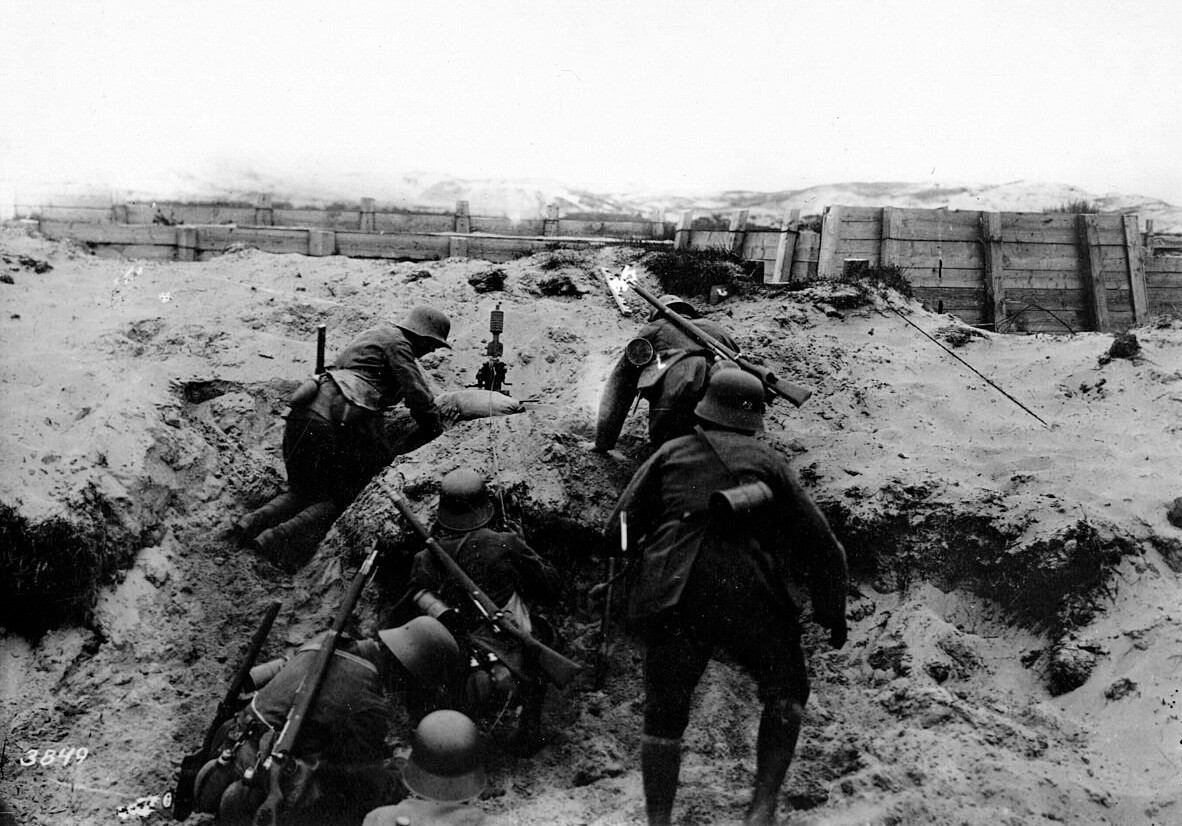
A Granatenwerfer 16 being used by German Seebataillon troops in Flanders, 1917

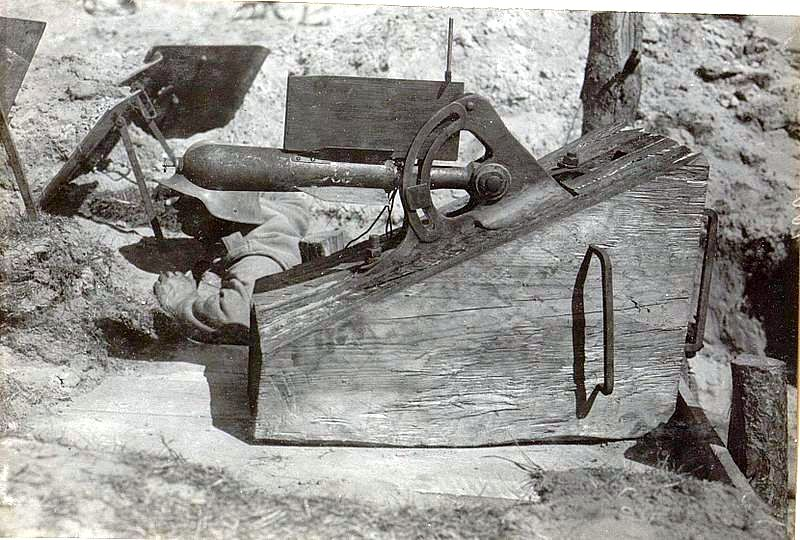
An Austrian Granatenwerfer set up for direct fire

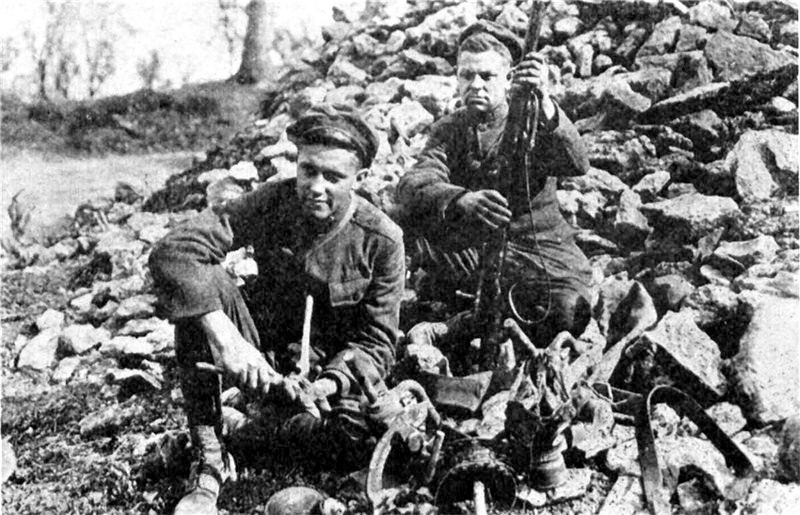
US soldiers with captured German weapons including Granatenwerfer 16s

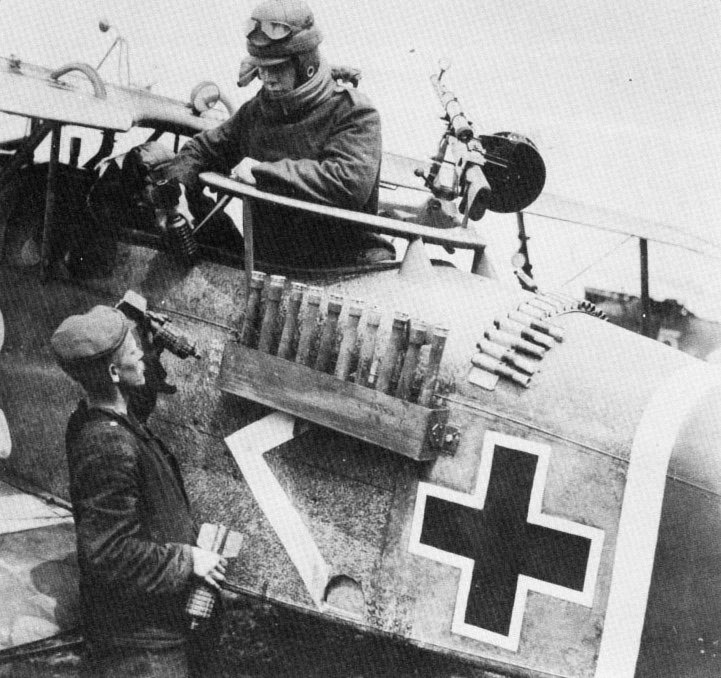
Grenades used as aerial bombs

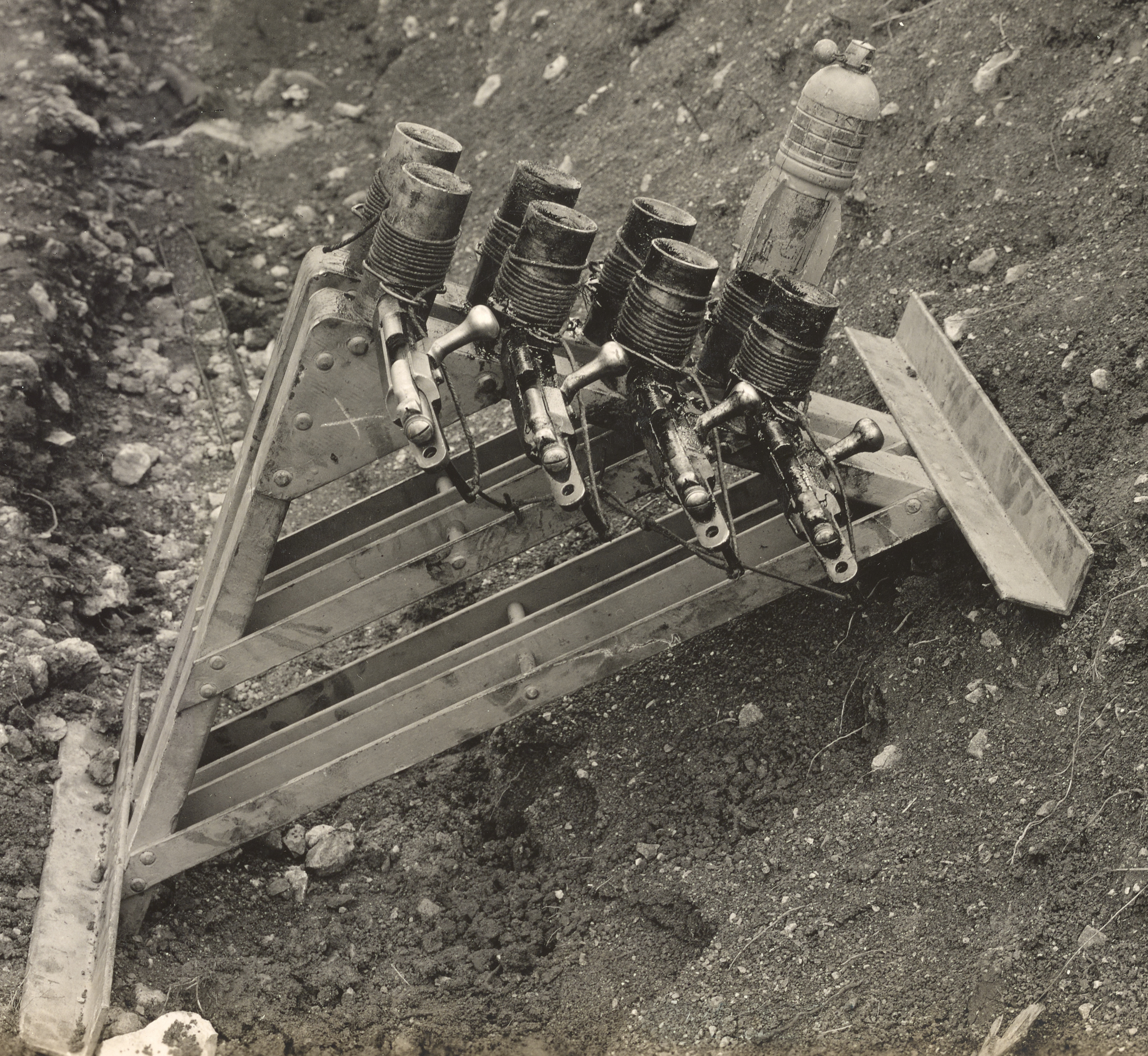
The French Bombarde Garnier barrage mortar
