= RM-38 =

WW2 Soviet infantry mortar

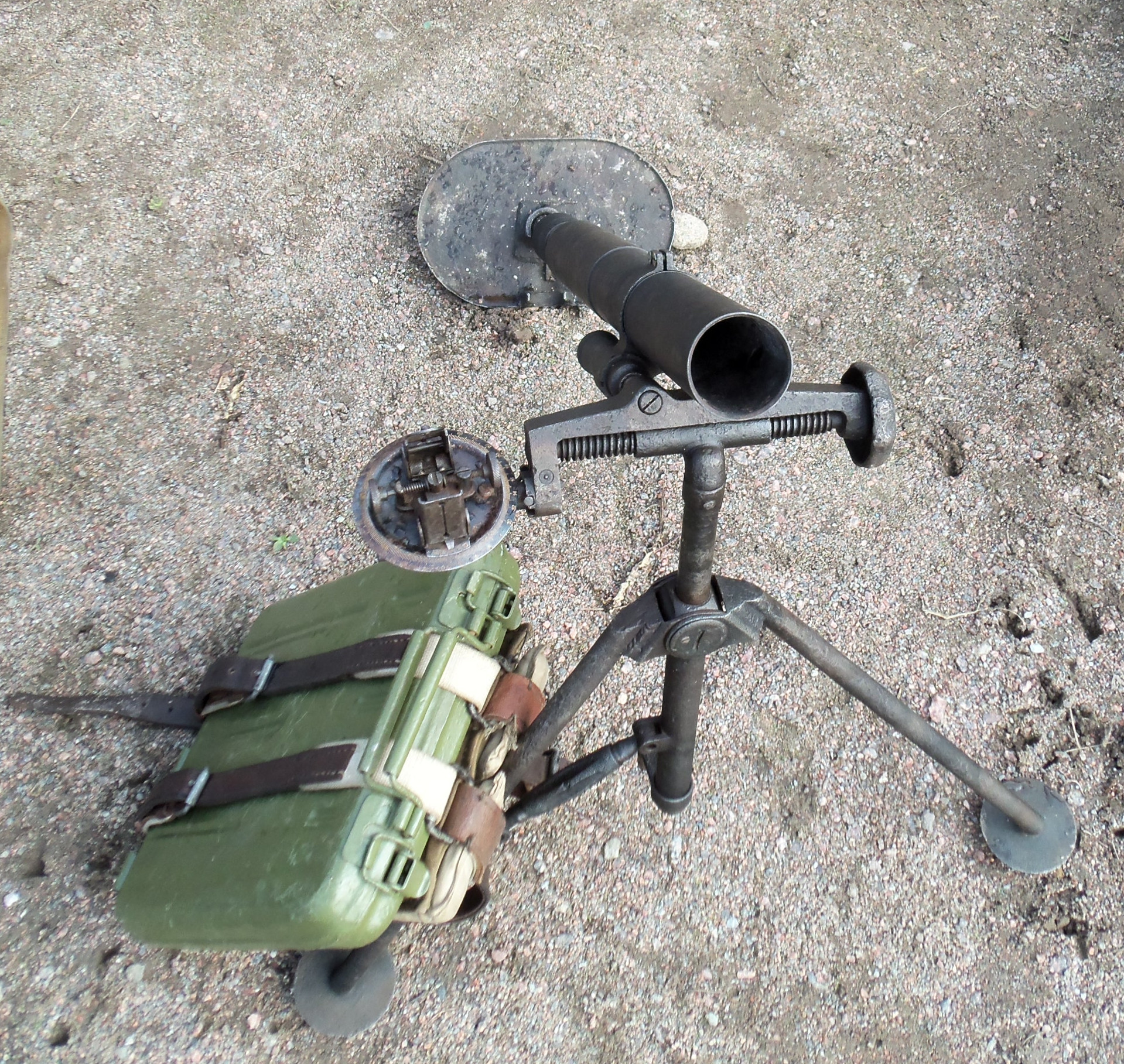
- Company Mortar M1938
- Type: Infantry mortar
- Place of origin: Soviet Union

Service history
- Used by: Soviet Union
- Wars: World War II

Specifications
- Mass: combat: 12.1 kg (27 lb)
- Barrel length: bore: 50 mm (2 in) overall: 78 cm (2 ft 7 in)
- Shell: 0.85 kg (1 lb 14 oz)
- Caliber: 50 mm (1.97 in)
- Breech: muzzle loaded
- Elevation: 45° or 75°. 82° on some models
- Traverse: 6°
- Muzzle velocity: 96 m/s (310 ft/s)
- Maximum firing range: 45°: 800 m (870 yd); 75°: 402 m (440 yd); 82°: 100 m (110 yd)

The RM-38 was a Soviet 50 mm light infantry mortar. The barrel was clamped at two elevation angles only - 45 and 75 degrees. Range variations were made by altering a sleeve round the base of the barrel. This sleeve opened a series of gas ports which bled off exhaust gases and so determined the range.

The project was deemed overly complex and expensive, and was only produced for a short time, before being replaced by the Model 1939. Despite the small number produced, some fell into German hands in 1941, who introduced them as the 5 cm Granatwerfer 205/1(r).

== Development ==
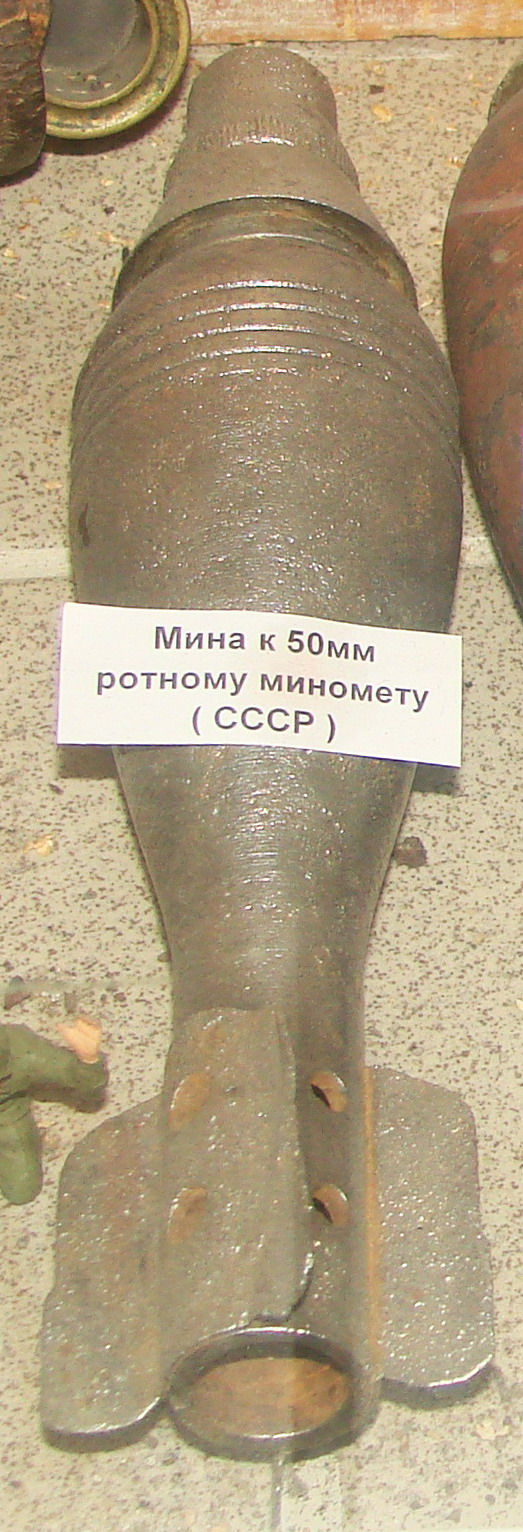
Mine 0-822A for a 50-mm PM-38 mortar.

The RM-38 or 50-RM 38 (50-mm company mortar model 1938) was based on the British Stokes mortar. It was further developed as the RM-39 and RM40.

The Red Army of the USSR divided mortars into company (RM Rotnyy Minomet) battalion (BM Batalonnyy Minomet) and regimental (PM Polkovoy Minomet) mortars. Development of a light 50mm company mortar started in 1937. The RM-38 was approved for use in 1938 and entered production in 1939. In the space of just over a year RM-39, RM-40 and RM-41 replaced each other in succession. RM-41 remained in production until 1943, when the USSR decided to cease making 50mm mortars. Only the RM-41 was a new design with the others being incremental improvements of the original RM-38.

=== Design Improvements ===
The problem of having only two fixed elevations and thus needing to adjust the range with the complex adjustment of gas escape made for inaccurate ranging and was dangerous to the mortar crew as well. The minimum shooting range of 200 m was felt to be impractical in Red Army use as well.

RM-39 added a protective shield which directed the escaping hot gases away from the operator.

Barrels got shorter with each new model.

=== Variants ===
- RM39
  - Barrel Length: 77.5 cm
  - Weight: 14 or 17 kg
- RM40
  - Barrel Length: 63 cm
  - Weight: 12.1 kg

== 50mm RM-41 ==
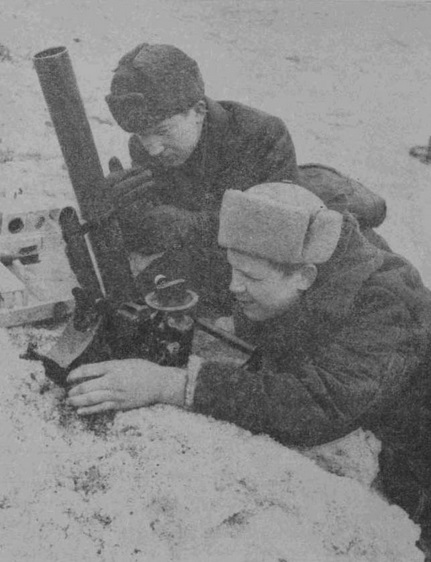

Essentially a new design, influenced by German 50mm mortars, which was continued in use until 50mm mortars were removed from Soviet Army service. This mortar was without a tripod but instead relied on its barrel yoke which contained traverse and elevation adjustments. The gases now vented under the muzzle via a tube.

== Use ==
All models saw widespread use by the USSR in World War II. Captured in large numbers, they were also re-used by the Finns and Germans. After World War II the USSR supplied them to North Korea and Vietnam.

The Finns were apparently not impressed with these Russian 50mm mortars, giving them mildly derogatory nicknames - "Naku" and "Tiltu", and not being over-zealous about re-issuing them.

The Finns found the RM-39 relatively accurate in use and getting the mortar ready to fire took only about one minute. The mortar was no substitute for the 80-82mm mortars however, perhaps due to only having 100g of TNT in the shell, less than some hand grenades.

== See also ==
- List of Russian weaponry
