= 15 cm Luftminenwerfer M 15 M. E. =

15 cm Minenwerfer M 15 M. E.
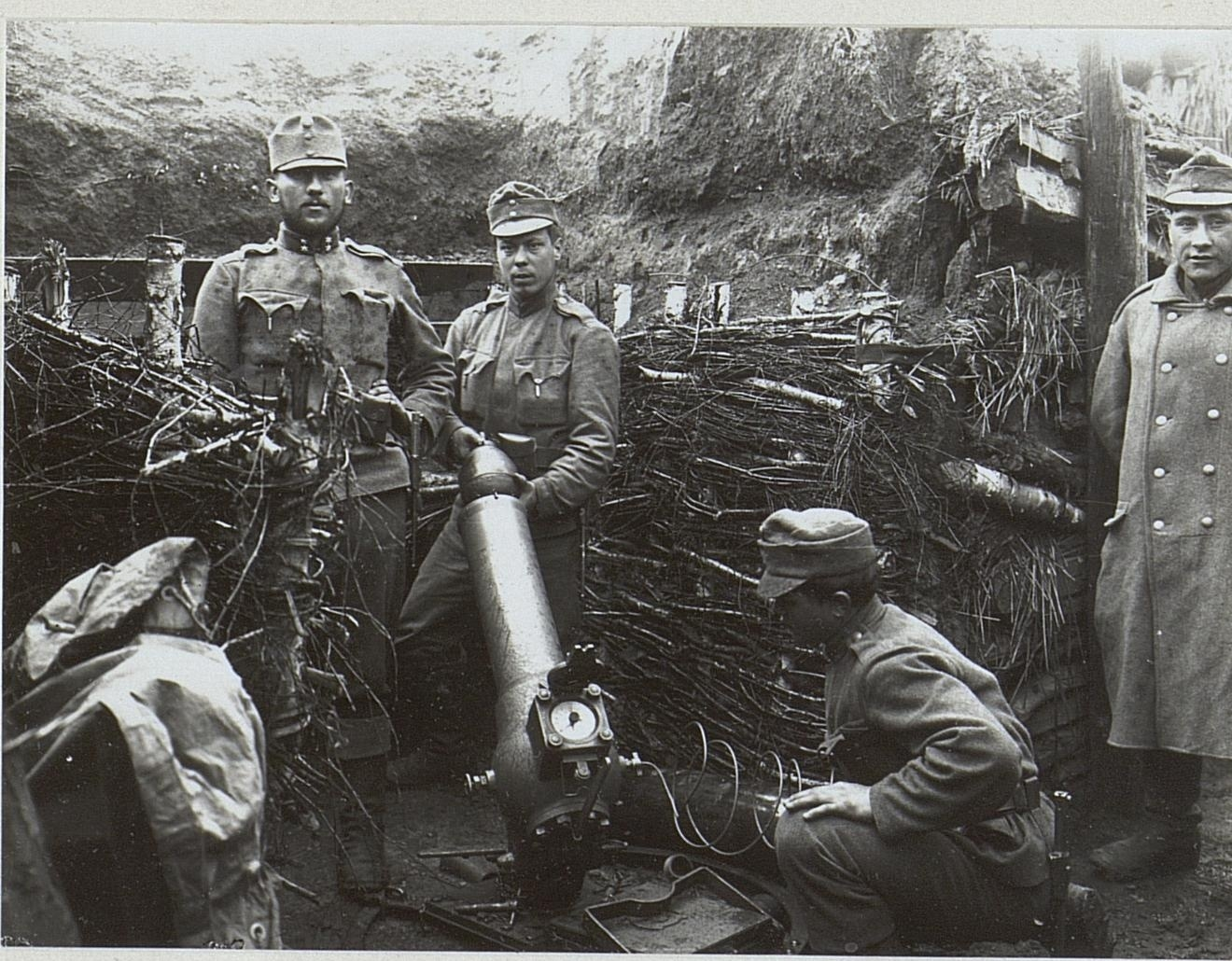
- Type: Medium trench mortar
- Place of origin: German Empire

Service history
- In service: 1915–1918
- Used by: Austria-Hungary
- Wars: World War I

Production history
- Designer: Maschinenfabrik Esslingen
- Designed: 1914–1915
- Manufacturer: Maschinenfabrik Esslingen
- Produced: 1915–1916
- No. built: 200
- Variants: Model II

Specifications
- Mass: 207 kilograms (456 lb)
- Caliber: 150 mm (5.90 in)
- Traverse: 360°?
- Maximum firing range: 500 metres (550 yd)

The 15 cm Luftminenwerfer M 15 M. E. (Pneumatic Trench Mortar Maschinenfabrik Esslingen) was a medium mortar used by Austria-Hungary in World War I. It was developed by the German firm Maschinenfabrik Esslingen in response to a German requirement. Its initial testing was observed by an Austro-Hungarian representative and his positive report convinced them to order a batch of five for comparative testing. It was evaluated on 21 September 1915 and it produced the right impression. Nonetheless four weapons were sent off for combat trials at the end of October 1915, which were presumably favorable.

The barrel was mounted on a central pivot attached to a base plate, apparently with 360° of traverse. A single cylinder of compressed air was good for twelve shots.

The Model II incorporated minor improvements suggested by both the Austrians and German pioneer troops and was evaluated at the end of 1915. It was deemed satisfactory and another hundred were ordered. However, they were soon made obsolete by the better performance of the 12 cm Luftminenwerfer M 16 and shelved before the production run was finished.
