= 10.5 cm Luftminenwerfer M 15 =

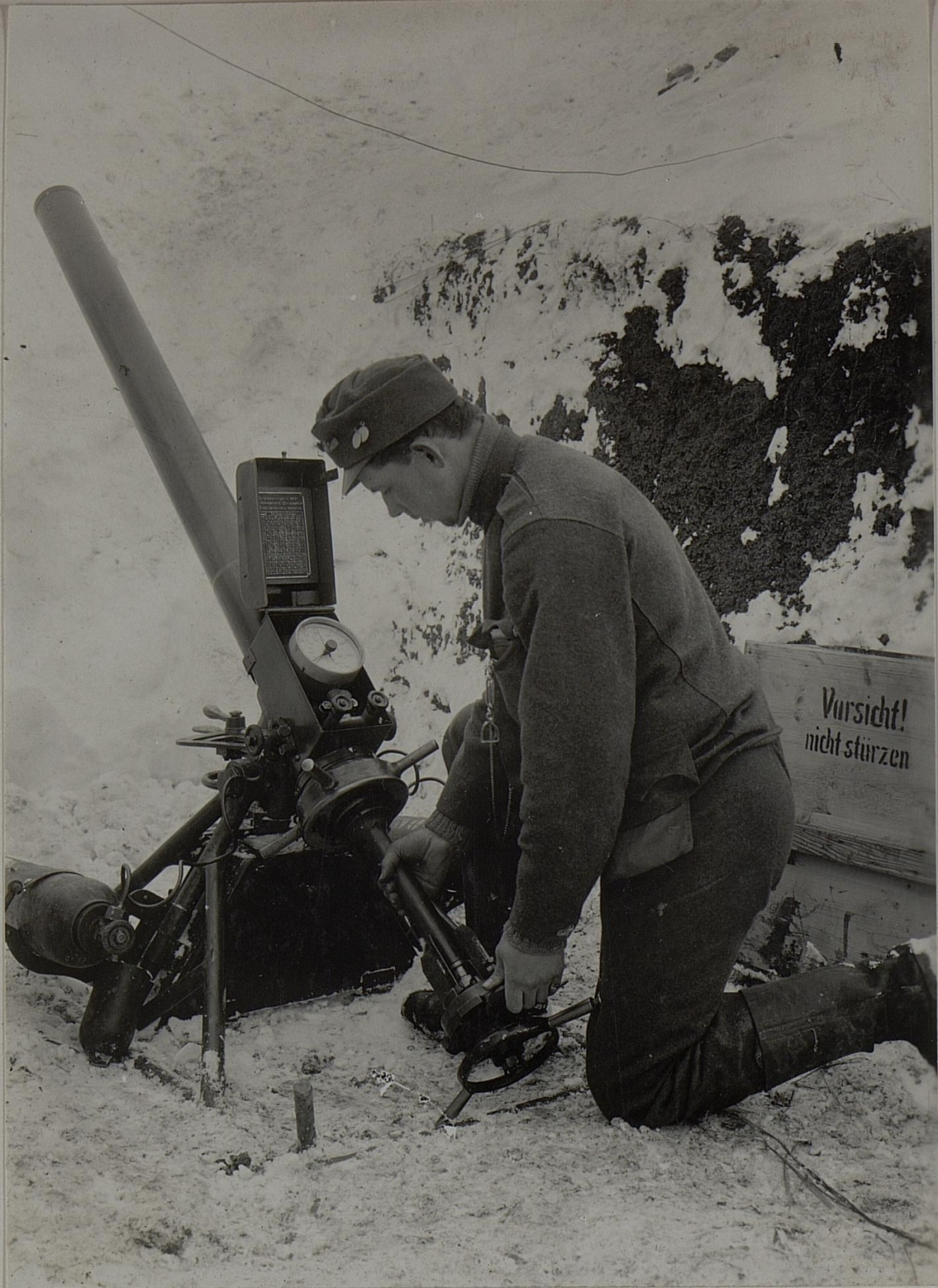
- Type: Medium trench mortar
- Place of origin: German Empire

Service history
- In service: 1915–1918
- Used by: Austria-Hungary
- Wars: World War I

Production history
- Designer: Ehrhardt & Sehmer
- Designed: 1914–1915
- Manufacturer: Ehrhardt & Sehmer
- Produced: 1915–1916

Specifications
- Mass: 126 kilograms (278 lb)
- Caliber: 105 millimetres (4.1 in)
- Traverse: 0°
- Maximum firing range: 500 metres (550 yd)

The 10.5 cm Luftminenwerfer M 15 (Pneumatic Trench Mortar) was a medium mortar used by Austria-Hungary in World War I. It was developed by the German firm of Ehrhardt & Sehmer. It was a rigid-recoil, muzzle-loading mortar on a fixed base that used compressed air to propel the mortar bomb to the target. Each cylinder of compressed air lasted for fifteen shots. A notable advantage was that the mortar had no firing signature, unlike conventional mortars with smoke and muzzle flash.

A batch of 25 mortars, 250 cylinders of compressed air and 10,000 complete bombs (i.e. with fuses) was ordered on 31 July 1915 for combat evaluation, but the manufacturer was unable to deliver the mortar bombs. They had to be manufactured by the Army itself. A slightly improved model was offered by Ehrhardt & Sehmer at the end of March 1916, but it was rejected because of the poor range of the ammunition and the difficulty in procuring it.

Ten trench mortar platoons, each with two weapons, were formed and deployed in February 1916, mainly to the Russian theater.

== Bibliography ==
- Ortner, M. Christian. The Austro-Hungarian Artillery From 1867 to 1918: Technology, Organization, and Tactics. Vienna, Verlag Militaria, 2007 ISBN 978-3-902526-13-7
