= Stokes mortar =

3 inch Stokes mortar
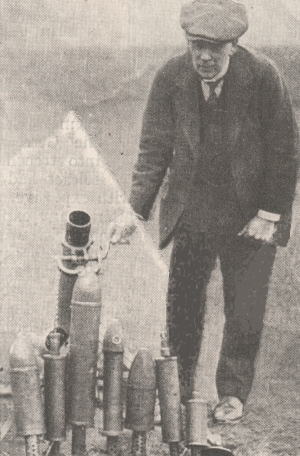
- Sir Wilfred Stokes with example of his mortar and bombs. Typical 3-inch bombs used are 2nd and 6th from left
- Type: Light mortar
- Place of origin: United Kingdom

Service history
- Used by: British Empire; Belgium; French Third Republic; Kingdom of Greece; Kingdom of Italy; Paraguay; Netherlands; Second Polish Republic; Portugal; Commonwealth of the Philippines; United States
- Wars: World War I; World War II; Banana Wars; Chaco War

Production history
- Designer: Sir Wilfred Stokes KBE
- Designed: 1915

Specifications
- Mass: 104 lb (47.2 kg) total
- Crew: 2
- Shell: HE 10 lb 11 oz (4.85 kg)
- Calibre: 3.2 in (81 mm)
- Action: Trip
- Elevation: 45–75°
- Rate of fire: 25 rpm (maximum); 6–8 rpm (sustained)
- Effective firing range: 750 yd (686 m)
- Maximum firing range: 800 yd (732 m)
- Filling: Amatol
- Filling weight: 2 lb 4 oz (1 kg)

The Stokes mortar was a British trench mortar designed by Sir Wilfred Stokes KBE that was issued to the British and U.S. armies, as well as the Portuguese Expeditionary Corps, during the latter half of the First World War. The 3-inch trench mortar was a smooth-bore, muzzle-loading weapon for high angles of fire. Although it was called a 3-inch mortar, its bore was actually 3.2 inches or 81 mm.

== Design ==
The Stokes mortar was a simple weapon, consisting of a smoothbore metal tube fixed to a base plate (to absorb recoil) with a lightweight bipod mount. When a mortar bomb was dropped into the tube, an impact sensitive primer in the base of the bomb would make contact with a firing pin at the base of the tube, and ignite the propellant charge in the base, launching the bomb towards the target. The warhead itself was detonated by an impact fuse on reaching the target.

The barrel was a seamless drawn-steel tube necked down at the breech or base end. A base cap was fitted to the breech end, within which a firing pin was secured, protruding into the barrel. The caps at each end of the bomb cylinder were 81 mm diameter. The bomb was fitted with a modified hand grenade fuse on the front, with a perforated tube containing a propellant charge and an impact-sensitive cap at the rear.

Range was determined by the amount of propellant charge used and the angle of the barrel. A basic propellant cartridge was used for all firing, and covered short ranges. Up to four additional "rings" of propellant were used for incrementally greater ranges. The four rings were supplied with the cartridge and gunners discarded the rings that were not needed.

One potential problem was the recoil, which was "exceptionally severe, because the barrel is only about 3 times the weight of the projectile, instead of about one hundred times the weight as in artillery. Unless the legs are properly set up they are liable to injury".

A modified version of the mortar, which fired a modern fin-stabilised streamlined projectile and had a booster charge for longer range, was developed after World War I; this was in effect a new weapon.

== History ==
Light mortars portable by one man had already been in use centuries earlier, but had fallen out of general usage since the Napoleonic era. With the many changes to battlefield doctrine during the First World War, the concept gained interest again. At first the British and French resorted to re-issuing these obsolete mortars; after modernised designs became available, the Stokes mortar in particular gained popularity.

Frederick Wilfred Scott Stokes designed the mortar in January 1915. The British Army was at the time trying to develop a weapon that would be a match for the Imperial German Army's Minenwerfer mortar, which was in use on the Western Front.

Stokes's design was initially rejected in June 1915 because it was unable to use existing stocks of British mortar ammunition. It took the intervention of David Lloyd George (at that time Minister of Munitions) and Lieutenant-Colonel J. C. Matheson of the Trench Warfare Supply Department (who reported to Lloyd George) to expedite manufacture of the Stokes mortar.

In the last quarter of 1915, 304 Stokes mortars were produced. Only 104 of these reached the front, however, the remainder being sent to training schools. The subcontracting-out of manufacture of the mortar mounting was undertaken in February 1916. In March 1916, it was announced the light trench mortars would be controlled by Infantry Brigades. The handbook for the Stokes trench mortar was issued to the infantry in April 1916. In total, 11,331 3-inch Stokes mortars were manufactured in Britain.

It remained in service into the Second World War, when it was superseded by the Ordnance ML 3 inch mortar, and some remained in use by New Zealand forces until after the Second World War.

Stokes was knighted as a Knight of the British Empire in 1917 for inventing the mortar. He was also given several forms of monetary reward by the Ministry of Munitions.

The French developed an improved version of the Stokes mortar as the Brandt Mle 27, further refined as the Brandt Mle 31; this design was widely copied with and without licence. Despite their indigenous production, out of 8,000 81 mm mortars in service with the French in 1939, 2,000 were of the original Mk. I build purchased from Great Britain.

== Usage ==
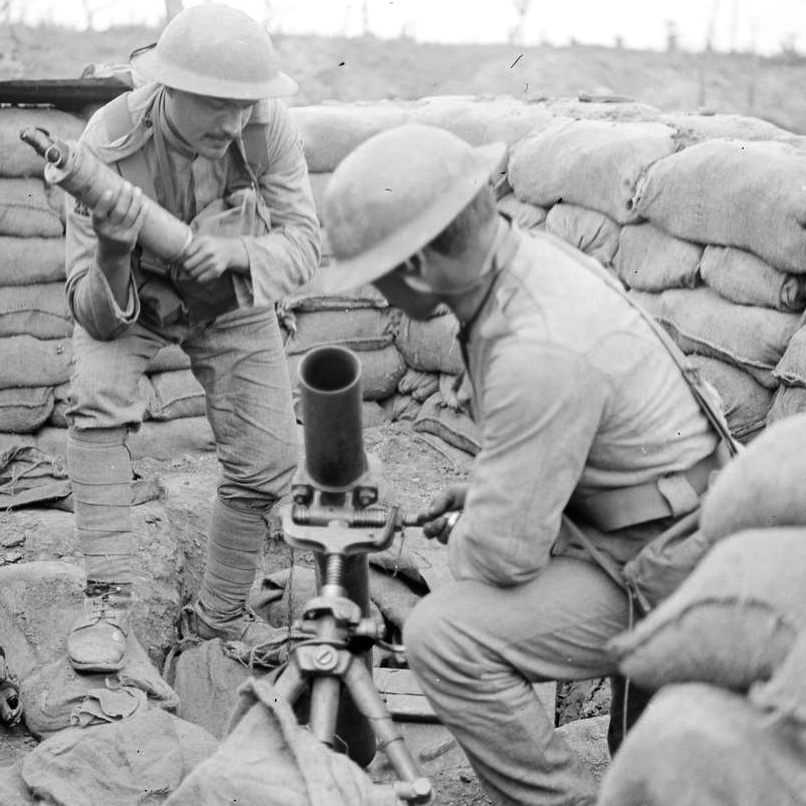
Portuguese Expeditionary Corps soldiers loading a Stokes mortar, on the Western Front during World War I.

In World War I, the Stokes mortar could fire as many as 25 bombs per minute and had a maximum range of 800 yards (732 m) firing the original cylindrical un-stabilised projectile. British Empire units had 1,636 Stokes mortars in service on the Western Front at the Armistice.

=== American usage ===
After American entry into World War I, the Stokes mortar was standardised as the "Mortar, Trench, 3", Mk. I" and "Mortar, Trench, 3", Mk. IA2." Although production of the weapon was started in the United States before the end of the war, few American-built weapons reached France and most of those actually used in combat were of British manufacture. It was used in the Banana Wars and helped American forces defeat Sandinista rebels during the Second Battle of Las Cruces on 1 January 1928. Refinements of the British Stokes mortar were made by French weapons designer Edgar Brandt in the interwar period, resulting in the Brandt mortar. The new weapon, which was adopted by the Americans as the M1 mortar and put into limited production starting in 1935, had a heavier barrel, cross-leveling device on the bipod, and a new base plate. By 1942, the Mk. I and Mk. IA2 had been fully supplanted by the M1 and reclassified as "limited standard."

=== Other usage ===
The Paraguayan Army made extensive use of the Stokes mortar during the Chaco War, especially as a siege weapon in the Battle of Boquerón in September 1932. The Bolivian Army also used them in the same conflict. Stokes mortars were widely used by the Republican Army during the Spanish Civil War, sold mostly by Poland. In September 1936, 44,000 Stokes rounds arrived in Spain.

=== South Persia Rifles usage ===
- Qajar Iran – South Persia Rifles received four Stokes mortars and 1,000 rounds of ammunition to complete its artillery complement.

== 4-inch variant ==
A 4-inch (102 mm) calibre version of the Stokes design was used to fire smoke, poison gas, and thermite (incendiary) rounds. A quantity of just under thirty were first used at the Battle of Loos in September 1915. Up to the end of 1918, a total of 1,123 were manufactured. This weapon, used solely by the Special Brigade of the Royal Engineers, should be considered a separate weapon from the standard "3-inch" 81-millimetre (3 in) version used by the infantry.

== Image gallery ==
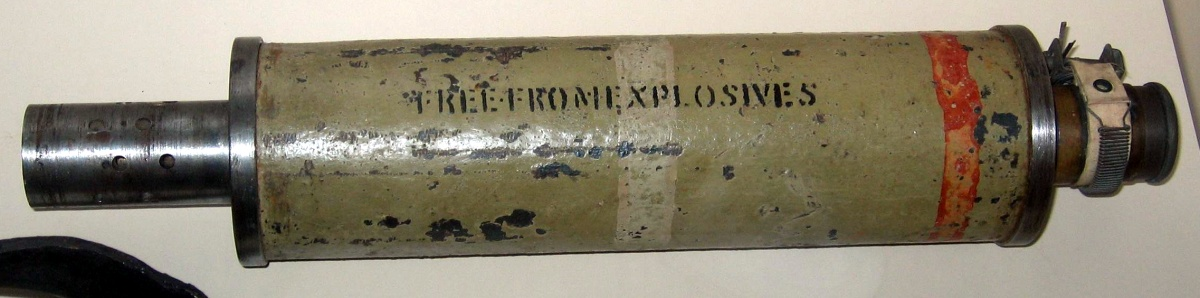
High explosive bomb

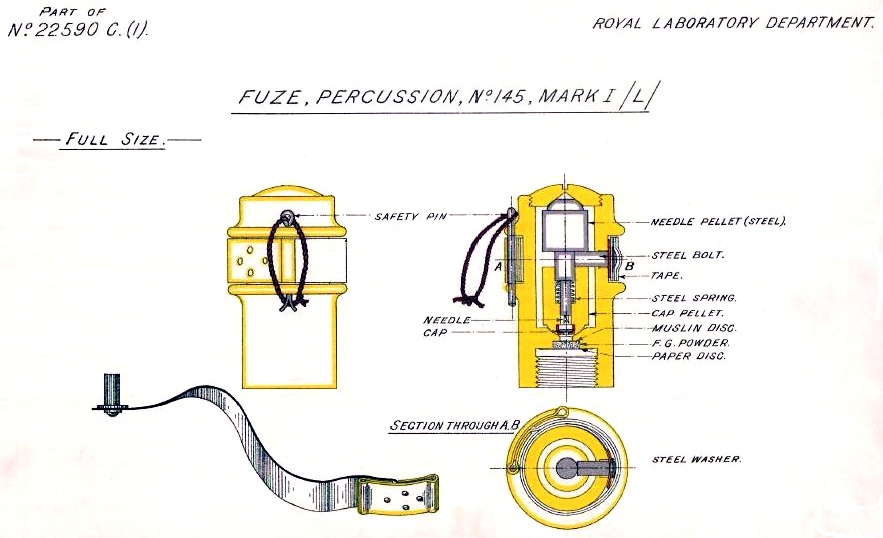
No. 145 percussion fuze

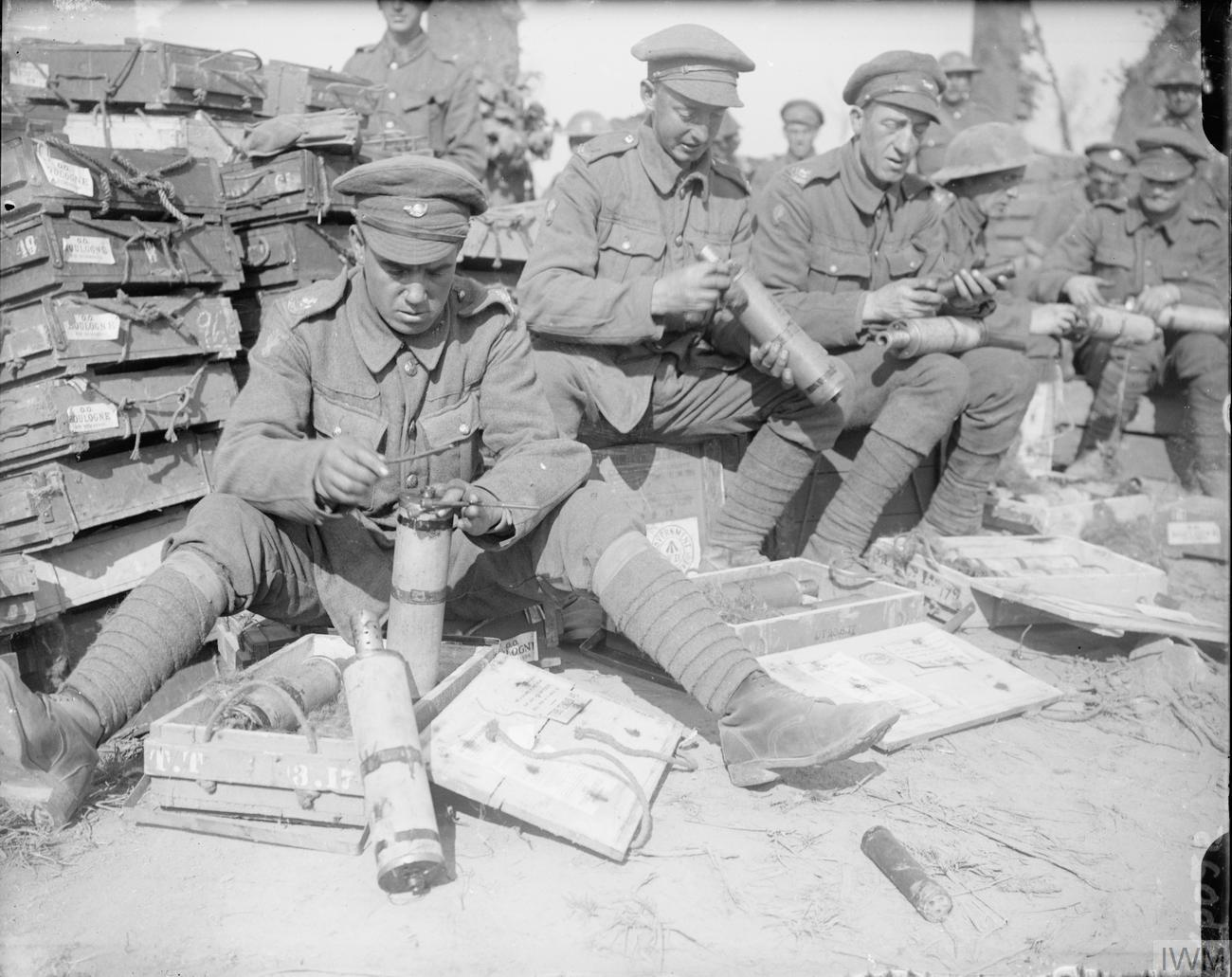
Men of the KOYLI fusing Stokes shells near Wieltje, 1 October 1917

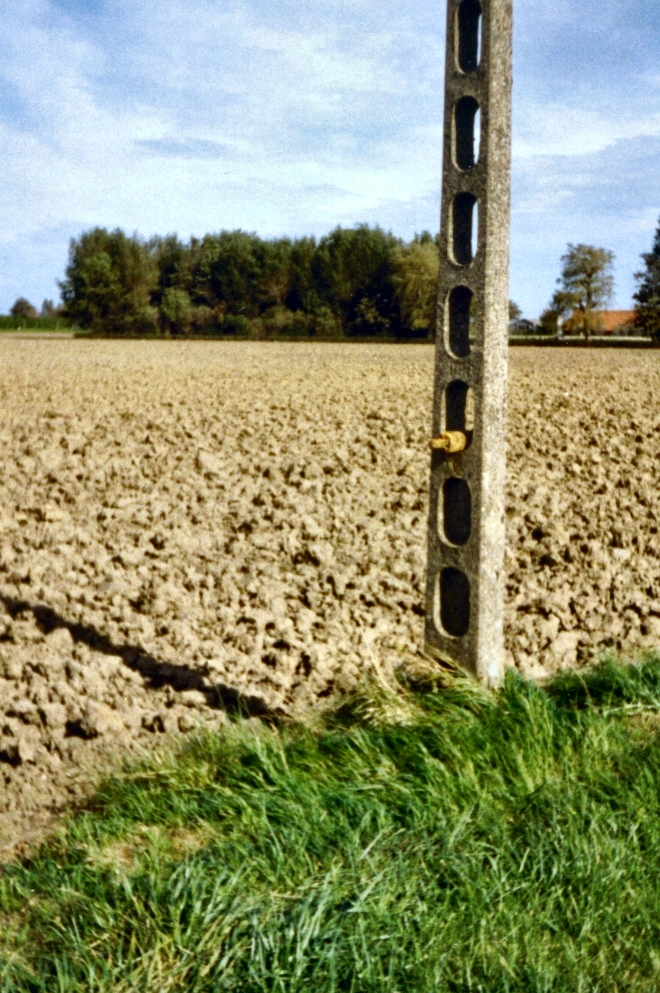
An intact Stokes shell found during the iron harvest in 2004 near Ypres and placed on a telegraph pole for collection and disposal

Displayed at Soldiers' Memorial Gardens in Unley, South Australia.

== Surviving examples ==
- Australian War Memorial, Canberra
- An example with bombs is displayed at l'hotel de ville d'Arras, France.

== See also ==
- List of infantry mortars
- 7.58 cm Minenwerfer—Approximate German equivalent

== Bibliography ==
- Range Table For 3-Inch Stokes Mortar (Report). United Kingdom War Office. September 1917.
- "Stokes' trench howitzer, 3", mark I". US Army War College, January 1918. via Combined Arms Research Library
- Field Artillery Notes No. 7. US Army War College August 1917. via Combined Arms Research Library
- Canfield, Bruce N. (2000). "The Three Inch Stokes Mortar". U.S. Infantry Weapons of the First World War. Andrew Mowbray Pub. ISBN 978-0917218903.
- Farndale, M. (1986). Western Front 1914–18. History of the Royal Regiment of Artillery. London: Royal Artillery Institution. ISBN 978-1-870114-00-4.
- Ruffell, W. L. "The Stokes Mortar". The Mortar. Archived from the original on 14 January 2015.
- Saunders, Anthony (2008). A MUSE OF FIRE; British Trench Warfare Munitions, their Invention, Manufacture and Tactical Employment on the Western Front, 1914–18 (PDF) (PhD). University of Exeter.
- Zook, David (1960). The conduct of the Chaco War. Bookman Associates.
