= 7.58 cm Minenwerfer =

7.58 cm Minenwerfer a.A.
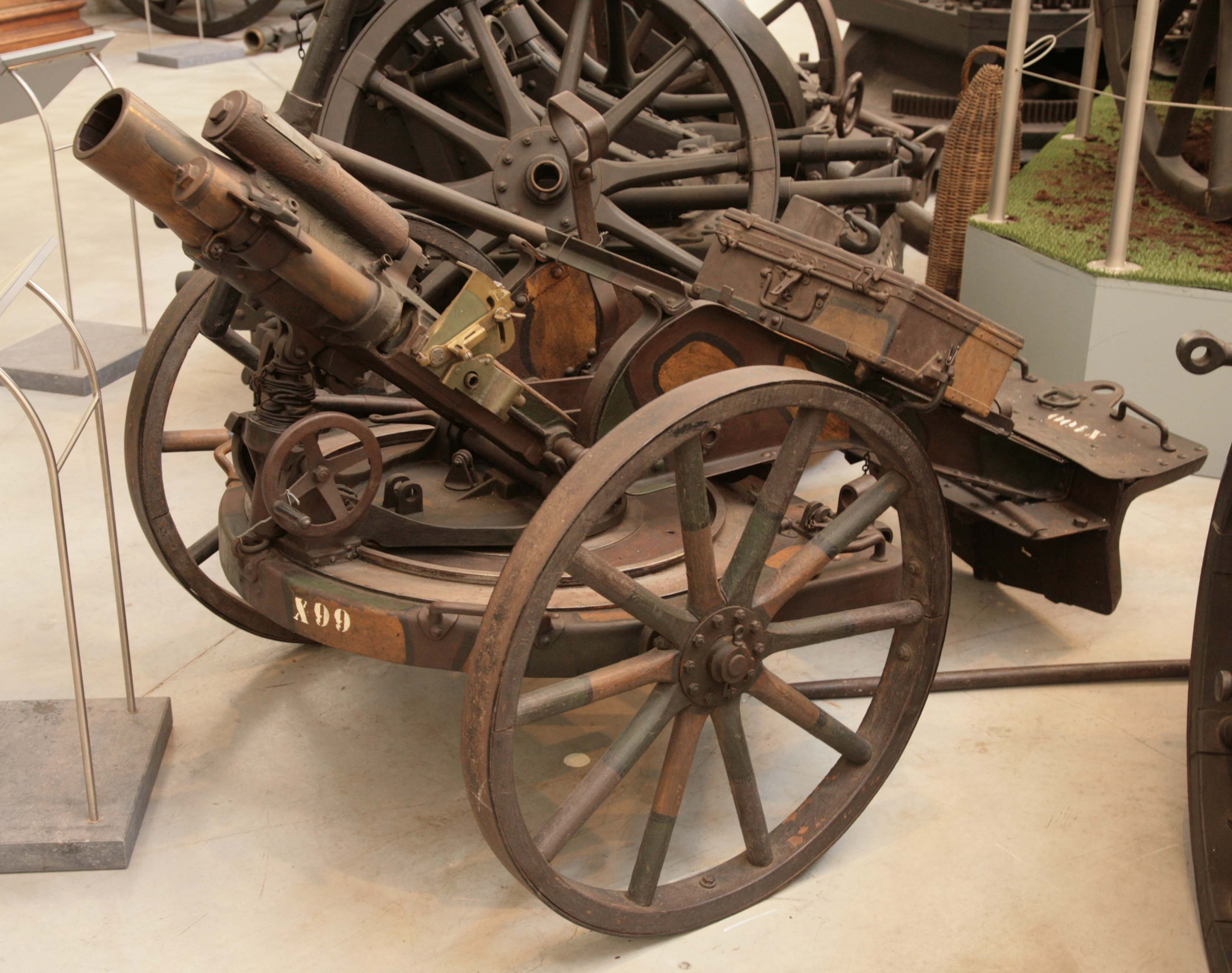
- A 7.58 cm Minenwerfer at the Brussels Army Museum
- Type: Light mortar
- Place of origin: German Empire

Service history
- Used by: German Empire
- Wars: World War I

Production history
- Designer: Rheinmetall
- Designed: 1909
- Manufacturer: Rheinmetall
- Variants: n.A.

Specifications
- Mass: 147 kg (324 lb)
- Barrel length: 23.5 cm (9.3 in) L/3.1
- Crew: 5-6
- Shell: 4.6 kg (10 lb 2 oz)
- Caliber: 75.8 mm (2.98 in)
- Recoil: hydro-spring
- Carriage: platform
- Elevation: + 45 to + 78 degrees
- Traverse: 7°
- Rate of fire: up to 45 rounds per minute
- Muzzle velocity: 90 m/s (259 ft/s)
- Effective firing range: 300 m (330 yd) minimum
- Maximum firing range: 1,300 m (1,400 yd)

The 7.58 cm Minenwerfer a.A. (alter Art or "old model"), also 7.58 cm Leichter Minenwerfer (7.58 cm leMW, sometimes also LMW; "light mine launcher"), was a German First World War mortar.

== History ==
The Russo-Japanese War of 1905 had shown the value of mortars against modern fieldworks and fortifications and the Germans were in the process of fielding a whole series of mortars before the beginning of World War I. Their term for them was Minenwerfer, literally mine-thrower; they were initially assigned to engineer units in their siege warfare role. By the Winter of 1916–17, they were transferred to infantry units where the leMW's light weight permitted them to accompany the foot-soldiers in the advance.

In common with Rheinmetall's other Minenwerfer designs, the leMW was a rifled muzzle-loader that had hydraulic cylinders on each side of the tube to absorb the recoil forces and spring recuperators to return the tube to the firing position. It had a rectangular firing platform with limited traverse and elevation. Wheels could be added to ease transportation or it could be carried by at least six men.

In 1916, a new model, designated as the n.A. or neuer Art ("new version"), was fielded that included a circular firing platform, giving a turntable effect, which permitted a full 360 degree traverse. It also had a longer 16 inches (410 mm) barrel and could be used for direct fire between 0° and 27° elevation if the new 90 kg (200 lb) trail was fitted to absorb the recoil forces. A carriage change allowed the Minenwerfer to be pressed into service as an anti-tank gun. Later a flat-track carriage was created that allowed the mortar to be used both as a high-angle and flat trajectory launcher, performing some of the same tasks as field artillery.

After World War I ended, the 7.58 cm Minenwerfer continued to be used in the Interwar Period by Germany and was used by Belgium into the 1930s.

== Gallery ==
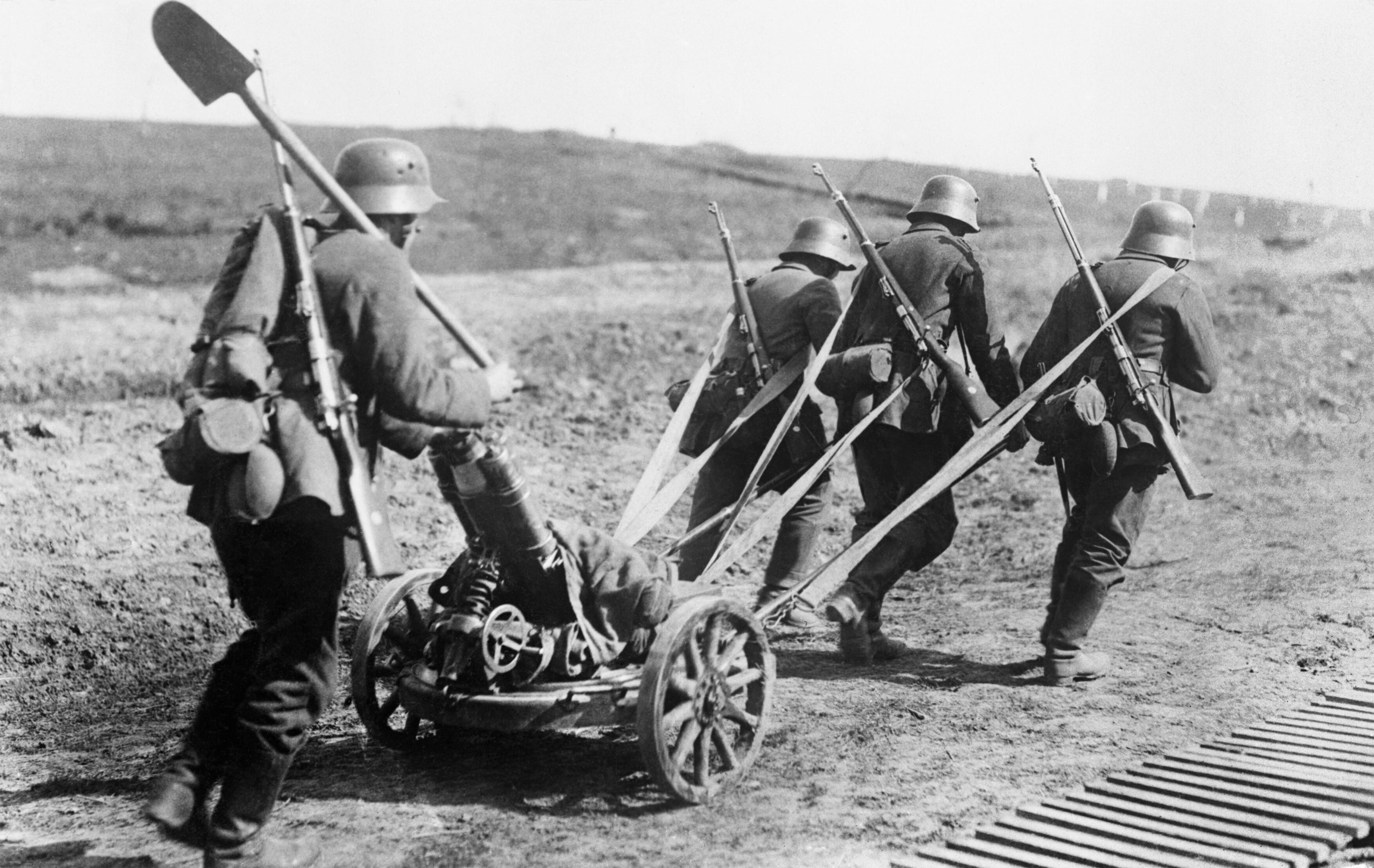
German infantrymen towing the minenwerfer in 1918

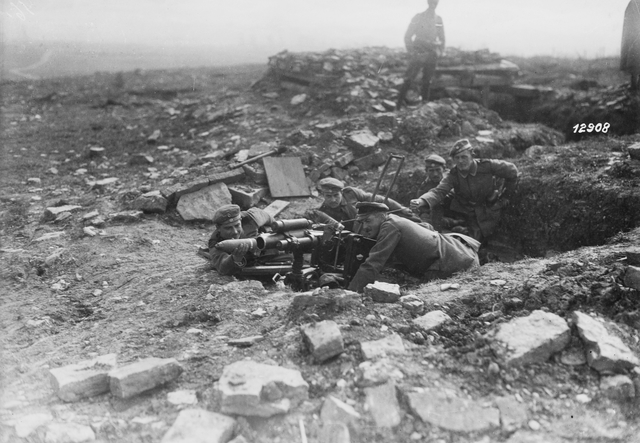
German troops using the minenwerfer as an anti-tank gun in October 1918

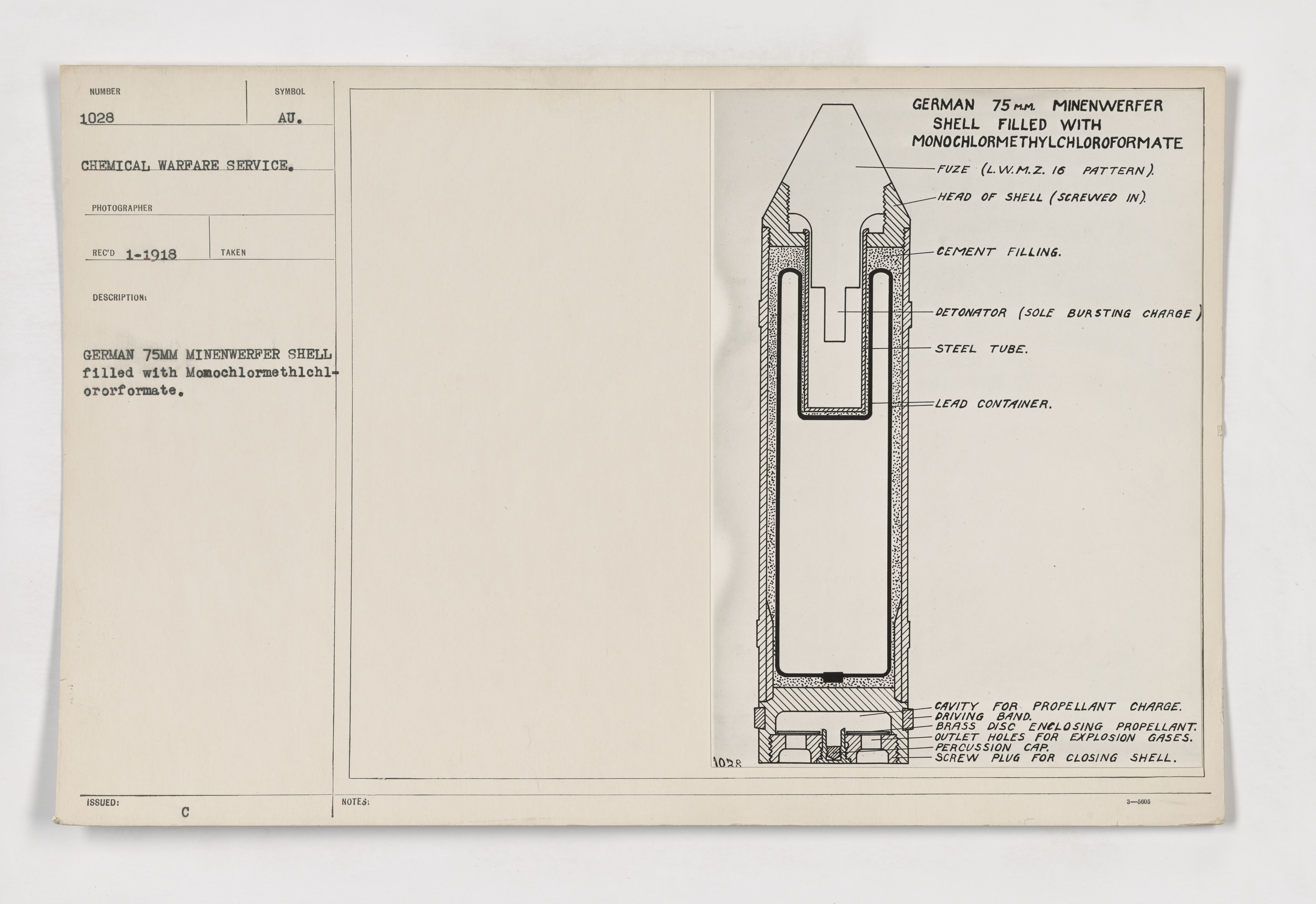
A diagram of a 7.58 cm tear gas (chloromethyl chloroformate) shell

== See also ==
- Minenwerfer

=== Weapons of comparable role, performance and era ===
- Stokes mortar: approximate British equivalent
