= Commando mortar =

Lightweight infantry mortar

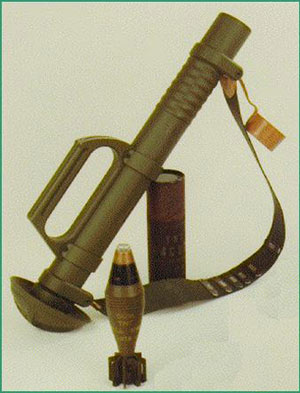
Austrian Hirtenberger M6C-210

The term Commando mortar refers to a class of lightweight infantry mortars designed for maximum portability and rapid deployment with a caliber of 60 mm (2.4 in) or less in diameter, at the expense of accuracy and repeatability. The earliest models were introduced from the 1930s.

Commando mortars often feature design simplifications such as straps instead of bipods, carrying handles, and limited aiming equipment. Some of these straps are marked with measurements, with the intent that the mortarman step on a marked point of the sling and pull it taut, at which point the mortar will be angled so as to fire to the range marked at that point of the sling.

== Users ==
- Empire of Japan: Type 10 and Type 89 grenade discharger 50mm, second world war.
- Soviet Union: "Spade Mortar" 37mm, second world war.
- Austria: Hirtenberger M6C-210 Commando Mortar 60mm
- Ireland: Denel Land Systems M-1 60mm commando mortar
- South Africa: Denel LS "patrol mortar" or M-4 Commando Mortar 60mm
- Iran: DIO "Marsh mortar" 37mm
- United Kingdom: L9A1 51 mm Light Mortar
- France: LGI Mle F1 51mm mortier léger
- Portugal: INDEP M/968 60mm
- Yugoslavia: M70 Mortar 60mm
- Myanmar: BA-100 60 mm Mortar.
- Myanmar: MA-9 60 mm Mortar.
- Israel: Soltam C03 Mortar 60mm
- Iran: DIO HADID 60 mm HM12 and HM13 Commando mortars
- Spain: ECIA Mortar 60mm
- Peru: DC-M37C1 60mm Patrol Mortar
- Turkey: MKEK 60mm Commando Mortar
- Netherlands: M6C-640, light mortar 60mm
- Thailand: Royal Thai Army Ordnance 60mm Mortar WPC A3 (Commando)
- Georgia: STC Delta GNM-60 mkudro 60mm
- Czech Republic: LRM vz. 99 ANTOS 60mm mortar
- Iraq: Al-Jaleel 60mm Commando Mortar
- Liberation Tigers of Tamil Eelam

== See also ==
- Coehorn
- Grenade launcher
- List of infantry mortars
