= LGI Mle F1 =

LGI
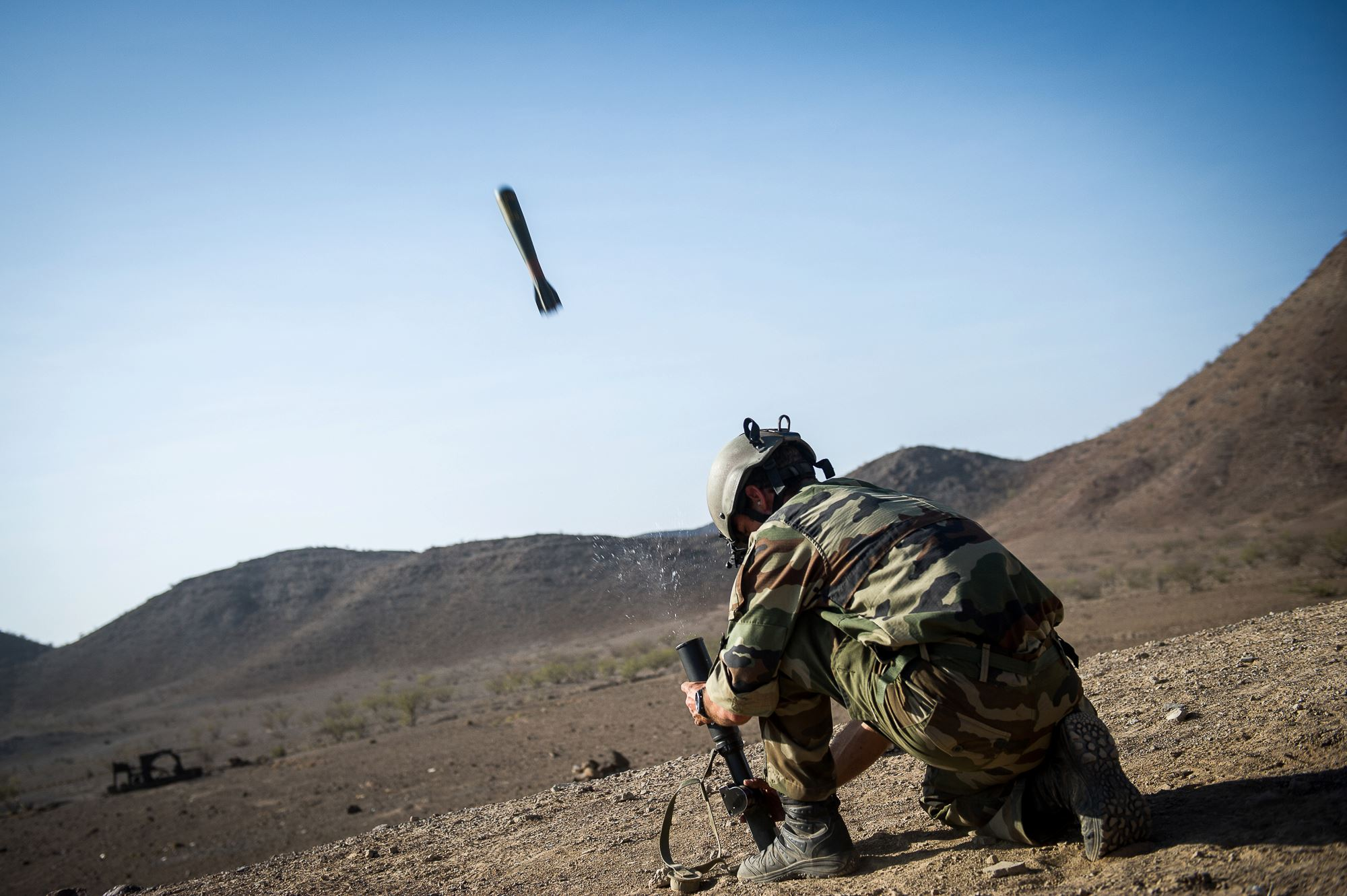
- Member of the 13th Parachute Dragoon Regiment firing an LGI (Djibouti, 2012)
- Type: Mortar / Grenade launcher
- Place of origin: France

Service history
- Used by: France; Monaco

Production history
- Manufacturer: Titanite S.A.

Specifications
- Mass: 4.8 kg
- Length: 605 mm
- Crew: 1
- Cartridge: 51 mm grenade
- Rate of fire: up to 30 rounds per minute
- Effective firing range: 675 metres

The LGI Mle F1 (Lance-grenade individuel Mle F1, "individual grenade launcher Model F1") is a lightweight, close-support infantry weapon designed to be used by one man to provide indirect fire. The LGI has been used by the French Army since the 1990s and fires high explosive, smoke, and illumination rounds.

== Deployment ==
French squads include a 300 Meter fireteam called "Équipe Alpha" (consisting of a team leader armed with a Heckler & Koch HK416 and two grenadiers-voltigeurs, each armed with a Heckler & Koch HK416 assault rifle as well as an AT4 anti-tank weapon) and a 600 Meter fireteam or "Équipe Bravo" (again with a team leader equipped with Heckler & Koch HK416 and two grenadiers-voltigeurs as well with one armed with a FN Minimi light machine gun and the other with both a Heckler & Koch HK416 and LGI).

=== Operation ===
The launcher uses a closed combustion chamber to capture the propulsion gases. The propellant charge is inserted into the tail of each round and transmits an ignition impulse via an enclosed internal system, assuring little in the way of noise, muzzle flash, smoke, or thermal signature. The noise made on firing is only 52 dB, making it hard to detect the launching point and high rates of fire are possible as the weapon does not heat up.

== Ammunition ==
- 51 mm (GRExPL AP LGI F1) High Explosive bomb 51 mm
- 51 mm ( GR 51 FUM PH LGI F1) smoke bomb 51 mm
- 47 mm (GR 47 ECL LGI F1) Flare 47 mm
- Practice bombs

An Infrared bomb is in development that will facilitate low light engagements when used in conjunction with a Night Vision Device.

== See also ==
- Commando mortar
- Type 89 Grenade Discharger
- 37mm Spade Mortar
- 37mm Marsh Mortar
- L9A1 51 mm Light Mortar
