= 1949–1950 French dockers' strikes =

Communist-led strikes against the First Indochina War

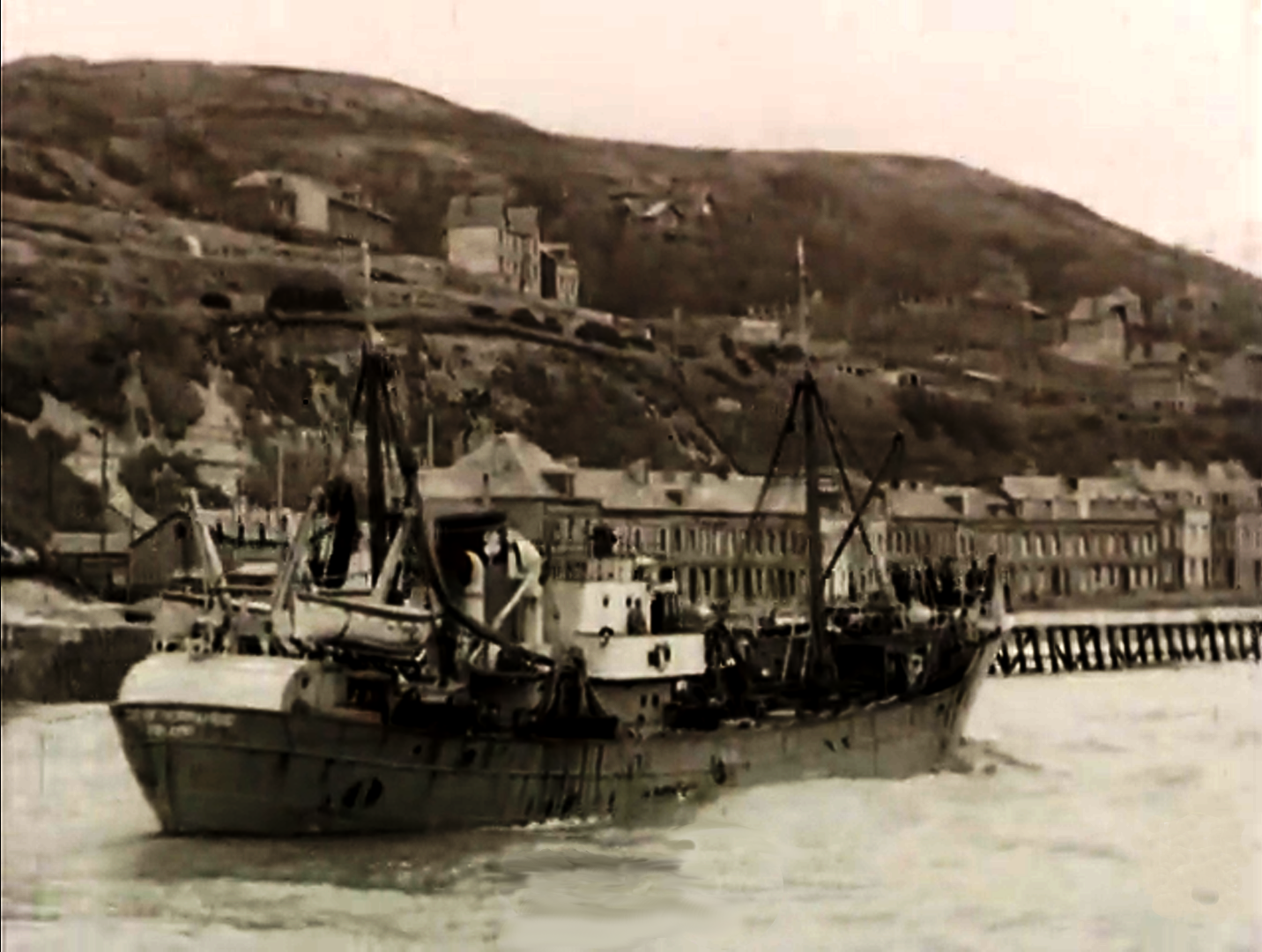
A French boat near Normandy in 1950

Between autumn 1949 and summer 1950, more than 35,000 French workers, primarily dockworkers, attempted to protest the First Indochina War alongside other grievances. This was achieved by blocking the transport of military equipment from French ports to assist in the war effort. Strikes began at Marseille on 2 November 1949 and spread to other ports until 18 April 1950. Action took place in Dunkirk, Rouen, Saint-Nazaire, Marseille, Nice, La Pallice, Bordeaux, La Rochelle, Brest and Tunis as well by Algerian dockers. Alongside demonstrations during the trial of Henri Martin, the strike represented one of the main ways the French Communist Party opposed the Indochina war.

== Background ==
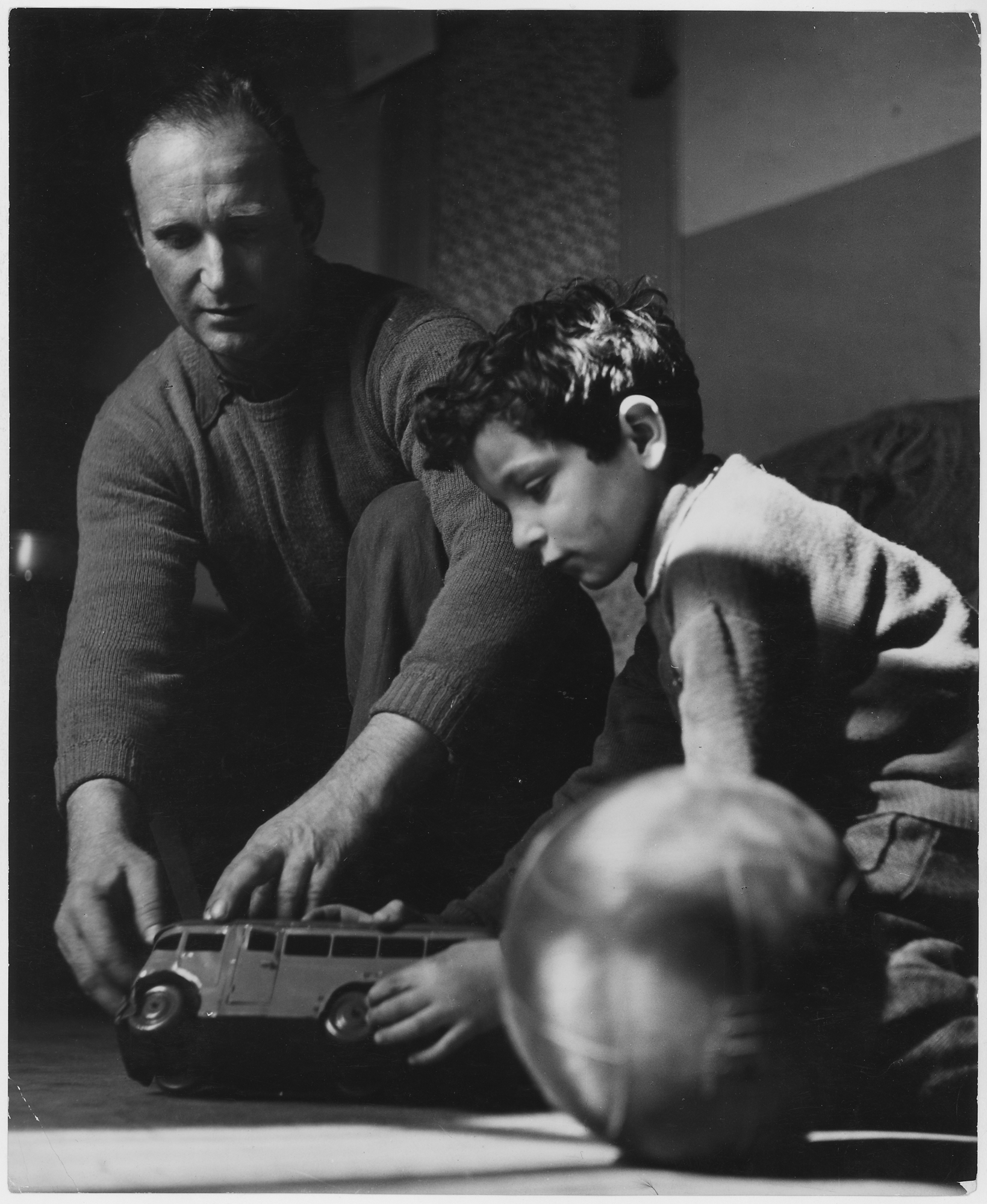
Nicolas Derybalsky, a poor Marseille dockworker, photographed in a similar year to the strikes

A communist-led sailors strike had occurred in French ports in 1948, including to protest the Marshall Plan. The sailors strike at Marseille ended in December 1948. In March 1947, communist representatives in the National Assembly refused to vote for funding for the Indochina War. The war was considered by the communists and the Confédération Générale du Travail (CGT) as a "prelude to a third global conflict" which was leading France to be more integrated in the Western bloc.

At the Cominform meeting in November 1949, the French Communist Party (PCF) outlined its support for an immediate end to the war and for the success of the Vietnamese Liberation Movement. The party explained how French dockworkers were already refusing to unload ships bound for Indochina.

In July 1649, Jacques Cheragay's account of torture by the French Army in Indochina, published in the Catholic newspaper Témoignage chrétien, made the French public aware of atrocities being committed in Indochina. Paul Mus, head of the Colonial Academy and specialist in Indochina, publicly condemned the French use of torture in a collection of essays (entitled Non, pas ça!) and also wrote anti-war articles in Témoignage chrétien from late 1940 to early 1950.

== Events ==
As reported by the Civil and Military Gazette (Lahore) at the time, "the General Federation of Labour Dockers unions of Marseille" called on other workers to join them in refusing to load arms and ammunition for the war in Indochina in November 1949. In December 1949, the PCF Central Committee met to discuss direct action against the war. The example of the Marseille dockers strike was praised. Shortly after this meeting, Laurent Casanova led a campaign, calling upon members of the French Seamen and Dockers Federation, to prevent the transfer of American arms in French ports including Nantes, La Rochelle, Saint-Nazaire, Brest, Rouen, Le Havre, Marseille, and Toulon.

In Cherbourg, law enforcement and members of the military were required to intervene to oversee the unloading of the American ship Importer which was carrying arms and ammunition. According to contemporary reporting by the Grimsby Daily Telegraph, railway and mine strikes were organised by the CGT in February 1950. In response, ministers met to respond agitation against the Atlantic Pact and Indochina War. The newspaper also reported that on 27 March, a 24 hour strike by dockers at Marseille and Sete for wage claims and to boycott arms shipments to Indochina held up more than 130 ships. On 4 March 1950, amidst tensions in the Assemblée Nationale with Premier Georges Bidault lacking a majority, the CGT called workers on strike to prevent US military equipment being unloaded which might be used against the Soviet Union under the terms of the North Atlantic Pact of Defense. Strike breakers were employed between January and mid-March 1950.

== Cultural depictions ==
Film

Paul Carpita's 1955 full-length film Le Rendez-vous des quais (meeting on the docks) focused on the strikes in Marseille. Despite being realised after the withdrawal of French troops from Vietnam, the film was censored for its political message before its release and was not granted authorisation for public screening. Robert Ménégoz's short-film Vivent les dockers also depicts the strikes of dockworkers across France.

Painting

Boris Taslitzky's painting Riposte (1951) depicts French riot police, the Compagnies Républicaines de Sécurité, violently suppressing the dockers strike at Port de Bouc near Marseille. The work reflected Taslitzky's horror at the actions of the police, painting one policeman to resemble Hitler and government ministers ordered it be removed from the Salon d'Automne. Antoine Serra's painting entitled La grève des dockers contre la guerre d’Indochine (the dockers' strike against the Indochina War), created in 1950, is held in the Marseille History Museum.
