= List of equipment of the French Army =

This is a list of equipment currently in service with the French Army. Figures are provided by the Ministry of Armed Forces for 2021.

== Personal equipment ==
=== Uniforms ===
Name	Origin	Type	Photo	Notes
Field uniforms
Bariolage Multi-Environnement (BME)	France	Combat uniform		Current standard camouflage of the French Armed Forces.
Camouflage BTE (Bariolage théâtre européen)	France	Combat uniform		Standard camouflage pattern of the French Armed Forces; In May 2022, it was announced a new camouflage pattern, the Bariolage Multi-Environnement (BME), was being developed and that it would replace the BTE as the standard camouflage pattern. Delivery of the BME has started as of late 2024 as planned with 6000 uniform already delivered.
Camouflage BZD (Bariolage zone désertique)	France	Combat uniform		Desert camouflage of the French Armed Forces
Camouflage BZE (Bariolage zone enneigée)	France	Combat uniform		Snow camouflage of the French Armed Forces; Typically worn by the Alpine Hunters and other mountain units
COM FST-specific camouflage	France; United States	Combat uniform		Various uniforms seen worn by operators of the French Army Special Forces Command's units.
Helmets
Casque TC F NVG V2 Casque TC 3001/3002	France; United States	Combat helmet		Variants of the MICH and manufactured by MSA Gallet; TC F NVG V2 helmets seen used by some conventional units of the French army and TC 3001/3002 (pictured) seen used by special forces operators; Entered service in 2009 and 2010 respectively; Still occasionally seen used
Ops-Core helmet	United States	Combat helmet		Used by the Special Operations Command's units as well as by specialized conventional units such as the para commandos of the 11th Airborne Brigade's Parachute Commando Group (GCP) and the mountain commandos of the 27th Mountain Infantry Brigade's Mountain Commando Group (GCM)
Casque FÉLIN Casque balistique F3.	France	Combat helmet		First delivered in 2010, the FÉLIN ballistic helmet is the SPECTRA helmet's successor. It is an integral component of the FÉLIN system.; The F3 helmet to be delivered from 2020 onwards and is an evolution of the FÉLIN. It will equip all army soldiers and meet the overall objective of renewing the armed forces' "small equipment" in accordance with the 2019-2025 Military Programming Law.
Ballistic vests
Structure Modulaire Balistique (SMB)	France; Norway	Bulletproof vest		Standard-issue bulletproof vest of the French Armed Forces.; Designed by the Norwegian company NFM Group and manufactured by Plastimor, its Lorient-based French subsidiary; First units delivered in 2017 and 60,000 in service as of March 2022; 5,900 SMB V2 units, an evolution of the SMB, have been delivered as of March 2022
COM FST-specific ballistic vests	France	Bulletproof vest		Various bulletproof vests seen worn by the French Army Special Forces Command's units.
Boots
HAIX Centre Europe (HAIX Nepal Pro)	Germany; France	Combat boots		Standard combat boots of the French army
Meindl Desert Defence	Germany	Combat boots		Hot climate combat boots of the French army

=== Optronic devices and observation systems ===
Name	Origin	Type	Photo	Notes
Safran Vectronix Vector 21	France; Switzerland	Multifunctional optronic device		Succeeded the Leica Vector in general service; The Vector 21 increases the range for distance measurements up to 12 km. It also has a 1,550 nm laser invisible to image intensification devices, providing an added level of security.
Safran Vectronix JIM LR	France; Switzerland	Multifunctional optronic device		Long-range, multifunctional, infrared binoculars; Equips conventional units; Provides optimal day and night vision up to 10 km for threat detection, target identification and intelligence gathering on all terrains and in all weather conditions.
Safran Vectronix JIM Compact	France; Switzerland	Multifunctional optronic device		Lightweight, multifunctional, long-range infrared binoculars; Equips the Special Operations Command's units as well as specialized conventional units such as the Parachute Commando Group (GCP) and Mountain Commando Group (GCM); Allows operators to carry out missions of surveillance and geolocation of targets up to 12 km and is usable even in the most extreme environments. It notably combines advanced capabilities, such as See-Spot, low-light positive identification, transmission of information and filled-in images, channel fusion, and new functionalities dedicated to long-range fire, air support and artillery.
Safran Vectronix Moskito TI	France; Switzerland	Multifunctional optronic device		Multifunctional stealth binoculars; Used by the Special Operations Command's units, the Parachute Commando Group and Mountain Commando Group; Offers full situational awareness 24 hours a day, notably providing distance measurement and geolocation of targets in just a few seconds up to 10 km, day and night. Safran claims it is the best-in-class in terms of both recognition capability and functionality.
Thales JVN O-NYX	France	Night vision device		Successor of the Thales OB70 Lucie and meant to equip dismounted French units; Entered service in 2020; 10,000 units out of 15,000 ordered were delivered as of February 2023. An additional batch of 4,000 O-NYX was ordered the same month, with delivery of all 19,000 units expected by 2025.
Thales JVN Bonie HP (High Performance)	France	Night vision device		Equips the Special Operations Command's units, the Parachute Commando Group and Mountain Commando Group since 2019

=== Special equipment ===
Name	Origin	Type	Photo	Notes
FÉLIN system	France	Integrated combat technology		Delivered between 2010 and 2015; New updated version of the FÉLIN system in 2016; The total cost of the program for 18,552 systems issued to 18 regiments was estimated to be €1.07 billion (FY2016); 23,065 systems in service as of 2021

== Infantry equipment ==
=== Pistols ===
Name	Origin	Type	Cartridge	Photo	Notes
Glock 17	Austria	Semi-automatic pistol	9×19mm Parabellum		In January 2020, it was announced the Glock 17 Gen 5 FR, a custom-made fifth generation model of the Glock 17 ("FR" standing for "France"), had been selected to be the new standard-issue pistol of the French Armed Forces, replacing the MAC 50 and PAMAS G1. 74,596 units were ordered with 80% for the French Army.; Full delivery of the order was completed in October 2022, with 74,600 units in total received.
PAMAS G1	France	Semi-automatic pistol	9×19mm Parabellum		French-manufactured variant of the Beretta 92; Entered service with the national gendarmerie in 1989, with the Air Force in 1992, and with the Army and Navy in 1999; 97,502 units in service in 2002; Also being replaced by the Glock 17 Gen 5 FR since 2020
HK USP Compact Tactical	Germany	Semi-automatic pistol	.45 ACP		Seen used by the Special Operations Command's units and some conventional units such as army engineer divers

=== Submachine guns ===
Name	Origin	Type	Cartridge	Photo	Notes
HK MP5 A5 HK MP5 SD3	West Germany Germany	Submachine gun	9×19mm Parabellum	Heckler & Koch MP5 b Heckler Koch MP5	Used by the Special Operations Command's units
HK MP7 A1 HK MP7 A2	Germany	Submachine gun	4.6×30mm		Used by the Special Operations Command's units
FN P90	Belgium	Submachine gun	FN 5.7×28mm		Used by the Special Operations Command's units

=== Assault rifles ===
Name	Origin	Type	Cartridge	Photo	Notes
FAMAS F1	France	Assault rifle	5.56×45mm NATO		Service rifle of the French Armed Forces with over 700,000 units delivered; Entered service in 1978; Being phased out and replaced with the HK416 F since 2017
HK416 F HK416 D14.5RS HK416 A5	Germany	Assault rifle	5.56×45mm NATO		In 2017, the HK416 F, a custom-made model of the HK416 ("F" standing for "France"), was selected to replace the FAMAS as the standard-issue rifle of the French Armed Forces. The Aimpoint CompM5 was selected the following year to be the standard-issue sight for the rifle. 117,000 HK416 F have been ordered and 70,340 units have been delivered as of March 2023.; The HK416 was already in service with the Special Operations Command's units since 2007, a decade before its selection to equip conventional forces. As of 2021, it still is the most commonly used assault rifle by French special forces operators.
FN SCAR-L	Belgium	Assault rifle	5.56×45mm NATO		Used by the Special Operations Command's units and the Parachute Commando Group
SIG MCX VIRTUS	United States	Assault rifle	5.56×45mm NATO.300 AAC Blackout		Used by the Special Operations Command's units and the Mountain Commando Group
SIG SG 553	Switzerland	Assault rifle	5.56×45mm NATO		Used by the Special Operations Command's units and conventional diving units
AK-47	Poland	Assault rifle	7.62×39mm		WBP Rogow Jack rifles; Used for foreign weapons training and foreign troops instruction dispensed by the 51st Infantry Regiment and the 17th Artillery Group.

=== Sniper and anti-materiel rifles ===
Name	Origin	Type	Cartridge	Photo	Notes
FN SCAR-H PR	Belgium	Designated marksman rifle Sniper rifle	7.62×51mm NATO		Selected in 2019 to replace the FR F2; The full delivery of the 2,620 rifles, 1,096 infrared optronic modules and 1,766 light intensification optronic modules ordered was completed in February 2023.
HK 417	Germany	Battle rifle Designated marksman rifle	7.62×51mm NATO		Used by the Special Operations Command's units and conventional troops
PGM Ultima Ratio	France	Sniper rifle	7.62×51mm NATO		Used by the Special Operations Command's units
Sako TRG-42	Finland	Sniper rifle	.300 Winchester Magnum.338 Lapua Magnum		Used by the Special Operations Command's units and some conventional units
Cadex CDX-40 Shadow (Elsa)	Canada	Sniper rifle	.408 CT		Used by the Special Operations Command's units
PGM Hécate II	France	Anti-materiel rifle	.50 BMG		Used by the Special Operations Command's units and conventional units
Barrett M107	United States	Anti-materiel rifle	.50 BMG		Used by the Special Operations Command's units

=== Machine guns ===
Name	Origin	Type	Cartridge	Photo	Notes
FN Minimi Para	Belgium	Light machine gun	5.56×45mm NATO		Widely used in the French Armed Forces
FN Evolys	Belgium	Light machine gun	5.56×45mm NATO; 7.62×51mm NATO		Delivered in 2022; Used by the Special Operations Command's units
FN MAG 58	Belgium	General purpose machine gun	7.62×51mm NATO		Selected in 2010 to replace the ANF1; 10,881 units ordered in 2011
M2 Browning	United States	Heavy machine gun	.50 BMG		Used by the Special Operations Command's units and conventional forces
M134 Minigun	United States	Rotary medium machine gun	7.62×51mm NATO		Used by the Special Operations Command's units

=== Shotguns ===
Name	Origin	Type	Cartridge	Photo	Notes
Benelli M4 Super 90	Italy	Semi-automatic shotgun	12-gauge		Used by the Special Operations Command's units and some conventional units
Benelli Supernova Tactical	Italy	Pump-action shotgun	12-gauge		Selected the Benelli Supernova Tactical in 2022 as the new service shotgun.
Mossberg 500	United States	Pump-action shotgun	12-gauge		Used by the Special Operations Command's units as well as by conventional troops stationed in French Guiana.
Remington Model 870	United States	Pump-action shotgun	12-gauge		Used by conventional troops stationed in French Guiana.

=== Grenade launchers ===
Name	Origin	Type	Caliber	Photo	Notes
Heckler & Koch AG36	Germany	Grenade launcher	40mm grenade		In service in limited numbers since 2014; 10,767 units ordered in September 2016.
Heckler & Koch 269 F	Germany	Grenade launcher	40mm grenade		The HK269 is the result of the development of the 40mm x 46 low velocity M320 GLM with the ability to open the barrel to the left or right. It can be used under the HK416 F or as a stand-alone weapon.
Milkor MGL	South Africa South Africa	Grenade launcher	40mm grenade		Used by the Special Operations Command's units
Heckler & Koch GMG	Germany	Grenade machine gun	40mm grenade		Used by the Special Operations Command's units

=== Anti-tank weapons ===
Name	Origin	Type	Caliber	Photo	Notes
AT4 CS	Sweden	Recoilless anti-tank weapon	84mm		2 AT4 CS per infantry squad; The AT4 CS equips each of the grenadiers-voltigeurs of the 300 Meter fireteam. Work in progress concerns the acquisition of a night firing capability by 2020.; The F2 standard will replace both the Eryx and the AT4 CS (F1) in French service. Delivery expected to begin in 2022.
MILAN	France; West Germany	Anti-tank guided missile	115mm		0; Replaced by the Akeron MP; Unknown number of firing posts and missiles donated to Ukraine in 2022
Eryx	France	Anti-tank guided missile	136mm		310; 700 firing posts and 12,000 missiles delivered; 310 Launchers in service December 2025 to be replaced by the Akeron MP and by the AT4 F2
NLAW	Sweden; United Kingdom	Anti-tank guided missile	150mm		On order. Delivery 2026-2030. Option for more in the future.
FGM-148 Javelin	United States	Fire-and-forget Anti-tank guided missile	127mm		0; 76 launchers and 260 missiles delivered in 2011; Removed from the inventory in 2021 and mothballed pending a decision by the DGA; Some or all were donated to Ukraine in 2022; Replaced by the Akeron MP
Akeron MP	France	Fifth generation anti-tank guided missile	140mm		387; Successor of the MILAN and US-made Javelin systems in French service; 400 firing posts and 2,850 missiles have been ordered as of 2017; First units delivered in 2017; 387 Launchers in service December 2025

== Vehicles ==
=== Armoured vehicles ===
Name	Origin	Type	Number	Photo	Notes
Tanks
Leclerc	France	Main battle tank	225 (inc XLR)		Total - 406 (222 In service & 184 In storage).; 200 will be upgraded to the Leclerc XLR.
Leclerc XLR	France	Main battle tank	21		Total 200 Leclercs will be upgraded to the XLR version.
Engineering / Recovery and repair
Engin Blindé du Génie	France	Armoured engineering vehicle	38		Capable of launching demolition grenades for destroying casemates, dropping 20 anti-tank mines, equipped with a hydraulic winch, a straight shovel and a log grapple.
SDZ - Zone mine clearance system	France	Chaser remotely operated / Mine clearance vehicle	?		System for opening mined routes; 10 ordered and delivered from 2017
Leclerc DCL	France	Armoured recovery vehicle	26		26 in service December 2025; They will be upgraded to the XLR-standard
AMX-30D	France	Armoured recovery vehicle	22		First prototype produced and delivered in 1971; First of a pre-series of five vehicles delivered in 1973 and 100 units ordered the same year, with production beginning in 1975; 22 still in service as of December 2025
Wheeled armoured fighting vehicles
VBCI	France	VCI: Armoured infantry fighting vehicle; VPC: Armoured command vehicle; 32T: Heavier variant of the VCI and VPC	627		The full delivery of the 520 VCI and 110 VPC ordered (including their respective 32T variants) was fulfilled in 2018; 627 units in service as of December 2025
VAB	France	VAB VTT: Armoured personnel carrier; VAB PC: Armoured command vehicle; VAB Mephisto: Armoured self-propelled anti-tank missile system; VAB 2R2M: Armoured 120mm self-propelled mortar; VAB Bromure: Electronic warfare vehicle; VAB RASIT: Armoured reconnaissance vehicle; VAB SAN: Armoured medical evacuation vehicle; VAB RECO NBC: CBRN reconnaissance vehicle; Many other variants	ε1474		4,000 units delivered to the French Armed Forces in nearly 30 variants and sub-variants since the VAB's introduction; Will be gradually replaced by the VBMR Griffon and VBMR-L Serval (from 2018 and 2022 onwards respectively); 2557 (including the 57 VAB OBS variant mentioned in the "Artillery and air defense" section) in active service with the French army as of 2021; A 'significant' amount of VAB donated to Ukraine since 2022
VBMR Griffon	France	VTT: Armoured personnel carrier; EPC/VOA: Armoured command and artillery observation vehicle; MEPAC: Armoured mortar carrier; Génie: Armoured combat engineering vehicle; Ambulance/Santé: Armoured medical evacuation vehicle; NRBC: Armoured CBRN defense vehicle	886		Successor of the VAB; 1,872 units on order under the Scorpion program; 936 units to be delivered by 2025; Full delivery by 2030; 886 units delivered as of 31 december 2025
VBMR-L Serval	France	VPB: Armoured personnel carrier; SA2R: Armoured ISTAR vehicle; NCT: Armoured communications vehicle; Guerre Électronique: Electronic warfare vehicle	414		Will primarily equip the 11th Airborne Brigade and the 27th Mountain Infantry Brigade.; 978 units are on order under the Scorpion program. The contract was awarded in February 2018 and included funding for 489 vehicles to be delivered by 2025, reaching the planned 978 by 2030.; 1,060 additional Serval VLTP P segment haut (multi-purpose light tactical vehicles) will be purchased by 2033.; 414 units delivered as of December 2025
AMX 10 RC	France	Armoured reconnaissance vehicle Wheeled tank destroyer Light tank	181		Will be gradually replaced by the EBRC Jaguar from 2021 onwards; 40 were given to Ukraine in March 2023.
EBRC Jaguar	France	Armoured reconnaissance vehicle	128		Successor of the AMX 10 RC, ERC 90 Sagaie and VAB Mephisto; 300 units were ordered under the Scorpion program and will be delivered from 2021 onwards; 91 delivered as of March 2025
EBRC Kiosque	France	EBRC Jaguar Driver Training Vehicle	2 (2023)		Ordered and delivered from 2022; Used for ABC training and practice on EBRC Jaguar
Buffalo MRAP	United States	Mine-Resistant Ambush Protected vehicle	?		Armored vehicle equipped with a remote manipulator arm; 5 units were ordered for the Afghanistan war.; Replaced by the Nexter Aravis, a French developed MRAP, no longer in inventory according to 2025 figures
Nexter Aravis	France; Germany	Infantry mobility vehicle / Mine-Resistant Ambush Protected	12		The order for 15 Aravis vehicles was placed by the Délégation Générale pour l'Armement in April 2009 for use by the French Army.; 11 units were used in the Afghanistan war for reconnaissance, route clearance and as an escort vehicle for engineer units.
VBL	France	Armoured car	1373		730 of them are being upgraded to the Ultima-standard with a new engine, new transmission, strengthened suspension and additional armour; Will be succeeded by the Véhicule Blindé d’Aide à l’Engagement (VBAE)
PVP	France	Armoured car	1,102		
Tracked articulated vehicles
Véhicule à Haute Mobilité (VHM) Véhicule Articulé Chenillé (VAC) VAC NewGen or VAC 270	Sweden / United KingdomFrance	Armoured personnel carrier	52		The Véhicule à Haute Mobilité (High Mobility Vehicle) or VHM is the term used within the French Army to designate the Bandvagn 210 Mk II, which is derived from the Bv 206. It is a tracked, armoured, articulated, amphibious and air-transportable vehicle weighing 13 tons. First ordered in December 2009, there are 53 units in service as of 2017.; The Véhicule Articulé Chenillé (Tracked Articulated Vehicle) or VAC designates the Bv 206 and Bv 206S in French service. 50 VAC (Bv 206) were procured in the 1990s and some were upgraded to the Bv 206S standard for service in Afghanistan. They are being phased out (no longer in service in 2025) and replaced with the VHM since 2011.

=== Artillery and air defence ===
Name	Origin	Variant	Number	Photo	Notes
Self-propelled artillery
CAESAR	France	155 mm wheeled self-propelled howitzer	75		Delivered from 2008 onwards; several units + ordered donated to Ukraine; The CAESAR Nouvelle Génération (CAESAR New Generation) or CAESAR NG is being developed by Nexter. The contract was awarded in February 2022 by the DGA.
CAESAR NG	France	155 mm wheeled self-propelled howitzer	0		Updated version of the Caesar will be heavier, more mobile (better engine) and better protected.; Will be delivered from 2026 onwards; 33 units planned to be in service as of June 2026, 109 in June 2030
Artillery observation
VAB VOA	France	Armoured artillery observation vehicle	0		Replaced by the EPC/VOA variant of the VBMR Griffon and VO variant of the VBMR-L_Serval
Griffon VOA & Serval OA	France	Armoured artillery observation vehicle	64		
Rocket artillery
LRU MLRS	United States; France	227mm self-propelled multiple rocket launcher	9		57 M270 MLRS (called "Lance-Roquettes Multiple" or "LRM" in French service) were delivered in the early 1990s.; 55 in service in 2007; All were withdrawn from service by France in accordance with the 2008 Convention on Cluster Munitions.; In 2014, 13 of those LRM were converted into the "Lance-Roquettes Unitaire" (LRU), which is a European variant of the upgraded M270A1. 9 remain in active service.; 2 were given to Ukraine.
Mortars
MO 120 RT F1	France	120 mm mortar	174		174 in service as of December 2025
Griffon MEPAC & Serval 120 mm Mortar Carrier	France	120mm Mortar Carrier	39		
Mo 81 LLR F1	France	81 mm mortar	?		2 units per infantry company
M6 mortar	Austria	60 mm light mortar	?		Selected in 2020 as the new 60 mm mortar; Contract awarded on 21 June that year; 120 M6 C-640 Mk1 mortars, 6,500 HE shells, 2,000 ILL-VIS shells, 2,300 ILL-IR shells, 2,500 smoke shells, 4,700 training shells, as well as 50 booster bipods and associated aiming devices to be delivered over the 45-month duration of the contract
LGI Mle F1	France	Mortar, 51mm grenade			1 LGI per infantry squad; Man-portable, easily carried and operated by a single soldier, it equips one of the two grenadiers-voltigeurs of the 600 Meter fireteam in an infantry squad; Ammunition include high explosive projectiles for personnel neutralization and material destruction as well as smoke, blinding and flare bombs; Will be succeeded by the upcoming Fly-K Mk2 LGI developed by Cathyor.
Air defence
Mistral	France	Short-range surface-to-air missile system	234		additional systems on order; Unknown number of Mistral MANPADS donated to Ukraine in 2022
NEROD F5-5	France	Portable anti-drone weapon	Unknown		The NEROD F5 is a microwave jammer capable of disrupting and neutralizing all communication protocols used by drones. It neutralizes: the usual or improvised mini and micro drones by acting simultaneously on 4 remote control frequencies among 5 available; the satellite navigation system of the targeted drone.

=== Engineering ===
Name	Origin	Variant	Number	Photo	Notes
Unarmoured engineering vehicles
TNA	France	Airborne leveling tractor	6		
MFRD	France	Rapid destruction drilling truck	122		
EGAME	France	Bulldozer	35		
MPG	France	Loader	?		
UNAC 20TRR	France	Road–rail excavator	2		
Liebherr LTM 1050–3.1	Germany	Mobile crane	50		
SOUVIM	South Africa	Interim Vehicle Mounted Mine Detector	8		
Scania P340	Sweden	Dump truck	161		
Caterpillar D6	United States	Bulldozer	40		
EGRAP	United Kingdom	Backhoe loader	92		
Bridging vehicles/Military Ferries
EFA	France	Ferry/Mobile bridge	20		
PFM	France	Mobile bridge	70 (2013)		
SPRAT	France	Modular assault bridge	10		
Vedette de pontage F2	France	Bridging speedboat	8		
Robots
MINIROGEN (ECA COBRA MK2)	France	Multi-function military robot	30		Used for mine clearing, chemical detection and reconnaissance; 30 ordered; Delivery began in 2012
ECA UGV IGUANA	France	Mine clearing robot	15		43 units to be delivered until 2024
iRobot Packbot 510	United States	Mine clearing robot	15		

=== Logistics ===
Name	Origin	Variant	Number	Photo	Notes
TRM 10000	France	Truck	?		1.373 TRM 2000 + TRM 10000 (including CLD) in service
TRM 700–100	France	Truck	?		
TRM 2000	France	Truck	?		
Renault GBC 180	France	Truck	5,013		
Renault Kerax	France	Truck	420		
Porteur polyvalent terrestre (PPT)	France; Italy	PPLOG NP: Logistic vehicle 687; PPLD: Recovery vehicle			1600 units on order
Véhicule porte conteneur maritime (VPCM)	France; United Kingdom	8x8 container carrier	12		
Tanker trucks
Camion citerne polyvalent (CCP10)	France; Sweden	6x6 fuel tanker truck		sans_cadre sans_cadre	Fabriqués par Scania
Camion Ravitailleur Pétrolier de l’Avant à Capacité Étendue (CaRaPACE)	France; Sweden	Armoured fuel tanker truck	34	gauche	
Recovery vehicles
Camion lourd de dépannage routier (CLDR)	France	8x4 recovery vehicle	30		

=== Unarmoured vehicles ===
Name	Origin	Variant	Number	Photo	Notes
Unarmoured vehicles
RIDER (Fardier)	France	Light utility vehicle		Unac-Fardier-The-airdroppable-RIDER	300 units ordered, alongside 172 trailers; 8 RIDER delivered as of December 2022
VLRA	France	Light utility vehicle			The VLRA "Pamela" configuration (pictured) is a mobile platform equipped with a Mistral firing station.
Panhard VPS	France	Light utility vehicle	51		Delivered between 2006 and 2008; Used by the Special Operation Command's units; Will be replaced by 241 Véhicules Légers des Forces Spéciales (VLFS) from 2020 onwards
Arquus AREG VLFS	France	Light utility vehicle			Successor of the Panhard VPS.
Renault Kangoo	France	Light utility vehicle	460		Used by counter-terrorism units.
VMA	France	Airport crash tender			Used by the French Army Light Aviation.
Peugeot P4	Germany; France	Light utility vehicle	?		MB G-Class chassis with French engine; 13,500 units delivered between 1982 and 1992; 600 withdrawn from service every year; Being replaced by VT4.
T4 VLTP NP	Japan; France	Light utility vehicle	500		Based on the five-door VDJ76 Toyota Land Cruisers procured from French coach builders Technamm.; Delivery of 500 units until the end of May 2018
Arquus Trapper VT4	France; United States	Light utility vehicle	3949		VLTP-NP based on the Ford Everest; Militarized by ACMAT and sold under the Arquus brand; 4380 units planned; Trapper carries a 1-ton payload; Trigger variant, with a slightly larger interior and carrying a 1.3 ton payload, being developed by ACMAT
Ford Ranger	United States	Light utility vehicle	1,000	sans cadre	Introduced as an urgent operational requirement to replace the Peugeot P4.
Land Rover Defender	United Kingdom	Light utility vehicle	550		
Quad Polaris	United States	All-terrain vehicle	348		Used by French special forces; 300 Polaris Sportsman 700; 48 Polaris MV 850

== Aircraft ==
Aircraft	Origin	Type	Quantity	Photo	Notes
Fixed-wing aircraft
Pilatus PC-6	Switzerland	Transport and airdrop	5		
SOCATA TBM 700	France	VIP transport and utility	9		
Helicopters
Eurocopter Tiger HAP/HAD	Europe	Attack helicopter	67		67 in service
NHIndustries NH90	Europe	Utility helicopter	63		The total of 63 NH90 Tactical Transport Helicopter (TTH) Standard 1 helicopters delivered in February 2025. Another 18 NH90 TTH Standard 2 helicopters on order.
Aérospatiale Puma	France	Utility helicopter	15		15 in service as of December 2025; Being replaced by the NH90
Eurocopter Cougar	France	Utility helicopter	24		24 in service as of December 2025; Being replaced by the NH90
Eurocopter Caracal	France	CSAR/SOF helicopter	8		8 in service as of December 2025
Aérospatiale Gazelle	France	Reconnaissance helicopter	80		80 in service as of December 2025
Eurocopter Fennec	France	Light surveillance helicopter	18		18 in service as of December 2025
Colibri	Europe	Training helicopter	36		36 in service as of 2023
UAVs
Safran Patroller	France	ISTAR	1		5 systems (28 drones) planned.; 1 system (5 drones) delivered as of December 2023; Entering service operational service in 2024
EADS DRAC	France	Reconnaissance	38		38 systems in service in 2017; Will be replaced by the Thales Spy'Ranger from 2019
Thales Spy'Ranger	France	Reconnaissance	70		70 systems (210 drones) in service as of 2023
ECA IT180 DroGen	France	Reconnaissance	12		6 systems (consisting of 2 drones each) in service as of 2021
Novadem NX70 and Parrot ANAFI drones	France	Micro Reconnaissance drone	~2000		
Black Hornet Nano 3	Norway	Nano Reconnaissance drone	383		Some were given to allies

== Future equipment ==
Name	Origin	Type	Photo	Notes
Mlrs Thundart	Thales France	modular mlrs		modular Mlrs presented at Eurosatory 2026. Will be test in Ukraine
CAPINT tank ?	KNDS France	tank		French government very interested
CAESAR Mk.2	Nexter Systems	Howitzer		With more protection and mobility than the first version. 109 will be acquire
Missile Balistique Tactique BS-1000/2500	Ariane Group	balistic missile		range of 1000 and 2500 km respectively. Part of European ELSA initiative
Aquila interceptor	MBDA France	anti-ballistic and anti-hypersonic missile with long range		Part of European Hydis initiative to intercept Hypersonic missiles
