= Two-inch mortar =

Ordnance SBML two-inch mortar
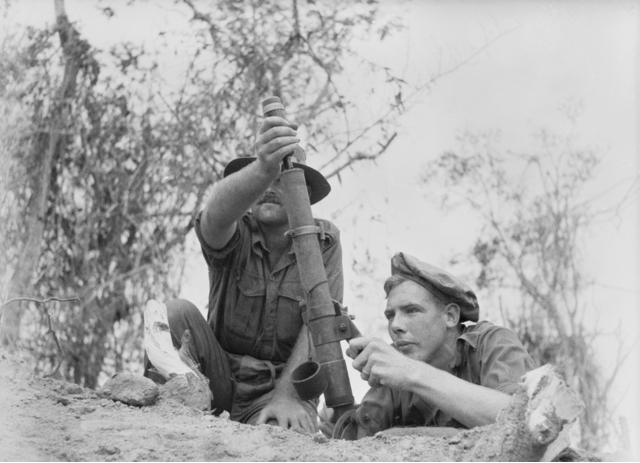
- Australian infantrymen using a 2-inch (51 mm) mortar in New Guinea in 1945 (AWM 094355)
- Type: Light mortar
- Place of origin: United Kingdom

Service history
- Used by: British Commonwealth armies other users
- Wars: World War II; Korean War; Sino-Indian War; Biafran War

Production history
- Designed: 1937
- Variants: Mark 8 "airborne"

Specifications
- Mass: 10 1/2 lb (4.8 kg)
- Length: 21 in (53 cm)
- Crew: Two
- Shell: High explosive: 2 lb 2 oz (960 g). Smoke: 2 pounds (910 g); Illuminating: 1 lb 5 oz (600 g)
- Calibre: 2 in (51 mm)
- Action: Trip
- Elevation: 45-90°
- Rate of fire: 8 rounds per minute
- Effective firing range: 500 yd (460 m)

The Ordnance SBML two-inch mortar, or more commonly, just "two-inch mortar", was a British mortar issued to the British Army and the Commonwealth armies, that saw use during the Second World War and later.

It was more portable than larger mortars, and had greater range and firepower than rifle grenades. Its main purpose was to produce smoke for cover and through high trajectory and HE shell, engage targets "immune to small arms fire".

== Design ==
The two-inch mortar was one of a number of small mortars brought into service by European nations between the two World Wars.

Due to its small size, and for simplicity, the mortar had no forward strut or bipod like larger designs needed. The barrel was held at the correct angle by one soldier while the other loaded and fired the round. The original design had a large base plate and sights for aiming which used spirit levels. As the design matured, the baseplate became smaller and the sights were omitted; aiming was by eye and relied on the firer's judgment and experience. With such a short barrel, the typical firing method where the bomb was dropped down the tube and a pin in the base of the barrel struck the detonator in the tail of the bomb would not work, so firing was by a small trigger mechanism at the breech.

The bombs were cylindrical with a (perforated) four finned tail. For the HE projectile an impact fuze was fitted in the nose of the bomb.

Postwar, the two-inch mortar was kept in service to fire smoke and illuminating rounds. It was replaced by the Royal Ordnance 51 mm infantry mortar in the late 1980s.

Specifications

- Calibre: 2 inches (50.8 mm)
- Length: 21 inches (53 cm)
- Weight: 10 1/2 pounds (4.8 kg)
- Firing mechanism: Trip (small trigger)
- Elevation: 45-90°
- Range: 500 yards (460 m)
- Rate of fire: Eight rounds per minute

== Variants ==
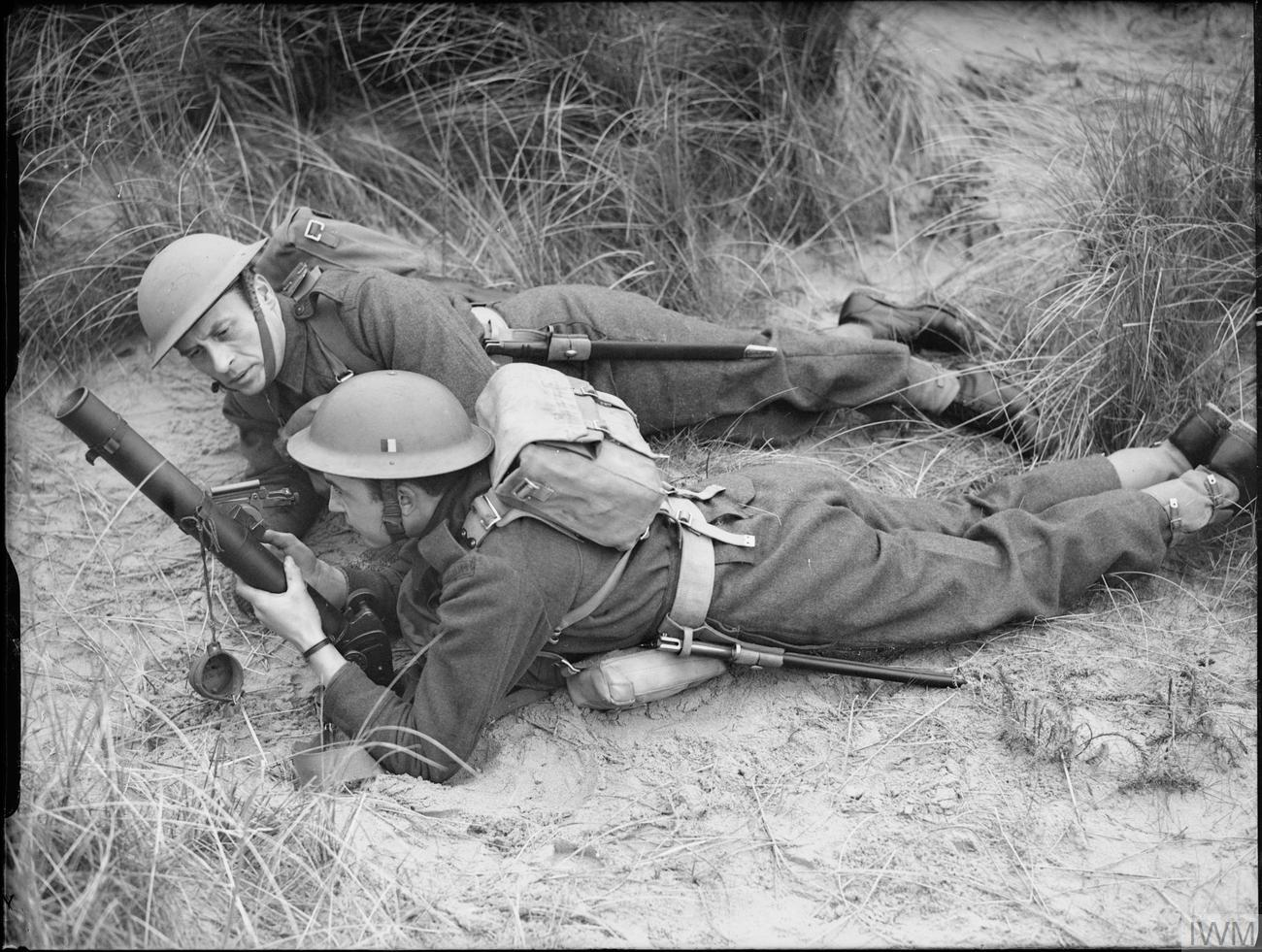
Free Belgian Forces fire a two-inch mortar during a training exercise in Wales, 1941

- Mk I - squad-level mortar introduced in 1918 and declared obsolete in 1919.
- Mk II - the first model introduced in 1938 with a large baseplate.
- Mk II* - the 1938 version intended for use with the Universal Carrier
- Mk II** - a second version for use with the Universal Carrier
- Mk II*** - version for use by infantry at platoon level and fitted with a large baseplate
- Mk III - version used as a smoke bomb launcher for tanks It was built into the turret and could fire smoke shells from 20 to 120 yd (18 to 110 m) away. The range was varied by using a gas regulator to adjust the escaping propellant gases. It was aimed and fired by using a pistol grip at the back that would activate the firing pin when the trigger was pulled.
- Mk IV - limited production run and did not enter service
- Mk V - not manufactured
- Mk VI - not manufactured
- Mk VII - for use on Universal Carriers
- Mk VII* - for use by airborne forces, having a shorter barrel - 14 inches (360 mm) - and the baseplate replaced with a spade-like plate
- Mk VII** - infantry use with long barrel and spade-like baseplate
- Mk VIIA - Indian Army model
- Mk VIII - another short-barrelled version for the airborne forces

== Ammunition types ==
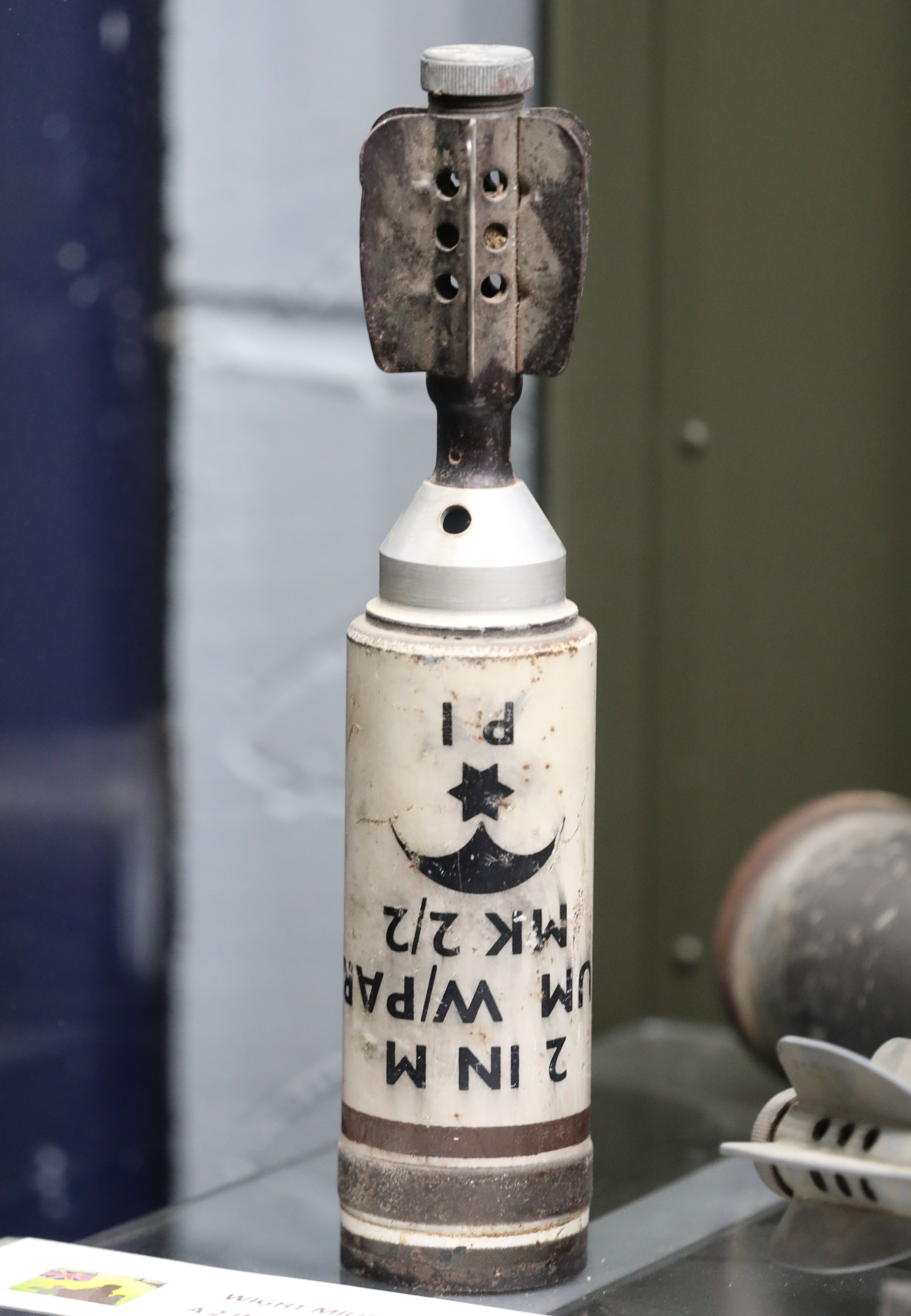
Parachute illumination round

- High explosive (HE): 2.25 lb (1.02 kg) - olive drab body, red band
- White phosphorus smoke (WP Smk): 2.25 lb (1.02 kg) - dark green body
- Titanium tetrachloride smoke (FM Smk): 2 lb (0.91 kg) - dark green body
- Illumination (Ill): 1 lb (0.45 kg) - drab khaki (light OD) body
- Signal multi-star (Sig): 1 lb (0.45 kg) - white body and 2 lb (0.91 kg)) - grey body. The multi-star was available in white, red, green, and mixed red-green.

Ammunition was packed one 51 mm-bomb per tube, three conjoined tubes per pack (three bombs), two packs (six bombs) to a fibre container, and three fibre containers to a steel box (18 bombs total).

== Modern variants ==
India's Ordnance Factory Board's 51mm E1 mortar is an enhanced version of the two-inch British mortar of World War II; it is still in production and service in India.

Specifications

- Calibre: 51.25mm (2 in)
- Weight: 4.88 kg
- Range: 200-850m
- Rate of fire:
  - normal: eight rounds per minute
  - high: 12 rounds per minute
- Bomb weight:
  - High explosive: 950g (800m range)

== Users ==
- Australia
- Belgium
- Canada
- France
- India
  - United Liberation Front of Assam
  - Naxalites
- Jamaica
- Jordan
- Luxembourg
- Myanmar
  - Myanmar Army : Inherited from British-Burma Army and also bought from India. Main Light mortar used until 1990s.
- Nepal
  - People's Liberation Army, Nepal
- New Zealand
- Nigeria
  - Biafra
- Norway: Free Norwegian forces
- Poland: Polish Armed Forces in the West
- South Africa
- United Kingdom
- United States The Mk.III (renamed the M3 mortar) was used by the US Army on the M4 Sherman from late 1943 to early of 1945. The vehicle's combat load was 18 smoke shells for M4 tanks with the 75 or 76 mm cannon to 12 shells for M4 assault tanks with the 105 mm howitzer.

== See also ==
Similar World War 2-era weapons:

- 37 mm spade mortar
- 5 cm Granatwerfer 36
- Lance Grenades de 50 mm modèle 37
- Type 89 grenade discharger

== Bibliography ==
- Bishop, Chris, ed. (1998). "Ordnance, ML 2-inch Mortar". The Encyclopedia of Weapons of World War II. New York: Orbis Publishing Ltd. p. 193. ISBN 978-0-7607-1022-7.
- Gates, Scott; Roy, Kaushik (2014). Unconventional Warfare in South Asia: Shadow Warriors and Counterinsurgency (1st ed.). Routledge. ISBN 9781138252981.
- Norris, John (11 December 2002). Infantry Mortars of World War II. New Vanguard 54. Osprey Publishing. ISBN 9781841764146.
