= Bumbar =

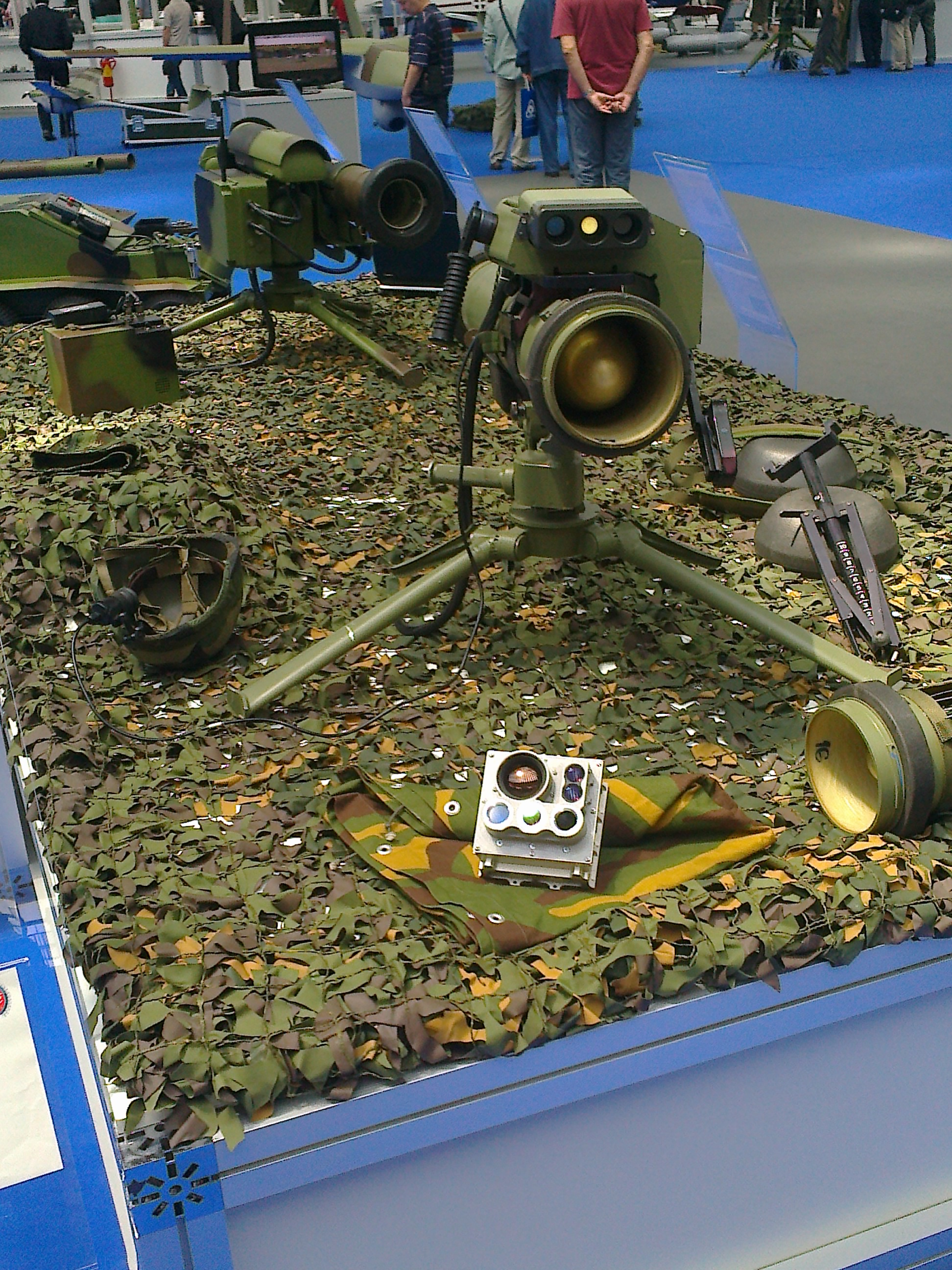
- Type: Anti-tank missile
- Place of origin: Serbia

Production history
- Designer: Military Technical Institute
- Designed: 2005
- Manufacturer: Krušik
- No. built: 3 prototypes built

Specifications
- Mass: Missile: 10kg Launch tube: 2 kg Firing post: 4 kg Tripod: 2 kg Total: 18 kg
- Length: 0.9 m (35 in)
- Diameter: 136 mm (5.4 in)
- Warhead: tandem, shaped charge
- Operational range: 60 m-600 m (1000 m under development)
- Maximum speed: 18 m/s at launch - 245 m/s at maximum
- Guidance system: SACLOS wire-guided
- Launch platform: Individual, Vehicle

The Bumbar (from Serbian: бумбар, lit. 'bumblebee') is a Serbian short-range portable anti-tank missile system.

== Description ==
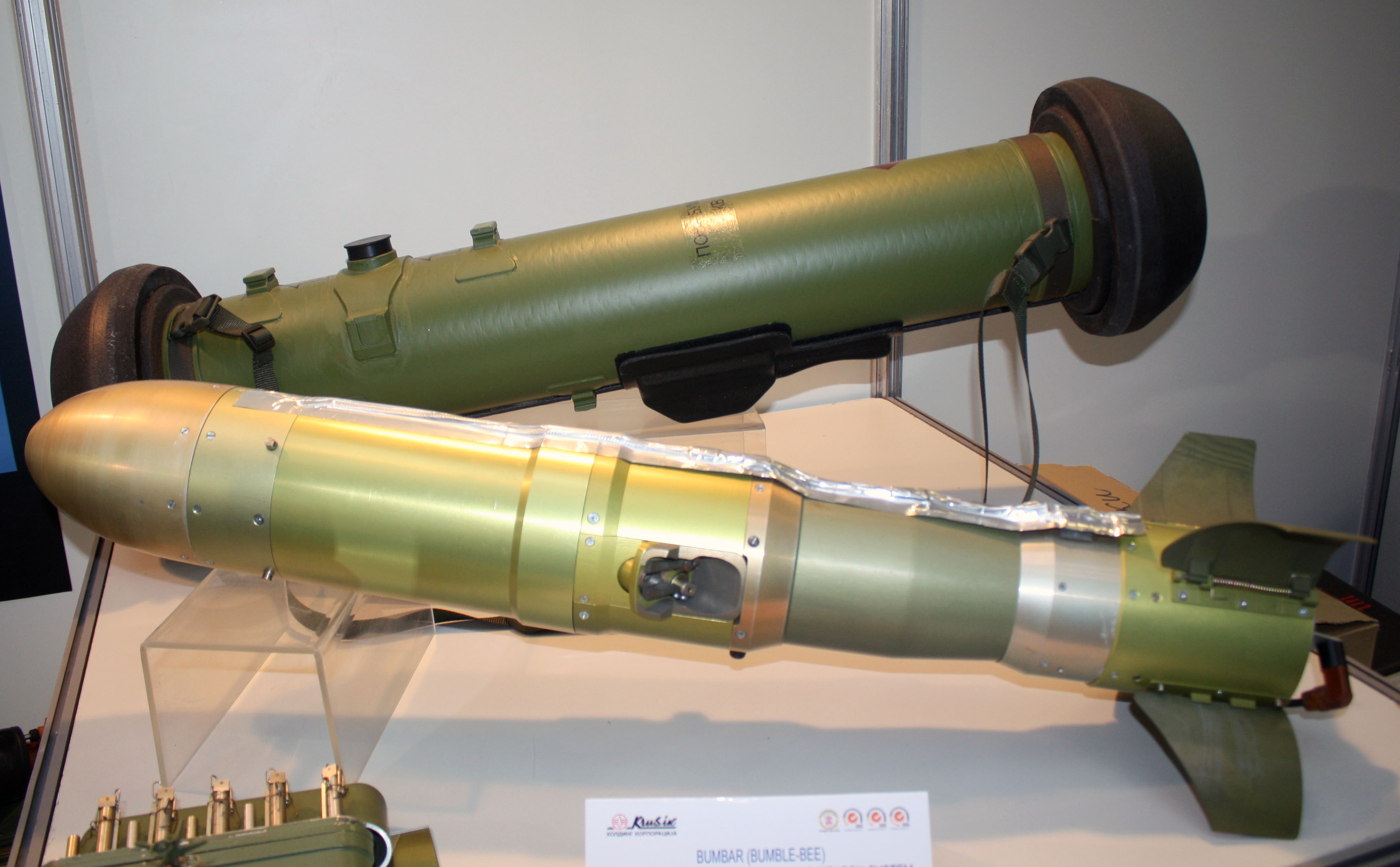
Bumbar anti-tank missile exterior.

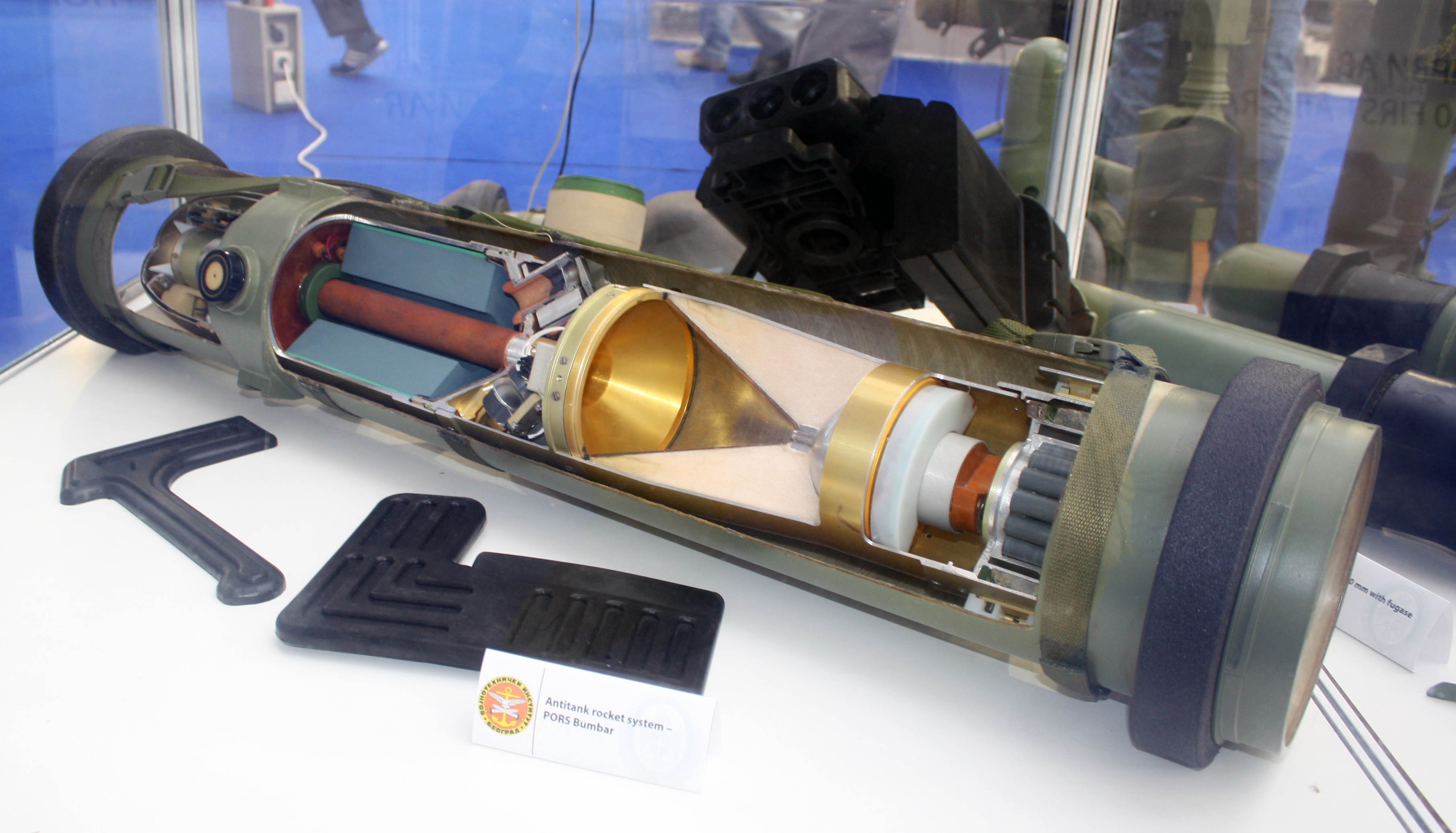
Cut away photo of the Bumbar anti-tank missile.

The Bumbar is a wire-guided, man-portable, short-ranged missile system for use against ground targets. The missile has a soft launch capability - the main motor firing after the missile has left the launcher, which allows for the missile to be fired from confined spaces, which is a necessity in urban warfare. During its flight, the rocket is maneuvered by unique system of thrust vectoring. The missile is propelled by two main rocket motor exhaust vanes located at mid body. As the missile rotates the launch units send signals commanding the correction by one of the two vanes to move against the missile motors thrust. For example, if the missile has to move to the left, the right thrust vector vane will actuate at the correct time. It is protected against electronic countermeasures through the "use of CCD matrix sensors, fast image-processing computer and robust tracer recognition algorithm."

Its general design is similar to the French/Canadian Eryx MBDA anti-tank missile and has similar specifications. However MBDA has never supplied Serbia or the former Yugoslavia with technical or engineering information regarding the Eryx.

=== General information ===
- Time of flight to target at 600 m: 4.6 s
- Warhead penetration: over 1000 mm RHA behind ERA
- Range: up to 600 m
- Weapon length in travelling position: 1164 mm
- Capable of firing from confined spaces
- Night firing capability
- Mass of missile in transporting/launching tube: 14 kg
- Secondary warhead caliber: 55 mm
- LC axis superelevation angle: 10°
