= M-4 commando mortar =

The M-4 commando mortar, also known as a patrol mortar, is a lightweight 60 mm commando mortar manufactured by Denel Land Systems.

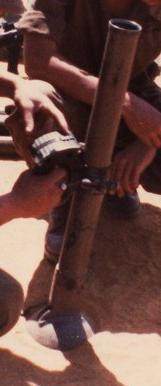
An instructor pointing out the use of the range table

== Description ==
As with other mortars of this type it is intended for rapid use over short ranges as a fire support weapon. It has a lanyard operated trigger mechanism in the breech which allows it to be carried loaded with a bomb, unlike other mortars that have fixed firing pins. The lack of a bipod means it is not as accurate as a conventional mortar and is unsuitable for sustained fire use. The sighting system incorporated in the handle consists of a pair of curved spirit levels one to indicate that it upright in the lateral plane and the other indicates the range with a charge table. Beta lights illuminate the sight for night use.

== Ammunition ==
It uses the M-61 series of bombs in high explosive, smoke, illumination and practice versions.

== Variants ==
- M4: pulling a lanyard releases the firing mechanism
- M4 Mk 1: equipped with a fixed firing pin
- M4L3: version with simplified baseplate and sight, range is shorter (1,200 m).

== Users ==
- Colombia - Colombian Army
- Mexico: M4L3
- South Africa - South African Army

=== Former users ===
- Rhodesia – Rhodesian Army

== Specifications ==
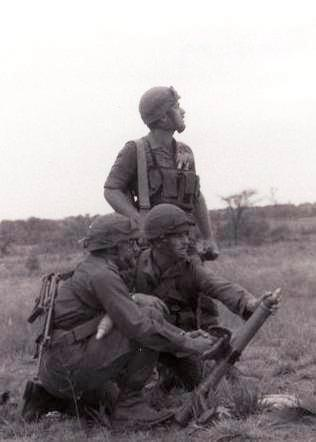
An M-4 commando mortar used by South African paratroops

- Type: Muzzle loading mortar
- Calibre: 60 mm
- Mass: Total 7.2 kg - barrel 3.2 kg - breech 0.9 kg - baseplate 1.9 kg - sight/handle - 1.1 kg
- Barrel length: 650 mm
- Traverse: 300 mil
- Elevation: 710 to 1510 mil
- Muzzle velocity: 171 m/s
- Range: 100 m minimum - 2100 m maximum
