= Hirtenberger M6C-210 =

Hirtenberger M6C-210 Commando
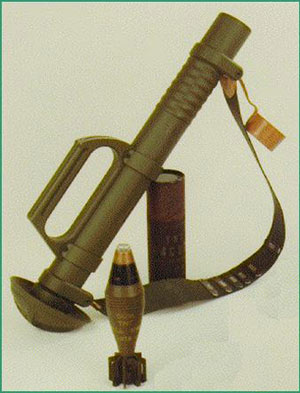
- Type: Light mortar
- Place of origin: Austria

Service history
- Used by: Austria; Italy; Albania; Switzerland; Greece; Bulgaria; Georgia; Japan
- Wars: Afghanistan War

Specifications
- Mass: 5.1 kg (11 lb)
- Barrel length: 81.5 cm (2 ft 8 in)
- Calibre: 60 mm (2.4 in)
- Rate of fire: 15–30 rounds per minute
- Effective firing range: 2,000 m (2,200 yd)

The Hirtenberger M6C-210 is a light mortar with smoothbore barrel, part of the M6 mortar range designed by Hirtenberger Defense Systems of Austria.

This mortar is equipped with two aiming devices and is characterized by high mobility, which should meet the needs of fire during rapid deployment, forward troops or small units such as those engaged in special operations. All common types of mortar bombs calibre 60mm can be fired from this mortar.

Lacking the support legs found on mortar intended for use from fixed emplacements, the M6C-series mortars are operated by resting the base plate on the ground while a soldier supports the tube near the muzzle. A single soldier can operate this mortar with little special training, making it a squad-level infantry weapon, trading accuracy for portability.

The 60mm mortar has a reach of over 2,000 m (2,200 yd), depending on the shell weight and propellant charge being used.

== See also ==
- List of infantry mortars
- Commando mortar
