= 37 mm marsh mortar =

Iranian commando mortar

The 37 mm marsh mortar was a compact commando mortar developed by the Iranian Army during the Iran–Iraq War. It is very similar in concept to the World War II Soviet 37 mm spade mortar. Though not officially designated as marsh mortar, the term is used by academics in describing this mortar.

Though small for a mortar, 37 mm was the maximum shell size for which recoil did not drive the mortar into the soft ground.
