= L9A1 51 mm light mortar =

Man-portable platoon-level mortar

The L10A1 51 mm light mortar was a man-portable platoon-level mortar used by the British Army from 1986 to 2007.

The 51 mm mortar replaced the World War II-vintage 2-inch mortar in the late 1980s. It was due to be phased out by the use of the 40 mm L17A2 underslung grenade launcher (UGL) mounted on the L85A2 service rifle; however, operational experience has led to the decision to replace it with a 60 mm mortar. The Hirtenberger AG M6-895 60 mm mortar was procured in 2007 as an Urgent Operational Requirement (UOR) to replace the current 51 mm mortar on current operations.

== Design ==
Ammunition for the 51 mm mortar has a small, ring-pull safety pin on the side of the nose-fuze. The fuze remains unarmed until the pin is withdrawn. Therefore, the safety pin must always be removed and discarded before a mortar shell is fired. A short-range insert device allows the weapon to be used in a direct fire mode. Smoke, illuminating and high-explosive bombs are available.

== Specifications ==
- Calibre: 51.25 mm (2.02 in)
- Weight: 6.275 kg (13 lb 13.3 oz) complete
- Length of barrel: 700 mm (28 in)
- Range: 750 m (820 yd)
- Rapid rate of fire: eight rounds per minute
- Bomb weight:
  - Illumination: 800 grams (1.76 lb)
  - Smoke: 900 grams (1.98 lb)
  - High explosive: 920 grams (2.03 lb)

== See also ==
- LGI Mle F1 - French 51mm of similar design and era
