= M6 mortar =

M6-895 60mm mortar
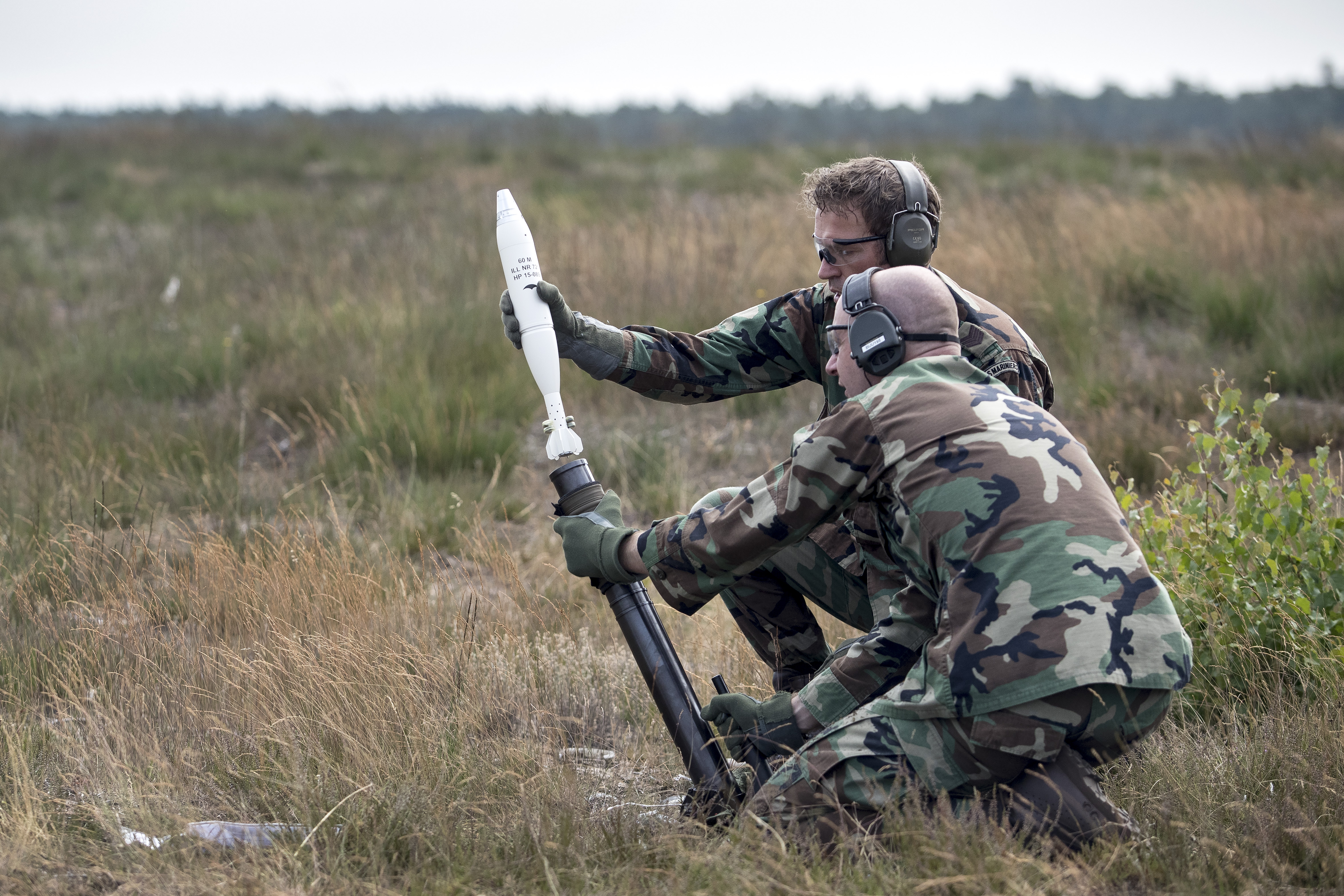
- Dutch Marines fire using the M6 mortar in handheld mode.
- Type: Light mortar
- Place of origin: Austria

Service history
- Used by: See M6 mortar#Users
- Wars: War in Afghanistan (2001-2021)

Production history
- Designer: Hirtenberger
- Manufacturer: Hirtenberger

Specifications
- Mass: Barrel 5.3 kilograms (12 lb); Baseplate 4.8 kilograms (11 lb); Bipod 12 kilograms (26 lb)
- Length: 977 millimetres (3 ft 2.5 in) overall
- Crew: 1
- Caliber: 60 millimetres (2.4 in)
- Action: Muzzle loading
- Rate of fire: 1-12 rpm sustained
- Maximum firing range: 3,800 metres (4,200 yd) (with bipod)
- Feed system: Manual
- Sights: Bubble sight

The M6 Mortar is a 60 mm lightweight infantry mortar made by Hirtenberger AG of Austria.

== Models ==
The mortar is of traditional design with a smoothbore barrel, round baseplate (350 mm diameter), bipod and sight unit and is generally available in three different ballistical barrel lengths, which is usually stated in the model's name:

- 640 mm
- 895 mm
- 1000 mm

Maximum rate of fire with all models is 30 bombs per minute, when loaded by two people alternately, or 12 bombs per minute, when loaded by only one person. Naturally, the maximum ranges differ depending on the ballistic barrel length and the maximal allowed charges.

For all three ballistic barrel lengths a conversion kit is available to fire the mortar in a handheld mode (without bipod and sight) as a commando mortar. The conversion kit contains a small round basepiece, an alternate, slightly bigger rectangular basepiece for soft ground, a carrying belt, an aiming device to set the firing range and a handgrip with a trigger, which has a safety device, so that the commando mortar may be carried with a bomb inside the barrel. Commando versions are called M6C and are portable by one person. With these versions, the operation is restricted to a maximum operating gas pressure of 300 bar. This limits the mortars to using charge 3 as a maximum; however, it is recommended not to go above charge 2 due to precision (therefore the aiming device is for charge 0, charge 1 and charge 2 only).

A modified version for Special Forces is also produced. This version is equipped with a recoil absorbing damping system between the bipod and the barrel. Special Forces versions are called M6H.

Hirtenberger also produces mortar bombs for these mortars. Available Ammunition:

- HE Mk2, high explosive bomb, filled with TNT
- TP-TM Mk2, inert bomb for training purposes, impact signature with life fuze
- SMK-WP Mk2, smoke Bomb, filled with White Phosphorus (fast smoke generation)
- SMK-RP Mk2, smoke bomb, filled with Red Phosphorus (slow smoke generation)
- ILL-VIS Mk2, visible spectrum illumination bomb, 350.000 candela for 35 seconds
- ILL-IR Mk2, infrared spectrum illumination bomb, 35 seconds duration

All ranges stated below are measured with Hirtenbergen 60 mm HE Mk2, but all types of 60 mm mortar bombs may be fired from the mortars.

=== M6C-210T ===
see main article Hirtenberger M6C-210

=== M6C-640T ===
Technical Data:

- Overall length: 825 mm
- Weight: 6.2 kg
- Weight with backpack (2.2 kg) and bag for auxiliaries (2.8 kg): 11.2 kg
- Maximum range with charge 2: 1,384 m
- Maximum range with charge 3: 1,921 m

=== M6(H)-640 ===
Firing with the 640 mm barrel is limited to a maximum operating gas pressure of 550 bar, thus limiting the use to charge 5. The British Army dismounted platoons currently have a M6-640 as part of their weaponry. This however is being reviewed.

Technical Data:

- Bipod weight: 9.3 kg (H: 12.5 kg)
- Baseplate weight: 4.8 kg (H: 4.7 kg)
- Barrel weight: 4.5 kg (H: 4.6 kg)
- Total weight: 18.6 kg (H: 21.8 kg)
- Barrel length: 722 mm (H: 729 mm)
- Maximum range with charge 0: 464 m
- Maximum range with charge 2: 1,384 m
- Maximum range with charge 3: 1,921 m
- Maximum range with charge 5: 2,872 m

=== M6(H)-895 ===
The Hirtenberger M6-895 60 mm mortar was procured as an urgent operational requirement (UOR) for the British Army. It can be fired in both the direct-lay and indirect fire role at a rate of 1–12 rounds a minute and can be operated in the hand held mode. The mortar replaced the L9A1 51 mm Light Mortar due to greater availability of ammunition suppliers for the 60 mm calibre.

In 2016 it was announced that only the Royal Marines Commandos and Parachute Regiment units will use these mortars after the Afghanistan operations. The rest will be stored away for economic reasons.

Technical Data:

- Bipod weight: 9.3 kg (H: 12.5 kg)
- Baseplate weight: 4.8 kg (H: 4.7 kg)
- Barrel weight: 5.4 kg (H: 5.5 kg)
- Total weight: 19.5 kg (H: 22.7 kg)
- Barrel length: 977 mm (H: 984 mm)
- Maximum range with charge 0: 561 m
- Maximum range with charge 2: 1,524 m
- Maximum range with charge 3: 2,100 m
- Maximum range with charge 5: 3,154 m
- Maximum range with charge 6: 3,610 m
- Maximum operating gas pressure: 650 bar

=== M6(H)-1000 ===
Technical Data:

- Bipod weight: 9.3 kg (H: 12.5 kg)
- Baseplate weight: 4.8 kg (H: 4.7 kg)
- Barrel weight: 5.8 kg (H: 5.9 kg)
- Total weight: 19.9 kg (H: 23.1 kg)
- Barrel length: 1082 mm (H: 1089 mm)
- Maximum range with charge 0: 579 m
- Maximum range with charge 2: 1,710 m
- Maximum range with charge 3: 2,401 m
- Maximum range with charge 5: 3,365 m
- Maximum range with charge 6: 3,933 m
- Maximum operating gas pressure: 650 bar

== Users ==
- Malaysia
- Netherlands
- New Zealand
- United Kingdom

== See also ==
- M224 mortar - Comparable 60mm mortar in US service
