= 37 mm spade mortar =

WW2 Soviet infantry mortar

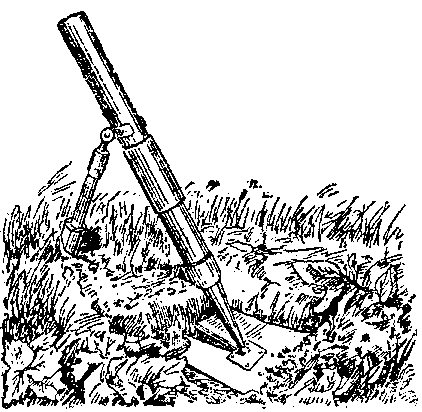
- Type: Infantry mortar
- Place of origin: Soviet Union

Service history
- In service: 1939–1942
- Used by: Soviet Union
- Wars: Winter War; World War II

Specifications
- Mass: 1.5 kg (3 lb 5 oz)
- Barrel length: 52 cm (1 ft 8 in)
- Shell: 0.5 kg (1 lb 2 oz) bomb
- Caliber: 37 mm (1.5 in)
- Breech: muzzle loaded
- Traverse: 1 degrees
- Maximum firing range: 250 m (270 yd)

The 37 mm spade mortar is a Soviet 37 mm light infantry mortar used in the Second World War. The mortar was produced from 1939 until the end of 1941.

== Description ==
The weapon is a dual-purpose device in that it can also be used as a spade. When a leg is removed from the handle, the spade part of the weapon locks into position as a base plate for the mortar. The weapon was apparently intended to serve as a fire support weapon for every infantryman as it was designed to be operated by one man. There was no aiming device and the soldier simply pointed the mortar at its target. The soldier carried 15 rounds of ammunition on a fabric belt for the mortar.

The German Army designated the weapon the 3.7 cm Spatengranatwerfer 161(r), although the true Soviet designation was simply "37 mm mortar" (Russian: 37-мм Миномет). It is likely that the weapon was an attempt to boost the firepower of Soviet rifle units. Although a rifle grenade-launcher (which the Red Army also had) can fire shells of similar weight, they are slower to load and cannot serve as rifles while firing grenades. The spade mortar was used during the Winter War with Finland, where the weapon was found ineffective in the heavy snow. Initially used on the Eastern Front in World War II, the spade mortar fell into disuse after 1942.

During the Iran–Iraq War, the Iranian Army developed a similar device, the 37 mm marsh mortar, for use on marshy ground, as 37 mm was the maximum shell size for which recoil did not drive the mortar into the soft ground.

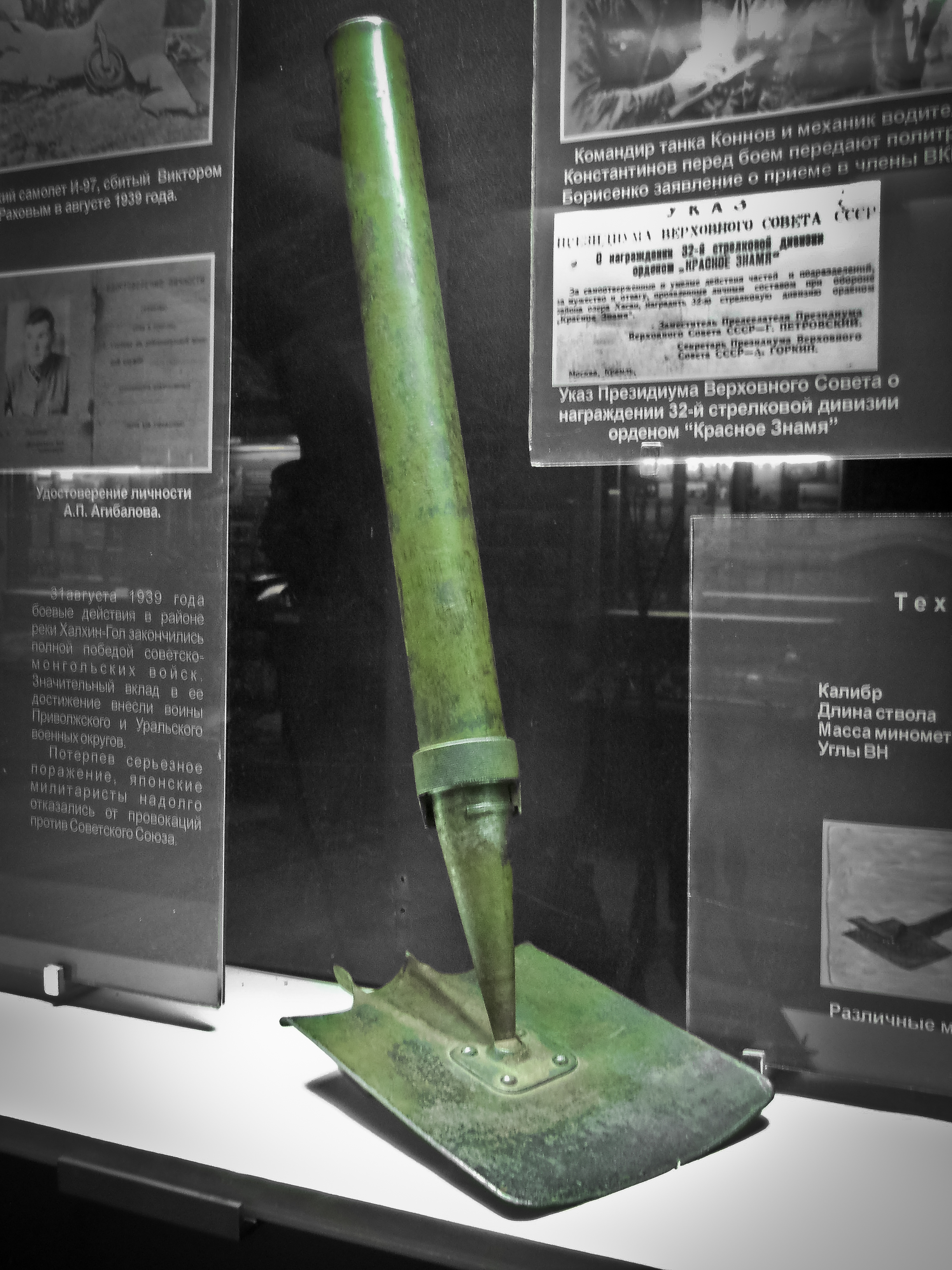
37 mm spade mortar in a museum

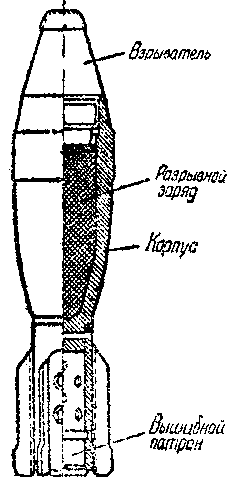
37 mm mortar bomb

== See also ==
- List of Russian weaponry
