= M1938 mortar =

WW2 Soviet infantry mortar

120-PM-38
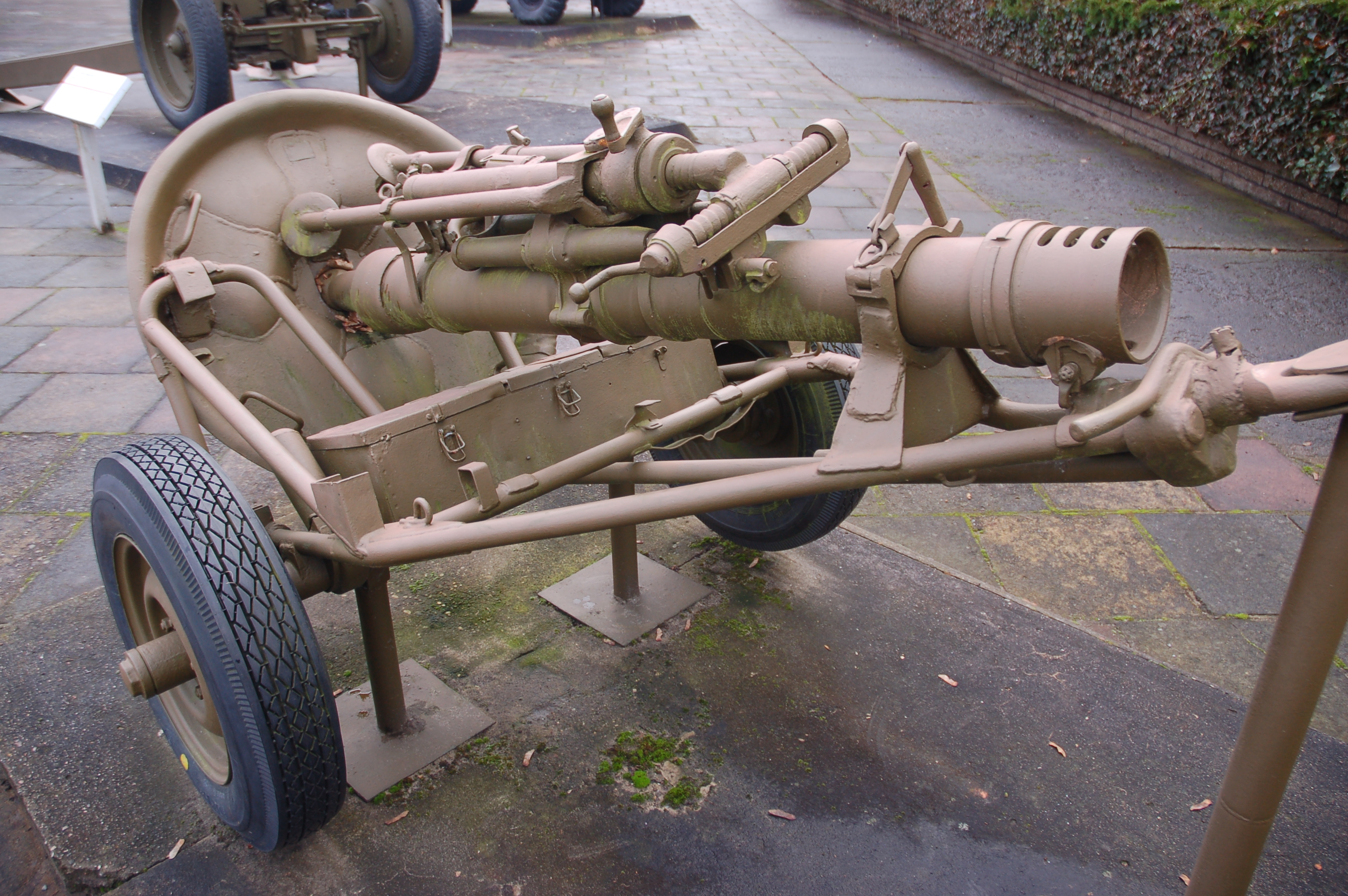
- A 120-PM-38 on its two-wheeled limber
- Type: Mortar
- Place of origin: Soviet Union

Service history
- Wars: World War II; Chinese Civil War; Korean War; First Indochina War; Vietnam War; Suez Crisis; Six-Day War; Lebanese Civil War; Iran–Iraq War

Production history
- Designed: 1938
- Produced: 1939
- Variants: Reșița Model 1942 (Romania)

Specifications
- Mass: travel: 477 kg (1,052 lb) combat: 280 kg (620 lb)
- Barrel length: 1.86 m (6 ft 1 in) L/15.5
- Crew: 6
- Shell: 16 kg (35 lb)
- Caliber: 120 mm (4.7 in)
- Breech: muzzle loaded
- Elevation: +45° to +80°
- Traverse: 6°
- Rate of fire: 10 rpm
- Muzzle velocity: 272 m/s (890 ft/s)
- Effective firing range: 6 km (3.7 mi)

The 120-PM-38 or M1938 was a 120 mm Soviet mortar that was used in large numbers by the Red Army during World War II. Although a conventional design its combination of light weight, mobility, heavy firepower and range saw its features widely copied by successive generations of mortars.

== Design ==
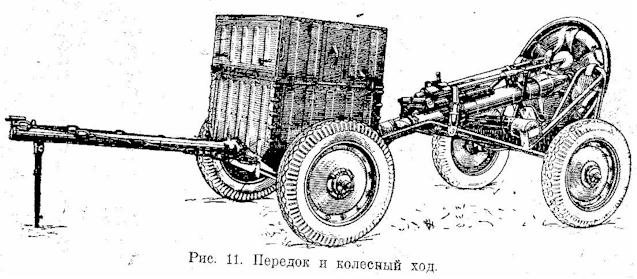
M1938 on its limber attached to a caisson

The origins of the M1938 lay in the French Mortier Brandt de 120mm Modele 1935 and the Brandt mle 27/31 which the Soviet Union produced under license as the 82-PM-36. In 1937 the Soviets produced a modified version of the 82-PM-36 known as the 82-PM-37 and this mortar served as the pattern for the 120-PM-38. The main difference between the 82-PM-37 and the earlier 82-PM-36 was the adoption of a round base-plate, revised traverse/elevation controls, simplified sights and spring-loaded shock absorbers on the bi-pod to reduce the amount of relaying needed between shots. The 120-PM-38 is essentially a scaled up 82-PM-37 which uses the same two-wheeled limber as the 107 mm PBHM-38. The limber works in much the same way as a hand truck. The limber is wheeled vertically into place, hooks on the base-plate hook onto the limber, the barrel is clamped down and then everything is lowered into towing position. The limber can either be towed directly or attached to a 20-round caisson for towing by a vehicle or horse team.

=== Ammunition ===
Shells specifications
Shot index	Shell index	Shell weight, kg	Mass of explosive, kg	Area of manpower destruction, m^{2}	Area of damage to equipment, m^{2}	Maximum firing range, km
HE
53-VF-843	53-F-843	16,2	3,93			4,1
HE/FRAG
53-VOF-843	53-OF-843	15,9	3,0			5,7
53-VOF-843А	53-OF-843A	15,9	1,58			5,52
53-VOF-843B	53-OF-843B	16	1,4	1200	200	5,7
3VOF3	3OF5	15,6	1,25			5,35
3VOF53	3OF34	16,1	3,43	2250	1200	5,7
3VOF57	3OF36	16,1	3,16	1700	700	5,7
Incendiary
53-VZ-843A	53-Z-843A	17	1,359	—	—	5,47
3VЗ4	3-Z-2	16,3	1,94	—	—	5,7
Smoke
53-VD-843A	53-D-843A	16,44	1,6	—	—	5,5
3VD5	3D5	16,6	1,65	—	—	5,8
3VD16	3D14	16,1		—	—	5,4
Illumination
53-VS-843	53-S-843	16,28	0,875	—	—	5,4
3VS24	3S9	16,28	1,28	—	—	5,4

== Employment ==
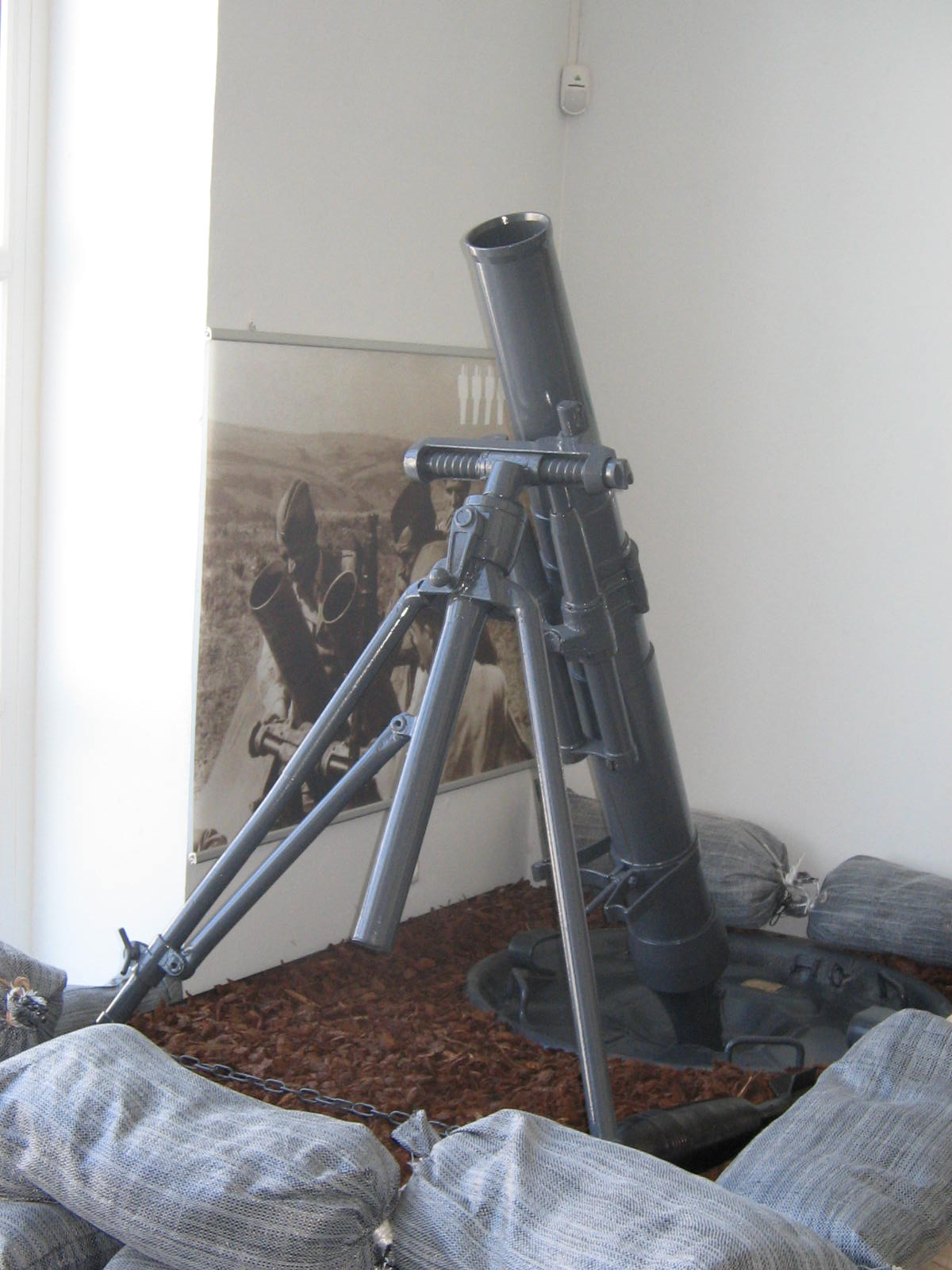
Romanian Reșița Model 1942

The 120-PM-38 was typically deployed to support infantry units and is the heaviest weapon that can still be broken down and transported by soldiers on foot. At first the 120-PM-38 was employed at the regimental level for indirect fire support in place of artillery, but as World War II continued it was issued down to the battalion level to supplement lighter mortars.

Getting the 120-PM-38 into and out of action was relatively rapid, so batteries were often moved to avoid counter-battery fire. Due to its rate of fire and large shell, a battery of four mortars could lay down a heavy amount of fire in a short period of time, which was useful for hit and run tactics. Another useful feature was the circular base-plate which allowed for changes in traverse without the need to dig out the base-plate and realign the barrel. Later 120-PM-43 mortars had a larger single shock absorber on the bi-pod to counteract the tendency of the base-plate to dig in on soft ground. 120-PM-43 mortars were kept in production long after World War II and sold to many Soviet client states. Both have seen widespread use in conflicts from World War II until today.

During the early phases of Operation Barbarossa the Germans captured large quantities of Soviet hardware including the 120-PM-38 which they designated the 12 cm Granatwerfer 378(r). After being on the receiving end of the 120-PM-38's firepower they adopted it to supplement their own mortars and eventually produced a modified version called the 12 cm Granatwerfer 42. The Granatwerfer 42 was widely issued to German units and often took the place of infantry guns later in the war. The Finnish and Romanians also made use of captured stocks of Soviet weapons and eventually the Romanians also created their own design, the Reșița Model 1942, produced at the Reșița Works with a rate of 80 pieces per month as of October 1942.

In 2016 it was in service in Moldova, Russian Federation, Turkmenistan, and Ukraine.
