= ML 3-inch mortar =

United Kingdom's standard mortar from the early 1930s to the late 1960s

Ordnance ML 3-inch mortar
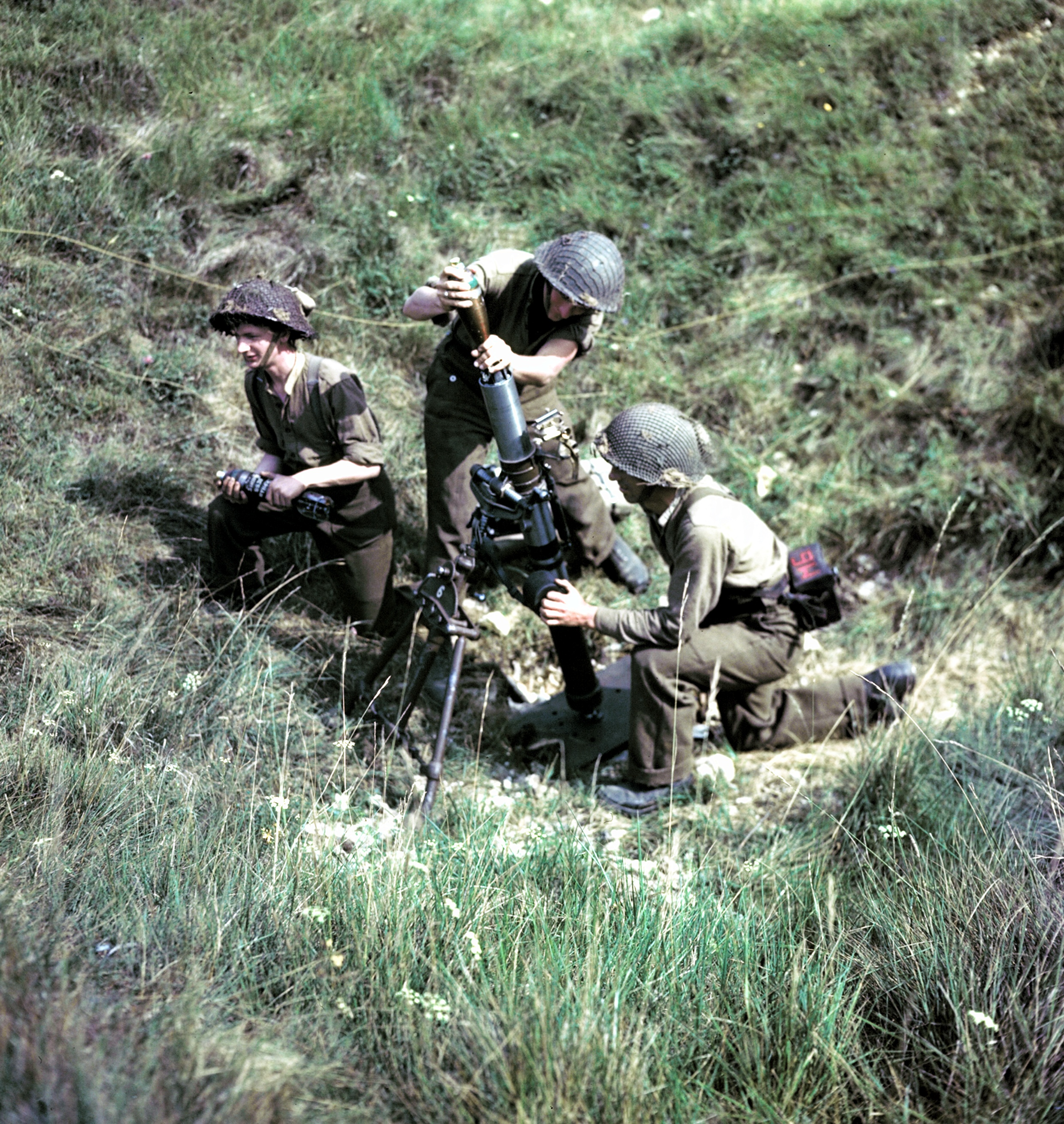
- Canadian 3-inch mortar team
- Type: Mortar
- Place of origin: United Kingdom

Service history
- In service: 1936–1980s
- Used by: See § Users
- Wars: See § Conflicts

Production history
- Designed: 1932
- Manufacturer: Royal Ordnance
- Produced: 1930s–1950s

Specifications
- Mass: Base plate/sight: 37 lb (17 kg); Barrel/spares: 34 lb (15 kg); Bipod: 44.5 lb (20.2 kg); Total: 115.5 lb (52.4 kg)
- Length: 4 ft 3 in (1.3 m)
- Barrel length: 3 ft 11 in (1.19 m)
- Shell: Bomb 10 lb (4.5 kg)
- Calibre: 3.19 in (81.0 mm)
- Elevation: +45° to +80°
- Traverse: 11°
- Muzzle velocity: 650 ft/s (200 m/s)
- Maximum firing range: Mk.II: 1,600 yd (1,500 m); Mk.II LR: 2,800 yd (2,600 m)

The Ordnance ML 3-inch mortar was the United Kingdom's standard mortar used by the British Army from the early 1930s to the late 1960s, superseding the Stokes mortar. Initially handicapped by its short range compared to similar Second World War mortars, improvements of the propellant charges enabled it to be used with great satisfaction by various armies of the British Empire and of the Commonwealth.

== Design ==
The ML 3-inch mortar is a conventional Stokes-type mortar that is muzzle-loaded and drop-fired. The ammunition used many of the Brandt mortar features.

== History ==
Based on their experience in World War I, the British infantry sought some sort of artillery for close support. The initial plan was for special batteries of artillery, but the cost was prohibitive and the mortar was accepted instead.

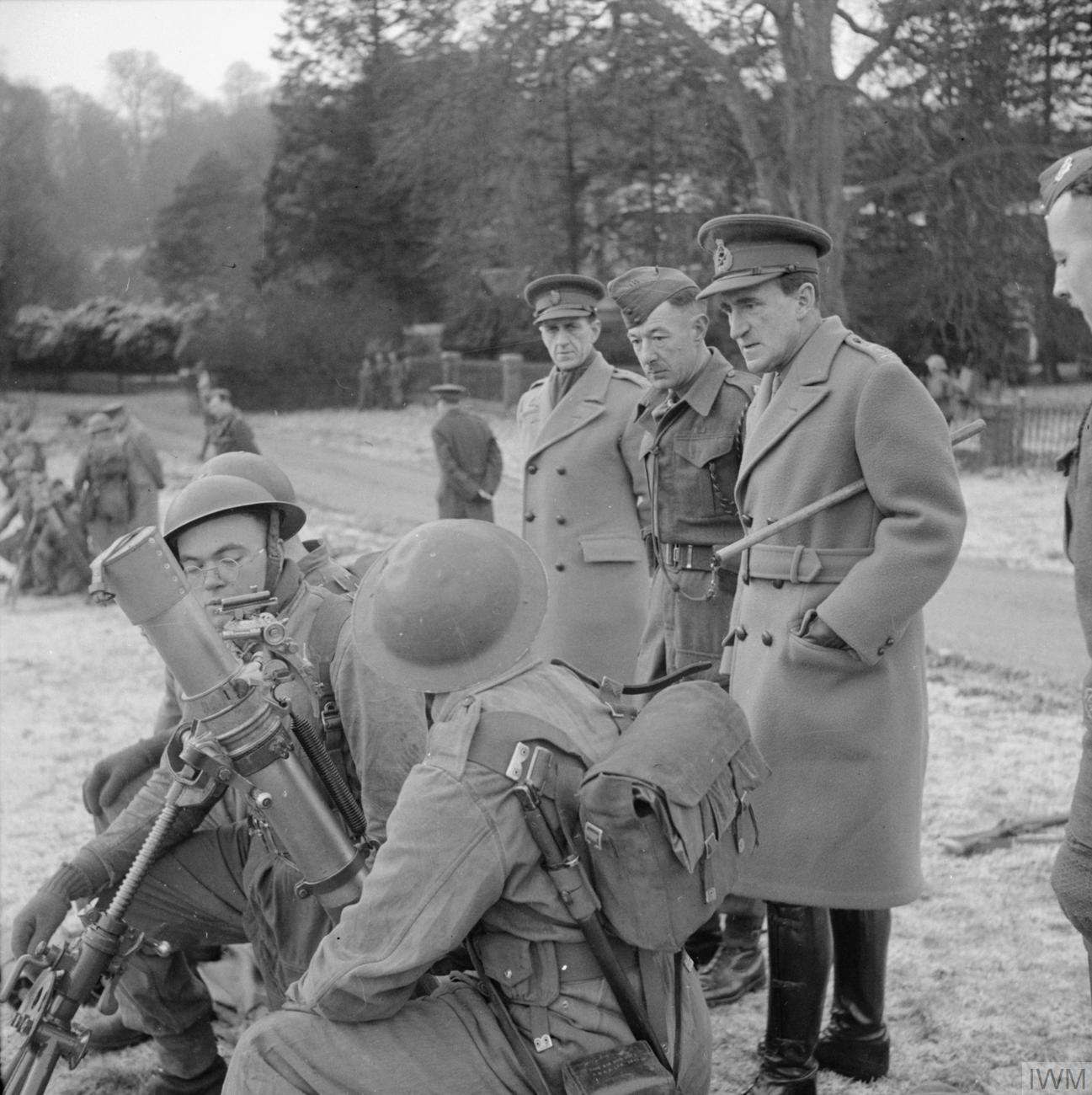
General Sir Bernard Paget, C-in-C Home Forces, inspecting a 3-inch mortar crew, 9 January 1943.

The Mark II mortar (Mark I was the Stokes) was adopted by the British Army in the early 1930s; and this was the standard British mortar when World War II broke out in September 1939. Experience in the early part of the war showed that, although the Mark II was reliable and sturdy, it did not have sufficient range compared to the German 81 mm s.GW.34 mortar. A series of experiments and trials using new propellants improved the range from 1,600 to 2,800 yards (1,500 to 2,600 m) by about 1942; and, by 1943, the barrel, baseplate and sights had also been improved.

The ML 3-inch mortar was carried on three packs by infantry or on Universal Carriers. An infantry battalion had six mortars with their Universal Carrier transports forming the Mortar Platoon within the HQ Company (later the support company). The carrier would carry the mortar, the three man crew (Note: The crew were No. 1 - carrying the baseplate and optics, No 2 - the tube and spare parts, No 3 bipod and three bombs in their container.) and 66 mortar bombs (the Carrier crew would carry the bombs from the Carrier to the mortar

The Mark II remained in service with the British Army until replaced by the L16 81mm mortar in 1965.

Ammunition was HE, Smoke (white phosphorus or titanium tetrachloride), and Illumination

== Variants ==
- Mark II LR - long range
- Mark IV - heavier baseplate and new sight
- Mark V - lightened for use by airborne units and in the Far East, about 5,000 produced.
- The Canadian Army modified some of its 3-inch mortars, lengthening them to increase their range. This modification was abandoned as it was considered too heavy.
- The Australian Army, for its part, shortened the barrel for use in jungle.

== Users ==
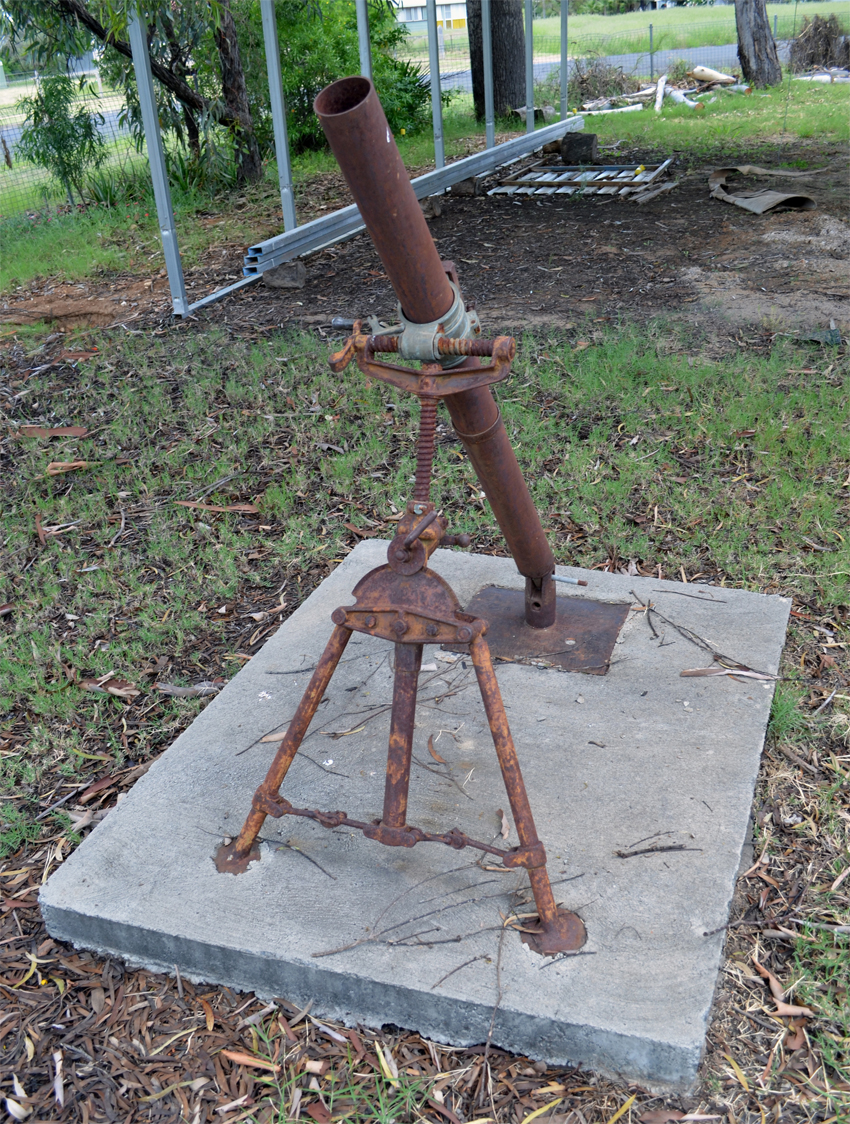
Returned & Services League building, Roma, Queensland

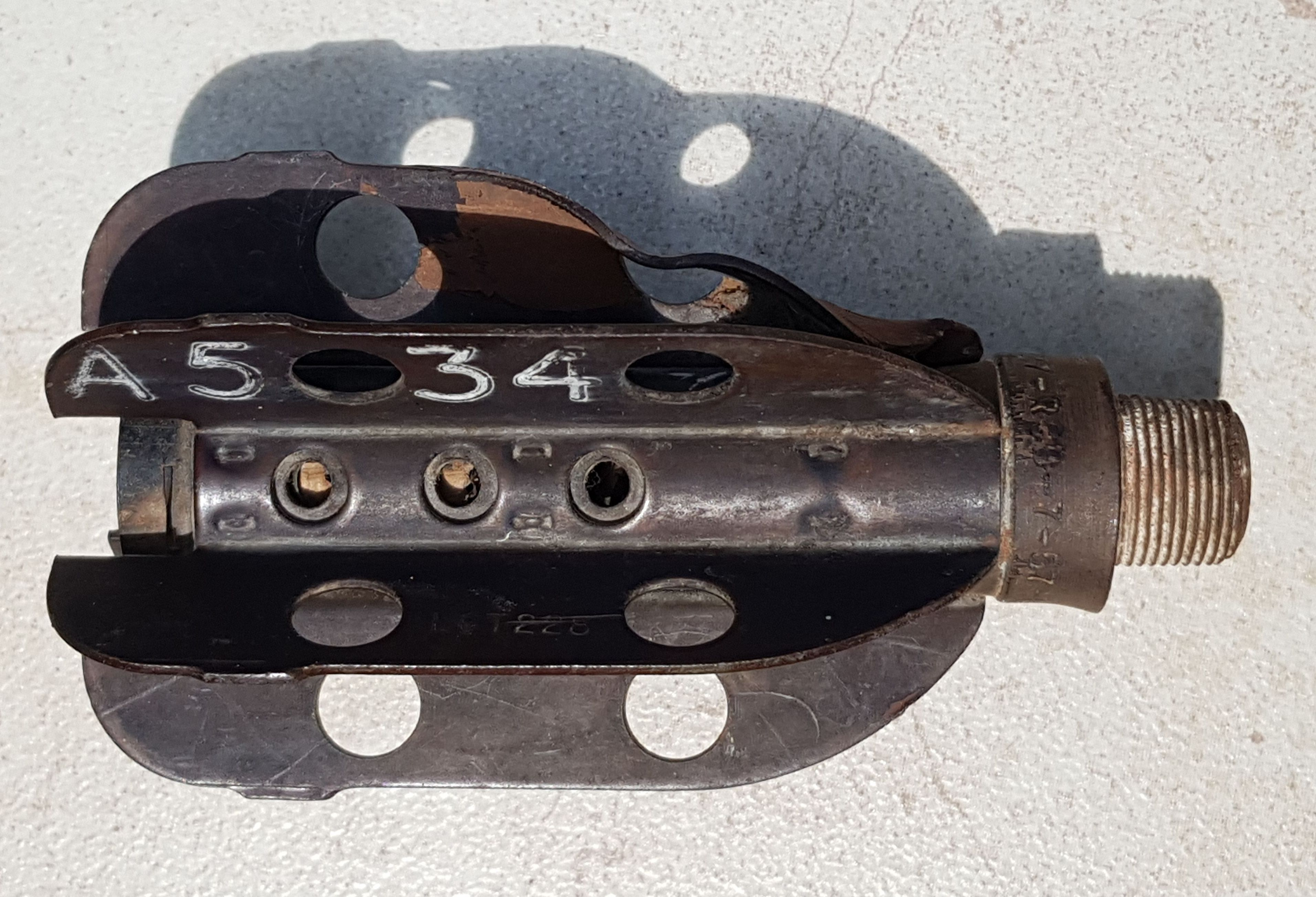
Tail unit of 3-inch mortar bomb fired by the Royal Jordanian Army on 5 June 1967, during the Six-Day War

- Afghanistan – used by the anti-Soviet insurgents in the 1980s
- Australia
- Biafra
- Canada
- Egypt
- Greece
- India
- Iraq
- Ireland
- Italy (1944–1946)
- Jordan
- Luxembourg
- Myanmar – Inherited from British-Burma Army and also bought from India. Main medium mortar used by the Myanmar Army until 1970s.
- New Zealand
- Nigeria
- Pakistan
- Philippines
- Poland – Used by the Polish Armed Forces in the West
- South Yemen
- Tibet
- United Kingdom
- Yugoslavia – Used by Yugoslavian Partisans

== Conflicts ==
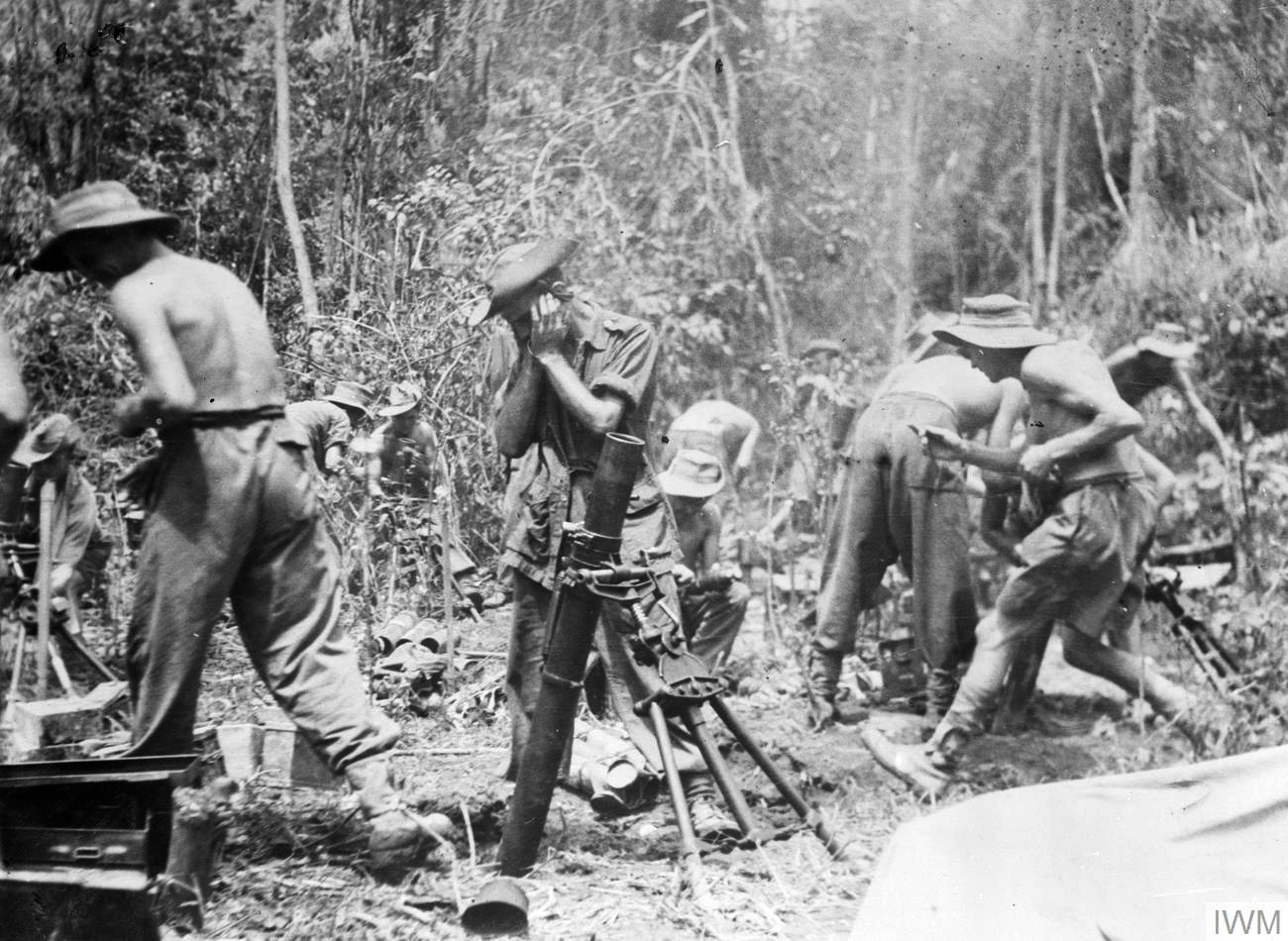
In action in Burma, 1944

- Second World War
- Indo-Pakistani War of 1947–1948
- 1948 Arab–Israeli War
- Korean War
- Suez Crisis
- Sino-Indian War
- Nigerian Civil War
- Soviet-Afghan War

== See also ==
- Stokes mortar : British WWI predecessor
- List of infantry mortars

Weapons of comparable role, performance and era

- 8 cm Granatwerfer 34 – German WWII equivalent
- 82-BM-37 & 82-PM-41 – Soviet WWII equivalents
- Brandt Mle 27/31 – French WWII equivalent
- M1 mortar – US WWII equivalent
- Type 97 81 mm infantry mortar – Japanese WWII equivalent

== Gallery ==
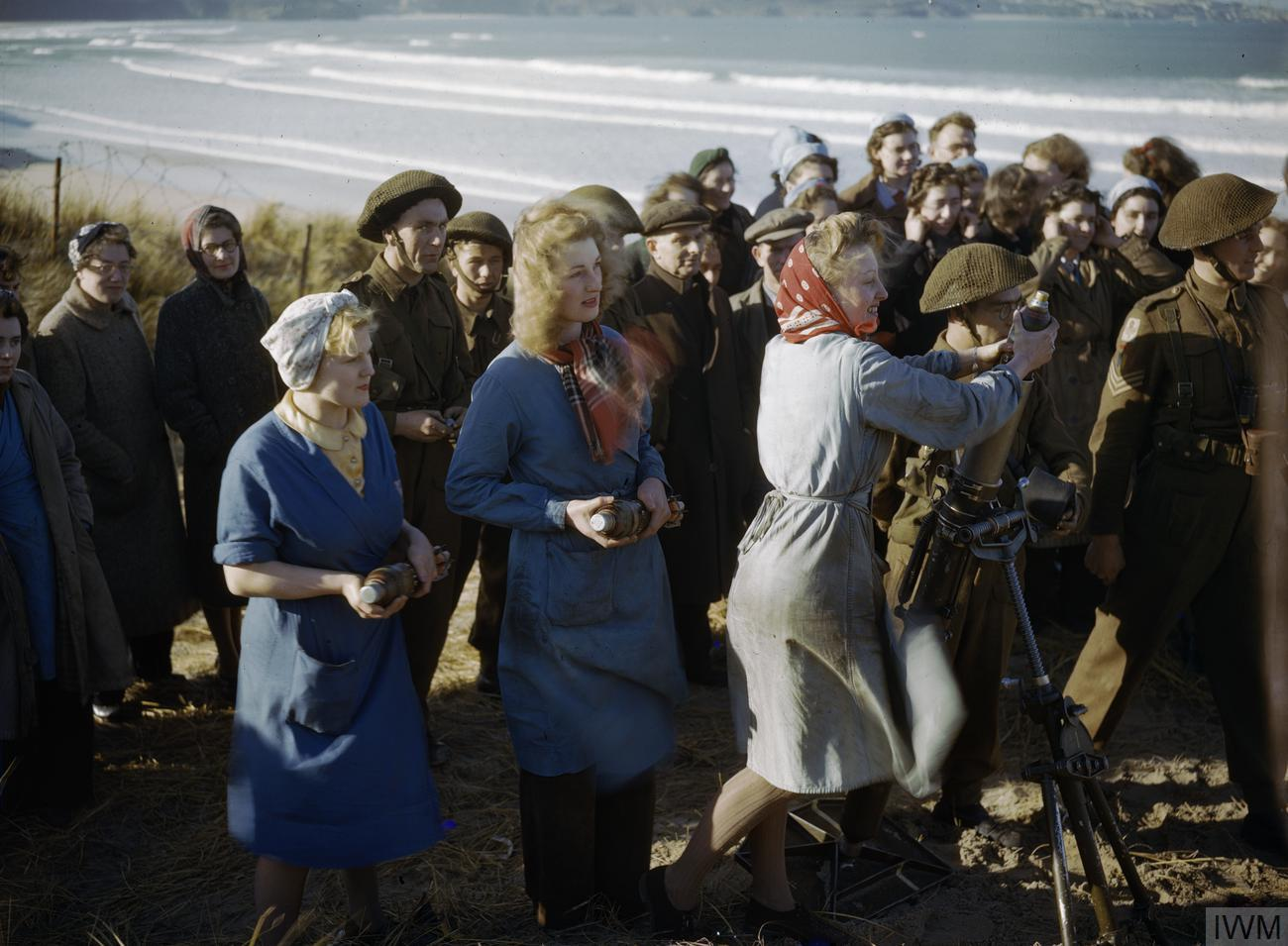
Munitions workers being shown how to fire the 3-inch mortar on a range in 1943. Their factory had produced one million mortar bombs.

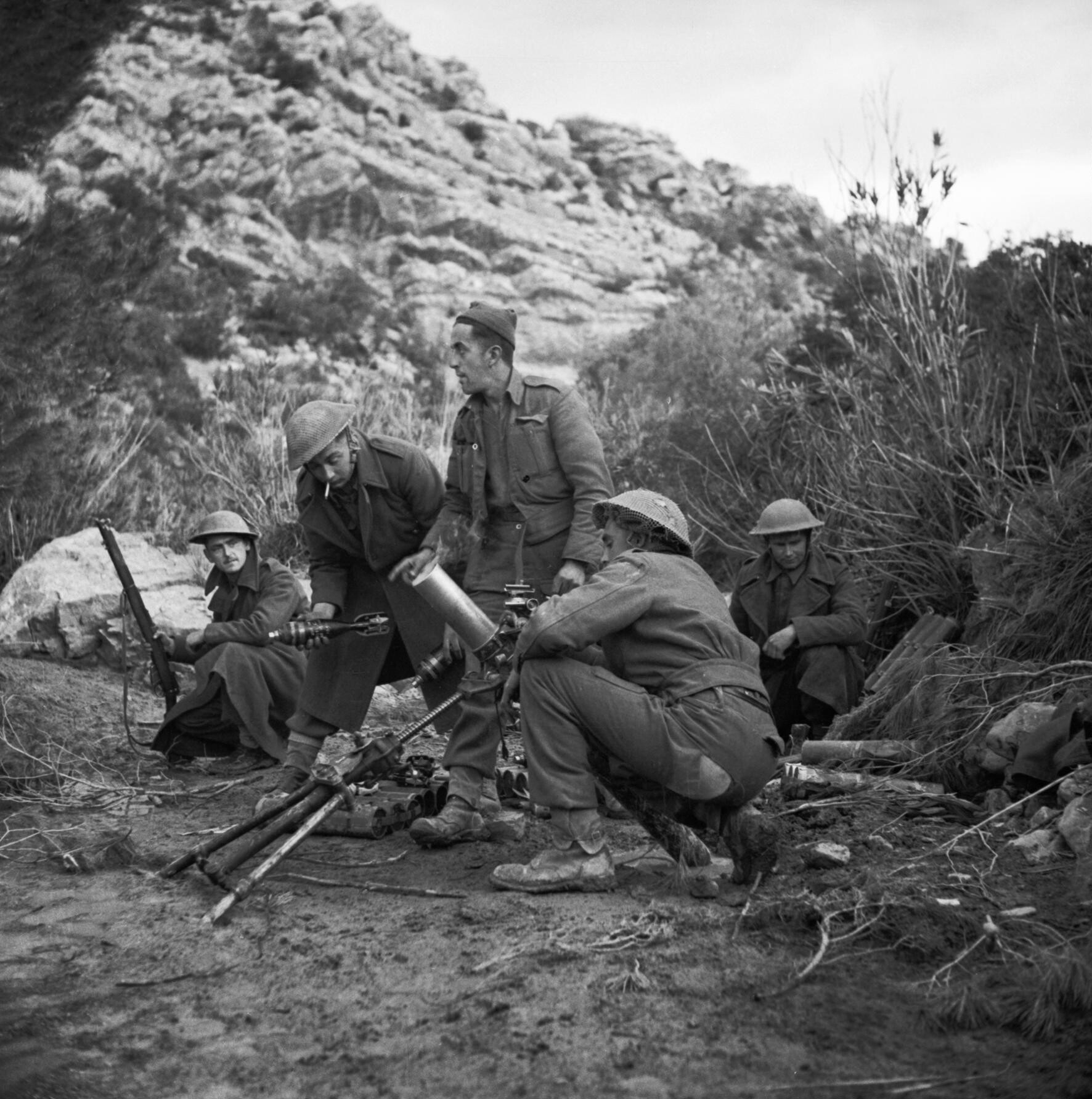
A mortar crew from the Queen's Own Royal West Kent Regiment in action in Tunisia, 31 January 1943.

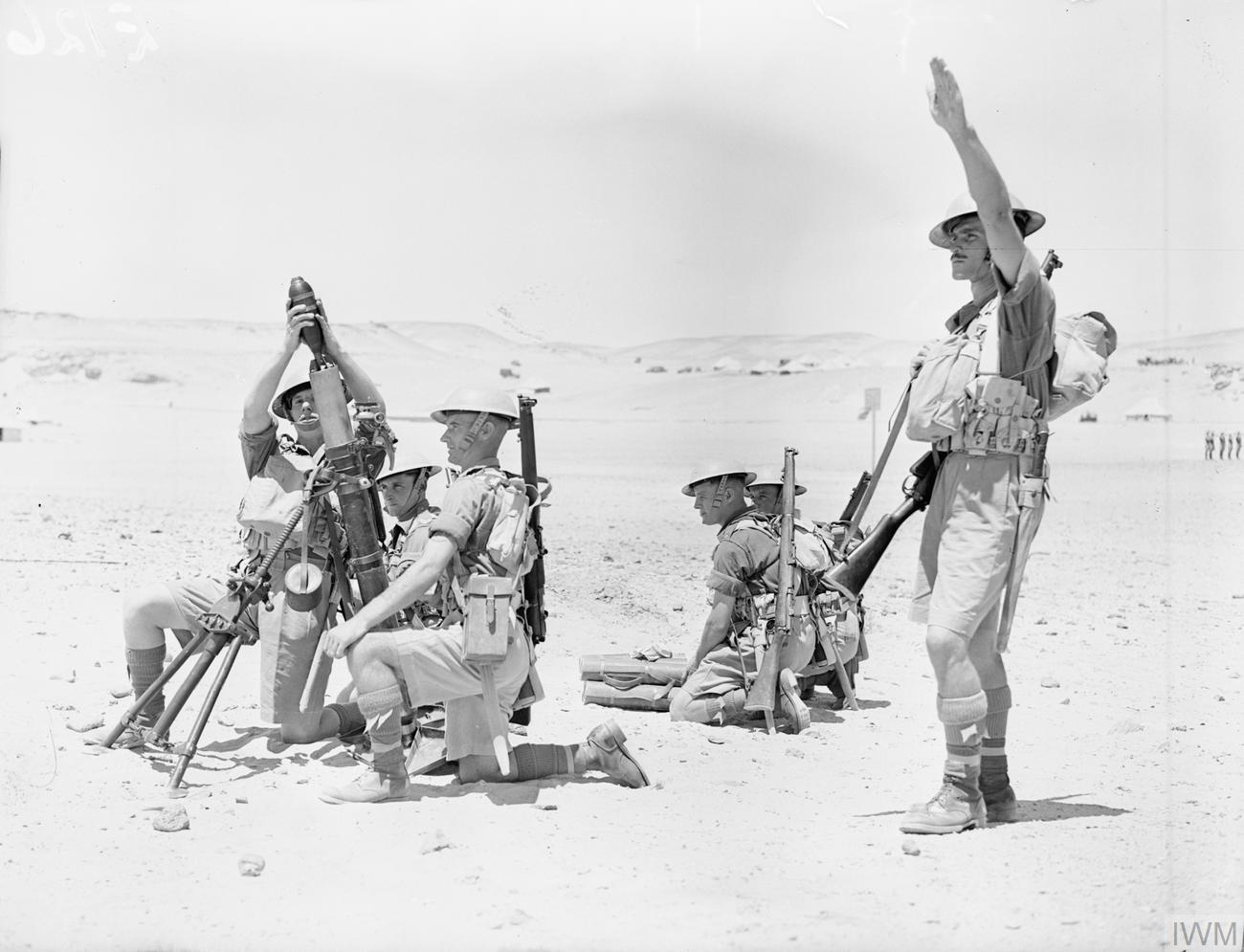
The Queen's Own Cameron Highlanders training at Mena Camp near Giza, Egypt, 4 June 1940.

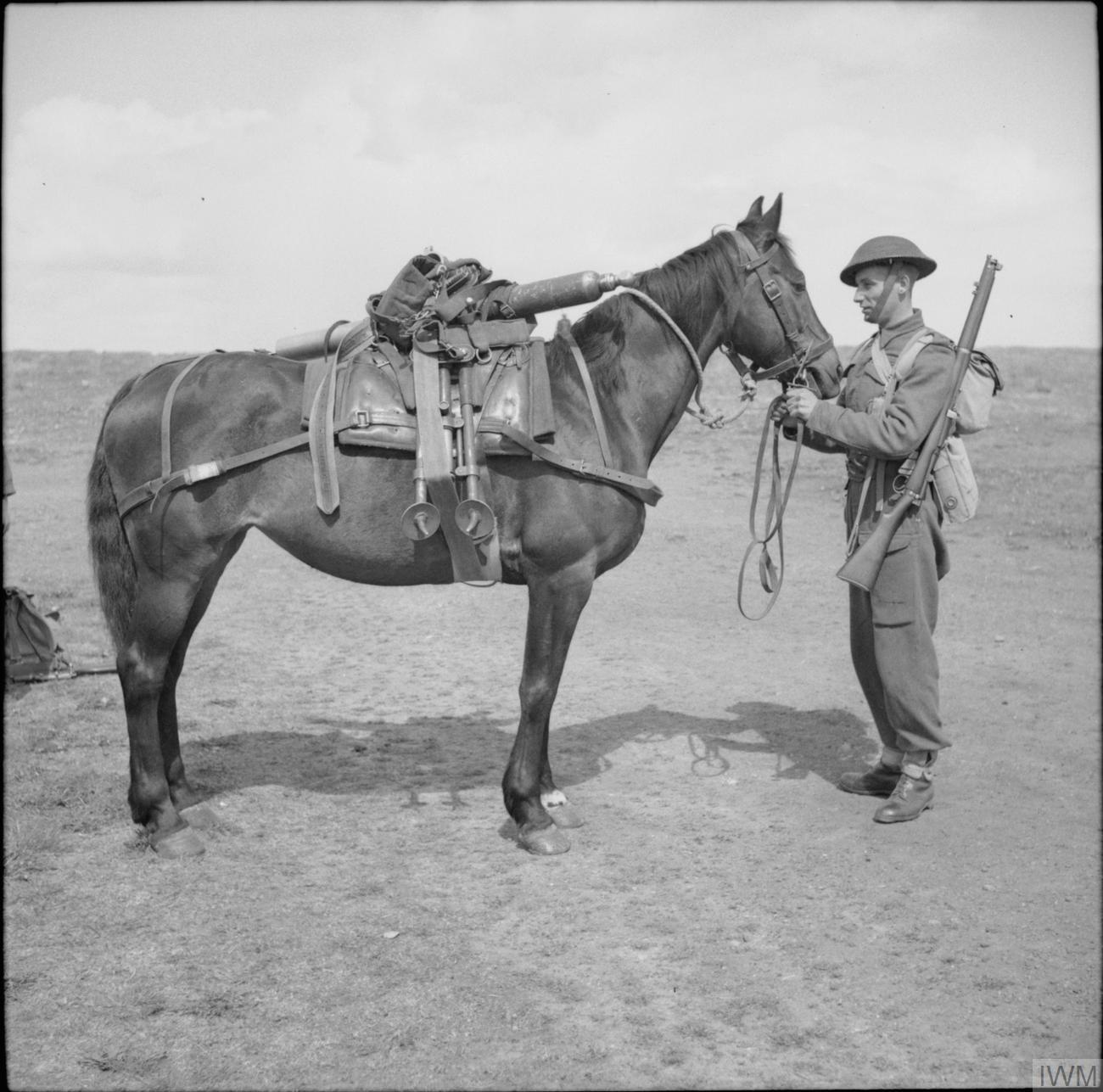
Pack horse carrying a 3-inch mortar of the Highland Light Infantry, Scotland, 7 May 1943.

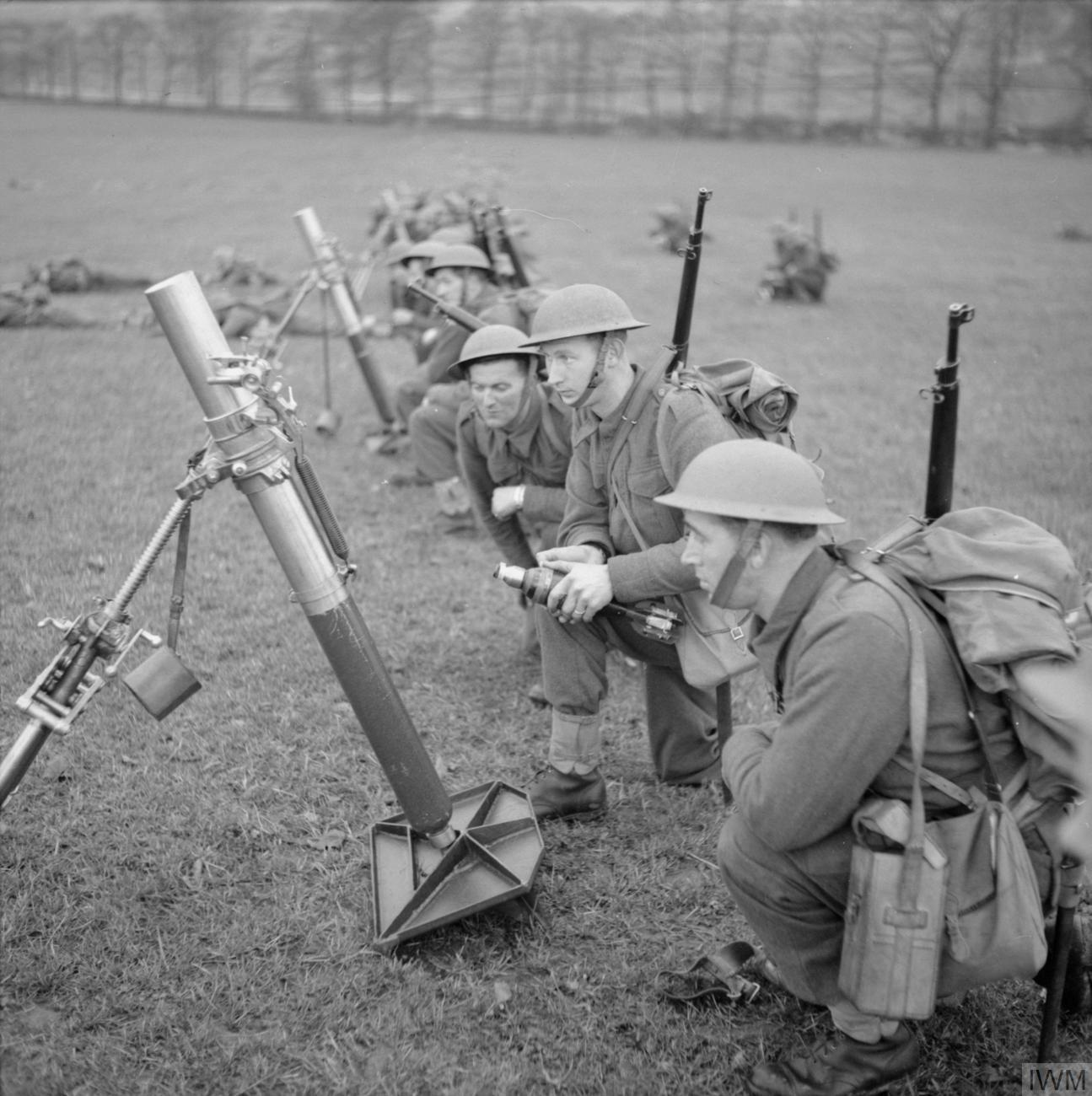
Norwegian troops with 3-inch mortars, Coatbridge, Scotland, 10 November 1940.
