= Brandt Mle 27/31 =

Brandt mle 27
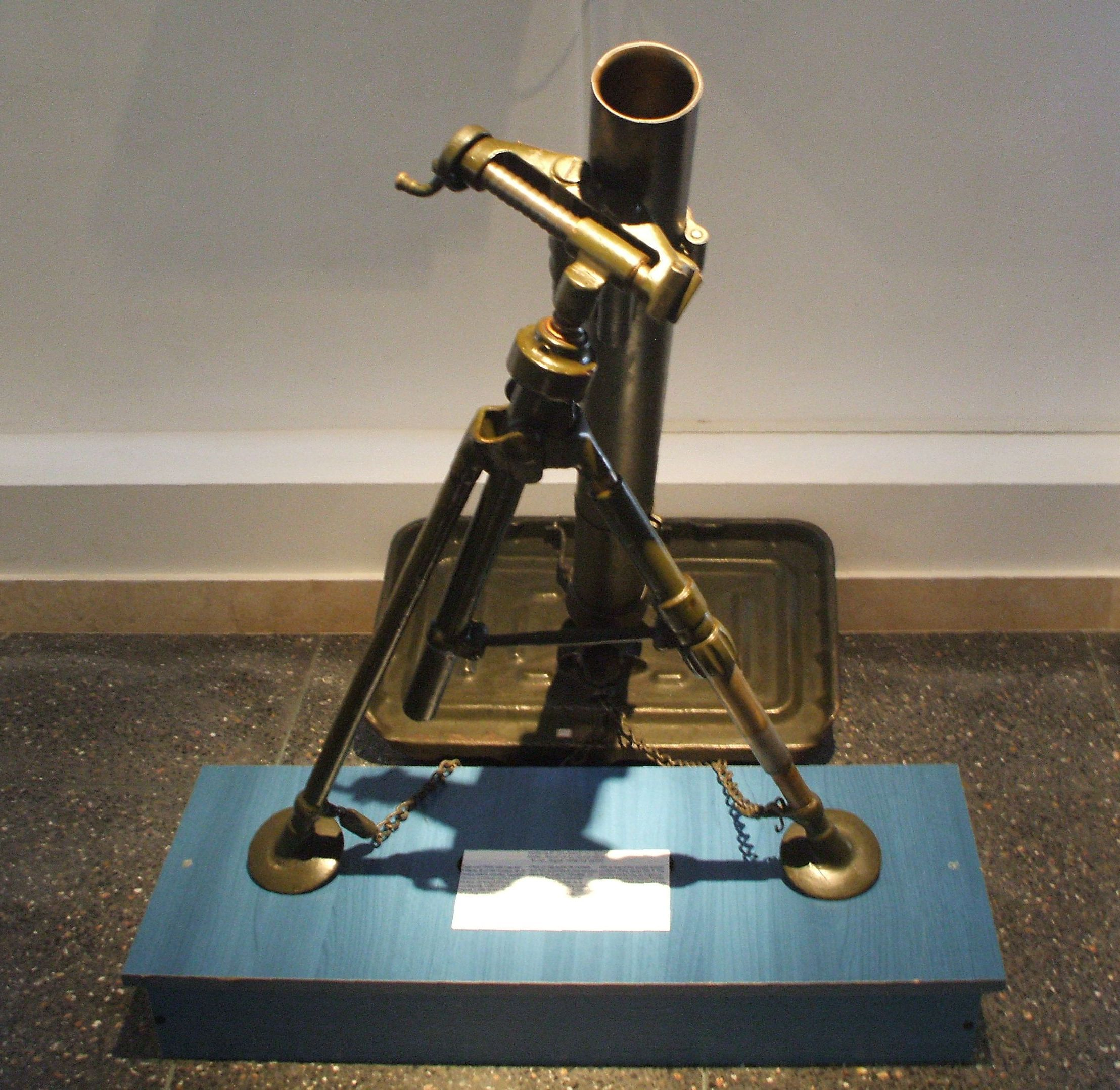
- Brandt Mle 27/31 on display at the Romanian Navy Museum
- Type: Mortar
- Place of origin: France

Service history
- Used by: See Users
- Wars: Second World War; First Indochina War; Algerian War; Portuguese Colonial War; Vietnam War

Production history
- Designer: Edgar Brandt
- No. built: 8000
- Variants: L13.7; L/15.6

Specifications
- Mass: 56 kg (123 lb)
- Barrel length: 1.11 m (3 ft 8 in) L/13.7; 1.26 m (4 ft 2 in) L/15.6
- Crew: 3
- Shell weight: Light: 3.25 kg (7 lb 3 oz); Heavy: 6.5 kg (14 lb 5 oz)
- Caliber: 81 mm (3.2 in)
- Elevation: +45° to +85°
- Traverse: 8° to 12° variable with elevation
- Rate of fire: 18 rounds per minute
- Muzzle velocity: 174 m/s (570 ft/s)
- Effective firing range: Light: 2.8 km (1.7 mi); Heavy: 1.2 km (0.75 mi)

The Brandt mle 27/31 mortar was a regulation weapon of the French army during the Second World War. Designed by Edgar Brandt, it was a refinement of the Stokes mortar. The Brandt mortar was highly influential, being licensed built or copied by numerous countries.

== Development history ==
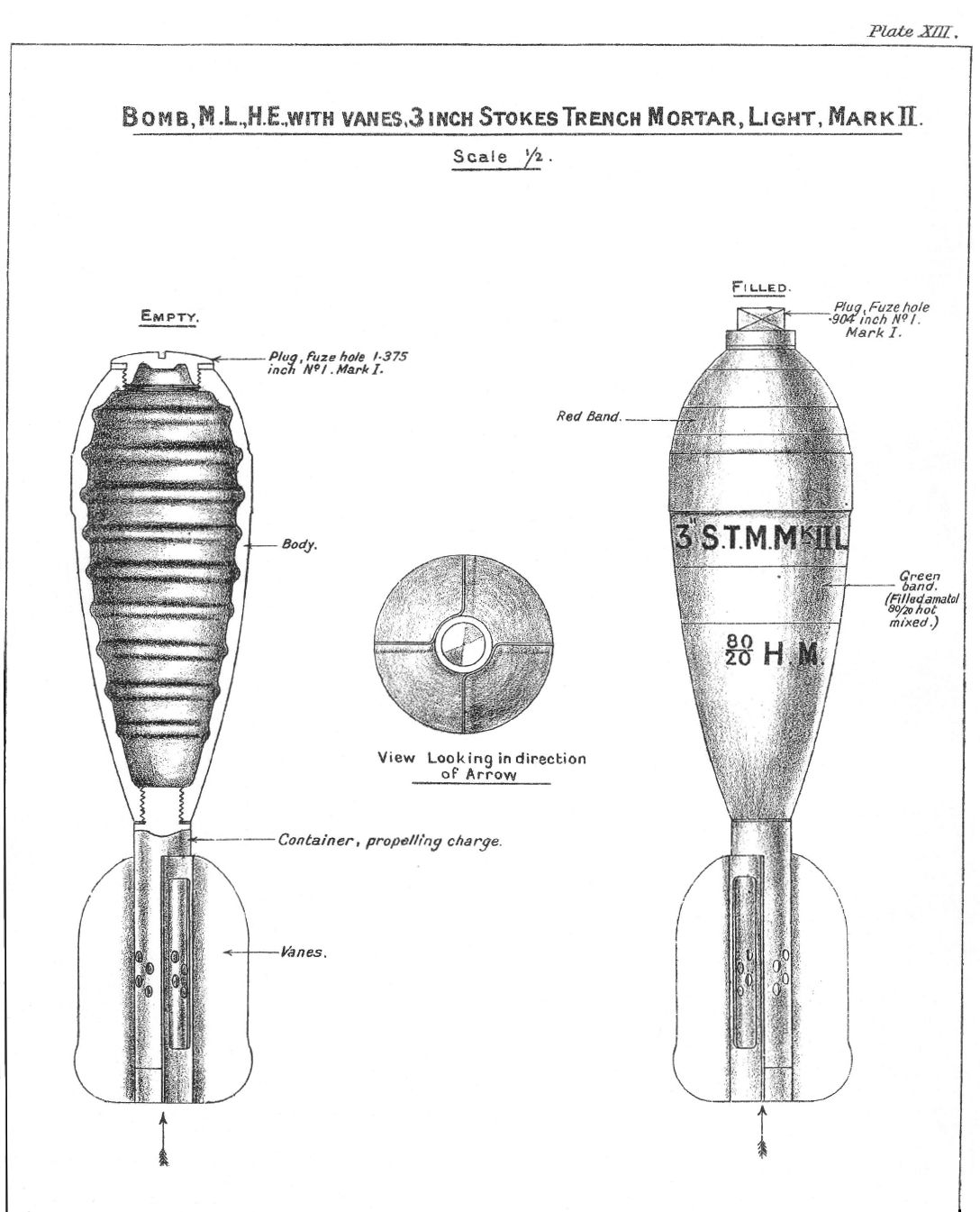
Mk. II vaned HE bomb of Brandt's type for 3-inch Stokes mortar

In 1915, about the same time when British civil engineer Wilfred Stokes turned to developing trench mortars for the troops, the French applied artist, silversmith and ironsmith Edgar Brandt did the same while serving in the French Army. He developed two pneumatic weapons, obusier pneumatique Brandt de 60 mm modèle 1915 on a tripod carriage and later also modèle 1916 on a cast aluminium baseplate. The first type of the shell (projectile type A) had an aerodynamic teardrop body with flat stabilizers (called vanes or fins) and an obturation groove around its widest part, both features that would define the design of mortar shells in decades to come.

In September 1917, the under-secretary of state for inventions sent a circular letter requesting inventors to design a better projectile for the successful Stokes mortar, and Brandt scaled his 60 mm projectile up to 81 mm. Both the British and French militaries adopted the scaled-up design except for the grooves (apparently, their importance wasn't realized at the time) in 1918 as projectile BM (Brandt-Maurice) modèle 1918 (later simplified to FA (fonte aciérée) modèle 1921) and Mk. II HE bomb respectively.

After several years of further development, Brandt applied for a patent in January 1925 on a mortar shell with several obturation grooves (of several types), a design which has not in principle changed in the century since. The French shell FA modèle 1924/27 was soon adopted in place of the BM Mle 1918, closely followed the drawing in the patent; the FA modèle 1932 offered even more improvement in range. It was this refined projectile design that made the Stokes-Brandt mortar so superior compared to the WWI Stokes: with Brandt-type WWII shells, the latter was able to reach 2,650 yards (2.42 km) in range.

== Description ==
The Brandt mle 27/31 was a simple and effective weapon, consisting of a smoothbore metal tube fixed to a base plate (to absorb recoil), with a lightweight bipod mount. The mle 27/31 could be disassembled into three loads, plus the ammunitions loads, and a complete crew was 10 men. When a mortar bomb was dropped into the tube, an impact sensitive primer in the base of the bomb would make contact with a firing pin at the base of the tube, and detonate, firing the bomb towards the target. HE and smoke mortar bombs fired by the weapon weighed 3.25 kilograms.

== Users ==
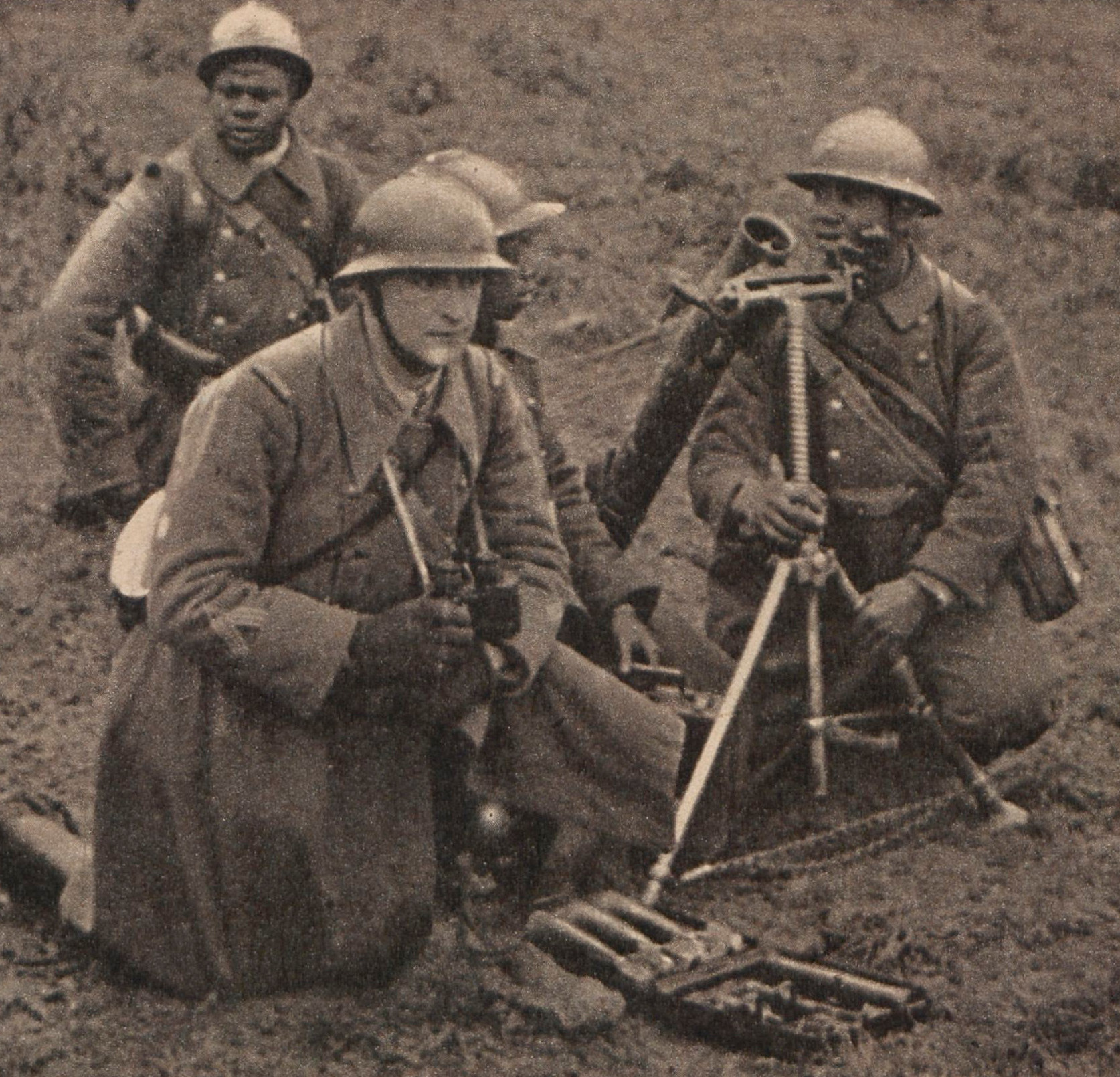
A Senegalese Tirailleurs crew with a Brandt Mle 1927/31 mortar, December 1939.

Brandt's innovative projectile design along with the Stokes Mortar provided the pattern for most World War II era light mortars.

In 1928, an unlicensed Polish copy was made as the Avia wz.28 but, due to French pressure, it was abandoned in 1931 because the French Brandt company held the patent for the ammunition. The Polish then produced a licensed copy as the wz.31 model (Polish: Moździerz piechoty 81 mm wz. 31 starting in 1935; 1,050 were made in Pruszków. By 1939, the Polish army was equipped with some 1,200 Stokes-Brandt mortars, most of them the newer 1931 model. Each Polish infantry battalion was intended to be equipped with four such mortars, but there were not enough available to fulfill this disposition. The upgraded 1931 version was used by the Polish Army during, amongst others, the Battle of Westerplatte in 1939. An unspecified amount, probably a few hundred, were sold to Republican Spain in 1936-1938.

In Romania, the mortar was licence-produced at the Voina Works in Brașov, with a production rate of 30 pieces per month as of October 1942 (over 1,000 such mortars were built in Romania by mid-1943). 360 mortars captured by the Germans from the French were also received in 1942.

Country	Weapon name	German designation for captured mortars	Notes
Austria		8 cm GrW 33(ö)	
Czechoslovakia	81.4 mm minomet,	8.14 cm GrW 278(t)	License-built variant
Czechoslovakia	8 cm minomet vz. 36	8 cm GrW M.36(t)	Modified variant
Republic of China		-	French and Austrian versions
Republic of China	Type 20 mortar	-	Local copy produced from 1931 in Jinling Arsenal
Denmark	81.4 mm L/12	8.14 cm GrW 275(d)	
Estonia			
Finland	81 mm Tampella	-	
Norway	8.1 cm Bombekaster m/35	-	License-built variant
France	Mortier Brandt de 81 mm mle 27/31	8.14 cm GrW 278(f) 8.14 cm GrW 278/1(f)	
France	mle 44 ACC, mle 44 ATS, mle 44 ARE	-	
Ireland		-	
Kingdom of Italy	Mortaio da 81/14 Modello 35	8.1 cm GrW 276(i)	Slightly-modified copy
Empire of Japan	Type 3 81 mm mortar		Slightly-modified copy
Empire of Japan	Type 97 81 mm infantry mortar		Modified variant
Nazi Germany	8 cm Granatwerfer 34, Kz 8 cm GrW 42		
Netherlands	Mortier van 8 Brandt (M.27/31)	8.14 cm GrW 286(h)	Produced under license
Portugal	m/937 8 cm		French variant
Philippines			
Poland	Moździerz piechoty 81 mm wz. 31	8 cm GrW 31(p)	
Kingdom of Romania		-	License-built variant
Sweden	8 cm GrK m/29	-	
Soviet Union	82-PM-36	8.2 cm GrW 274/1(r)	Modified copy
Soviet Union	82-PM-37	8.2 cm GrW 274/2(r)	Upgraded 82-PM-36
Soviet Union	82-PM-41	8.2 cm GrW 274/3(r)	Upgraded 82-PM-37
United States	M1 mortar	?	Modified copy
Vietnam		-	French-made
Kingdom of Yugoslavia	8.1 cm MWM 31/38 Kragujevac	8.14 cm GrW 270(j)	

== See also ==
- Reihenwerfer - An armored self-propelled barrage mortar based on the mle 27/31.
