= 8 cm Granatwerfer 34 =

WWII German infantry mortar

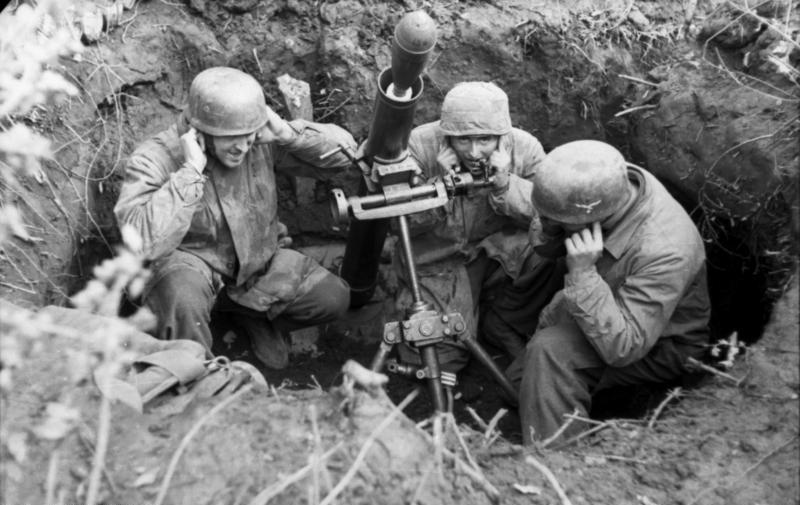
- A mortar in action during the Battle of Monte Cassino
- Type: Mortar
- Place of origin: Nazi Germany

Service history
- In service: 1937–1952
- Wars: World War II

Production history
- Designer: Rheinmetall
- Designed: 1932–1934
- Unit cost: 810 Reichsmark
- Produced: 1934–1945
- No. built: 75,255
- Variants: 8 cm GrW 34/1

Specifications
- Mass: 62 kg (136.6 lbs) steel barrel 57 kg (125.6 lbs) alloy barrel
- Barrel length: 1.14 m (3 ft 9 in)
- Shell: 3.5 kg (7 lb 11 oz)
- Caliber: 81.4 mm (3.20 in)
- Elevation: 45° to 90°
- Traverse: 10° to 23°
- Rate of fire: 15-25 rpm
- Muzzle velocity: 174 m/s (571 ft/s)
- Effective firing range: 400–1,200 m (440–1,310 yd)
- Maximum firing range: 2.4 km (1.5 mi)

The 8 cm Granatwerfer 34 (8 cm GrW. 34) was the standard German infantry mortar throughout World War II. It was noted for its accuracy and rapid rate of fire.

== History ==
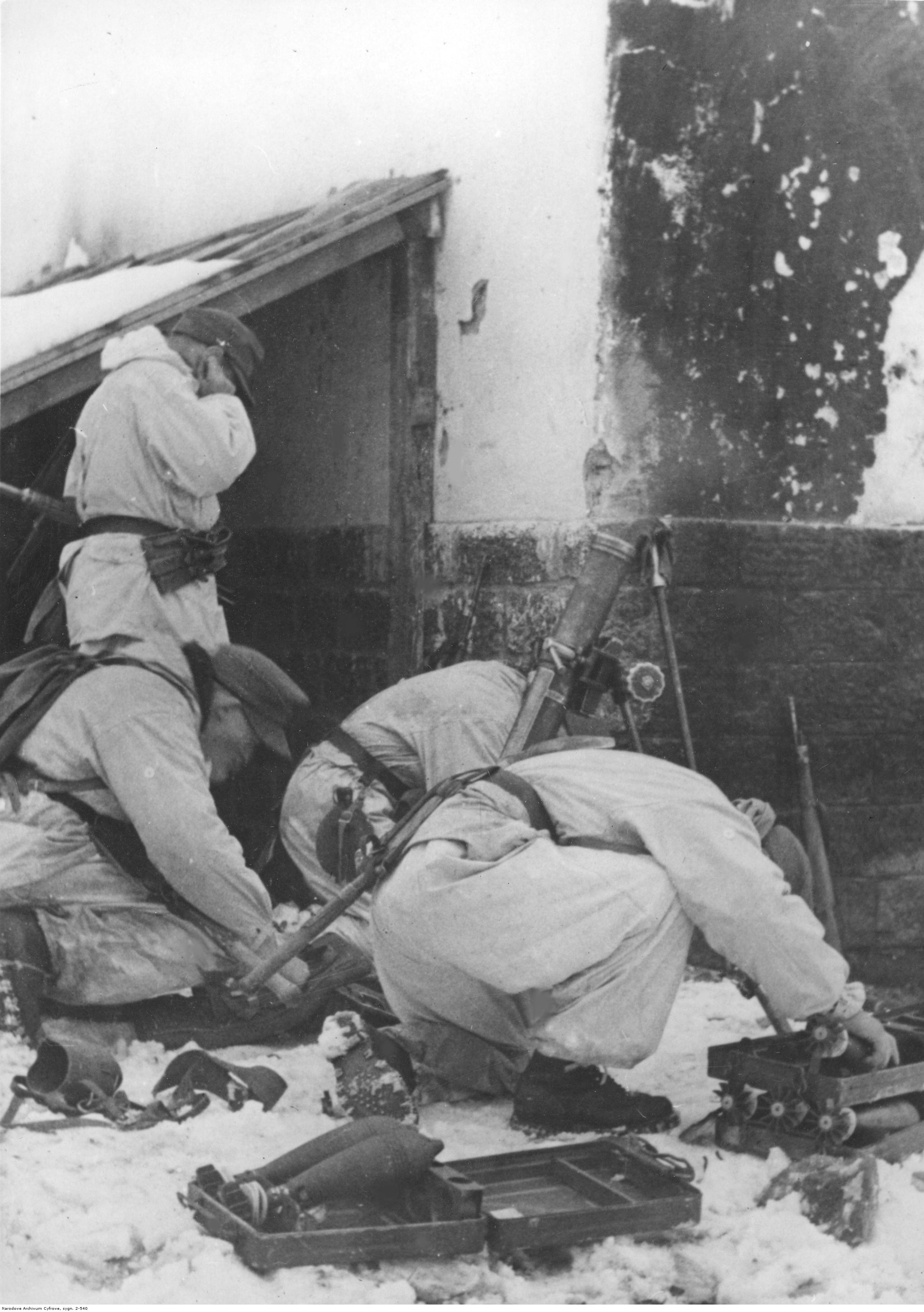
A four-man crew of Waffen-SS soldiers firing on Yugoslavian partisans, December 1943.

The weapon was of conventional design and broke down into three loads (smooth bore barrel, bipod, baseplate) for transport. Attached to the bipod were a traversing handwheel and a cross-leveling handwheel below the elevating mechanism. A panoramic sight was mounted on the traversing mechanism yoke for fine adjustments. A line on the tube could be used for rough laying.

The 8 cm GrW 34/1 was an adaptation for use in self-propelled mountings. A lightened version with a shorter barrel was put into production as the kurzer 8 cm Granatwerfer 42.

The mortar employed conventional 8 cm 3.5 kg shells (high explosive or smoke) with percussion fuzes. The range could be extended by fitting up to three additional powder charges between the shell tailfins.

A total of 74,336,000 rounds of ammunition were produced for the Granatwerfer 34 from September 1939 to March 1945.

== Users ==
- Nazi Germany
- East Germany
- Bulgaria
- Yugoslav Partisans

== Ammunition ==
Early rounds were 80.7 mm (3.18 in) calibre, the 1940 design rounds were slightly larger at 80.9 mm (3.19 in)

Ammunition for the Granatwerfer 34.
| Name | Explosive mass | Target effect | Notes |
|---|---|---|---|
| Wurfgranate 34 ("Mortar grenade 34") | 533 g (18.8 oz) | Blast and shrapnel effect | |
| Wurfgranate 34 Blauring ("Mortar grenade 34 blue ring") | 530 g (19 oz) | Blast, shrapnel and chemical effect | Chemical agent: Adamsite |
| Wurfgranate 34 Ex ("Mortar grenade 34 dummy") | None | None (training ammunition) | Ammunition used for learning general handling |
| Wurfgranate 34 Nb ("Mortar grenade 34 smoke") | 500 g (18 oz) | Smoke | Sulfur trioxide in pumice stone |
| Wurfgranate 34 Üb ("Mortar grenade 34 training") | 57 g (2.0 oz) | Minimal blast effect | Training ammunition |
| Wurfgranate 34 Weißring ("Mortar grenade 34 white ring") | 550 g (19 oz) | Blast, shrapnel and chemical effect | Chemical agent: Phenacyl chloride |
| Wurfgranate 38 ("Mortar grenade 38") | 400 grams (14 oz) | Blast and shrapnel effect | |
| Wurfgranate 38 Deut ("Mortar grenade 38") | 200 g (7.1 oz) | | Ejection charge |
| Wurfgranate 38 umg ("Mortar grenade 38 rebuild") | 550 g (19 oz) | Blast and shrapnel effect | |
| Wurfgranate 39 ("Mortar grenade 39") | 400 grams (14 oz) | Blast and shrapnel effect | |
| Wurfgranate 40 ("Mortar grenade 40") | 2,000 g (4 lb 7 oz) | Blast and shrapnel effect | |
| Wurfgranate 40 Üb ("Mortar grenade 40 training") | None | None | Training ammunition |

== See also ==
- List of infantry mortars

=== Weapons of comparable role, performance and era ===
- Brandt Mle 27/31 — French equivalent (Note: Original French mortar design of the 1920s, after which all 3″/8 cm/81.4 mm/82 mm mortar ammunition of the Second World War era were patterned.)
- Ordnance ML 3 inch Mortar — British equivalent
- M1 mortar — US equivalent
