= 8 cm minomet vz. 36 =

- Type: medium mortar
- Place of origin: Czechoslovakia

Service history
- In service: 1936–1945
- Used by: Czechoslovakia; Nazi Germany; Slovakia
- Wars: World War II

Production history
- Designer: Škoda Works
- Manufacturer: Škoda Works
- Produced: 1936−39?

Specifications
- Mass: 62 kg (137 lb)
- Barrel length: 1.16 m (3 ft 10 in)
- Shell weight: 3.265 kg (7.20 lb) (light bomb); 6.85 kg (15.1 lb) (heavy bomb)
- Caliber: 81.3 mm (3.20 in)
- Elevation: +40° to +80°
- Traverse: 10°
- Muzzle velocity: 220 m/s (720 ft/s)
- Effective firing range: 1,200 m (1,300 yd) (heavy bomb)
- Maximum firing range: 3,400 m (3,700 yd) (light bomb)

The 8 cm minomet vz. 36 (mortar model 36) was a medium mortar designed by the Škoda Works during the Thirties. Intended as standard medium infantry mortar for the Czechoslovak Army all available weapons were impressed into service by the German Army when they occupied Bohemia-Moravia in March 1939 and the Slovaks seized approximately one hundred fifty when they declared independence from Czechoslovakia at the same time. Slovak weapons saw combat in the Slovak-Hungarian War, the invasion of Poland, the opening months of Operation Barbarossa and the Slovak National Uprising.

== Design ==
The 8 cm minomet vz. 36 was a close copy of the French Brandt series of mortars. While it differed in details the most important thing was that its ammunition was incompatible with the Brandt mortars. It fired two different mortar bombs, a light 3.265 kg (7.20 lb) bomb to a range of 3,400 m (3,700 yd) and a heavy 6.85 kg (15.1 lb) bomb to 1,200 m (1,300 yd). It broke down into three loads, barrel, baseplate and tripod, for transport. Normally one man carried each piece.

== Operational use ==
Approximately 900 were in Czechoslovak service in September 1938.

Mortars captured by the Germans were given the designation 8 cm GrW M.36(t). Nothing specific is known about German use although it likely saw service mostly with 2nd-line and reserve troops.

Slovakia seized approximately one hundred fifty when they declared independence from Czechoslovakia in March 1939. They were used as the standard medium infantry mortar for the duration of the war. They saw combat in the Slovak-Hungarian War, the invasion of Poland, the opening months of Operation Barbarossa and the Slovak National Uprising.
