= 82-BM-36 =

WW2 Soviet infantry mortar

82 mm M1936 Battalion Mortar
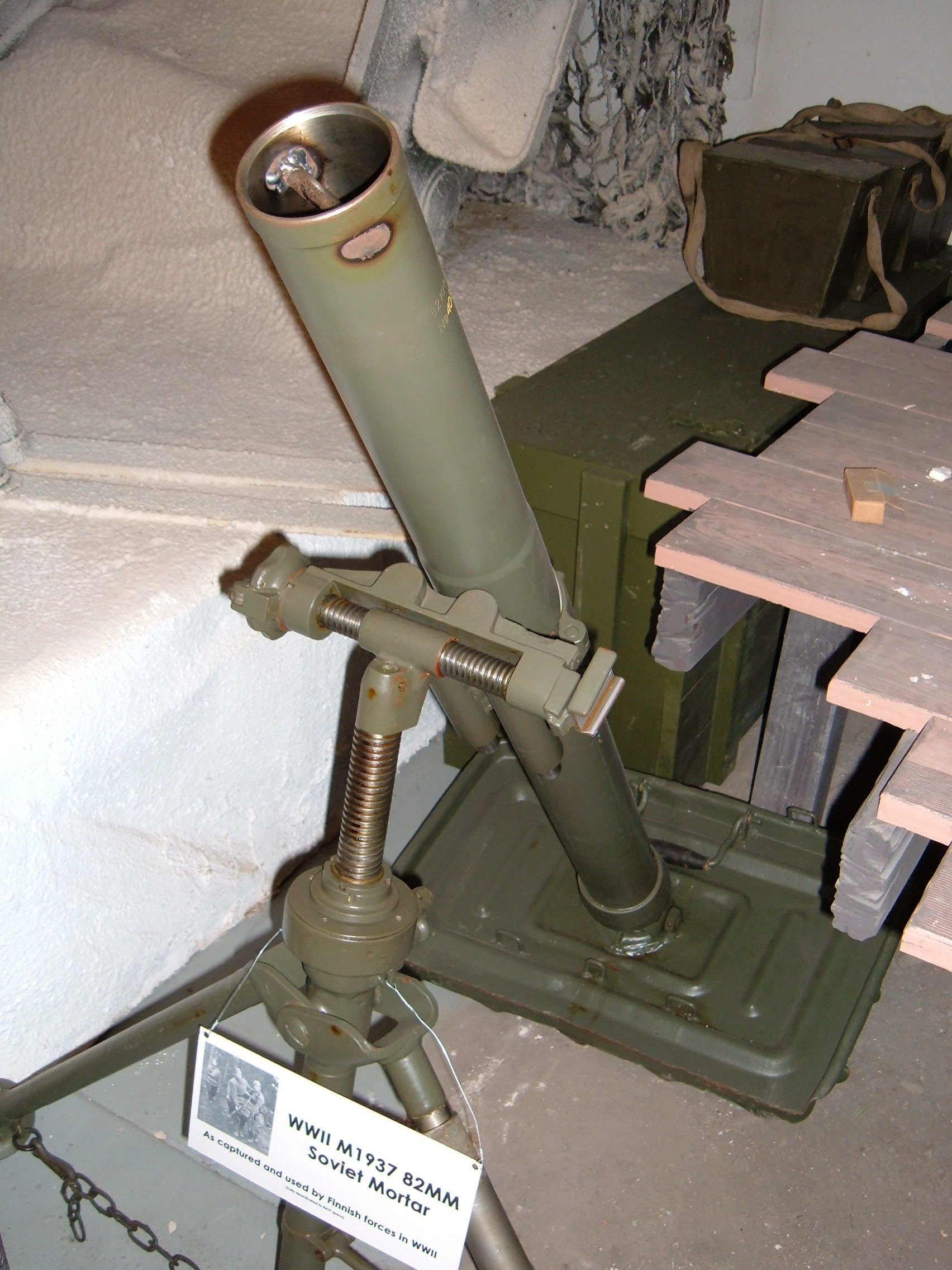
- 82 mm Soviet mortar M1936 labeled as M1937, captured and used by the Finns on display at the Sgt. Richard Penry Medal of Honor Memorial Military Museum in Petaluma, California.
- Type: Infantry mortar
- Place of origin: Soviet Union

Service history
- Used by: Soviet Union
- Wars: World War II; Korean War

Specifications
- Mass: 62 kg (137 lb)
- Barrel length: 1.22 metres (4 ft)
- Shell: 3.35 kg (7 lb 6 oz)
- Caliber: 82 mm (3.2 in)
- Elevation: +45° to +85°
- Traverse: 6° to 11° variable with elevation
- Rate of fire: 25 -30 rpm
- Muzzle velocity: 202 m/s (660 ft/s)
- Maximum firing range: 3 km (1.9 mi)

The M-36 or 82-BM-36 (батальонный миномёт) is a Soviet 82 millimeter calibre mortar. The design of the M-36 is closely based on the earlier French Brandt mle 27/31 mortar with Russian modifications. The main difference between the 82-BM-36 and the later 82-BM-37 was the adoption of a round base-plate, revised traverse/elevation controls, simplified sights and spring-loaded shock absorbers on the bi-pod to reduce the amount of relaying needed between shots. The German designation for captured M-36 mortars was 8.2 cm GrW 274/1(r). The M-36 could fire German 81 mm ammunition but range and accuracy suffered.

== Notes ==
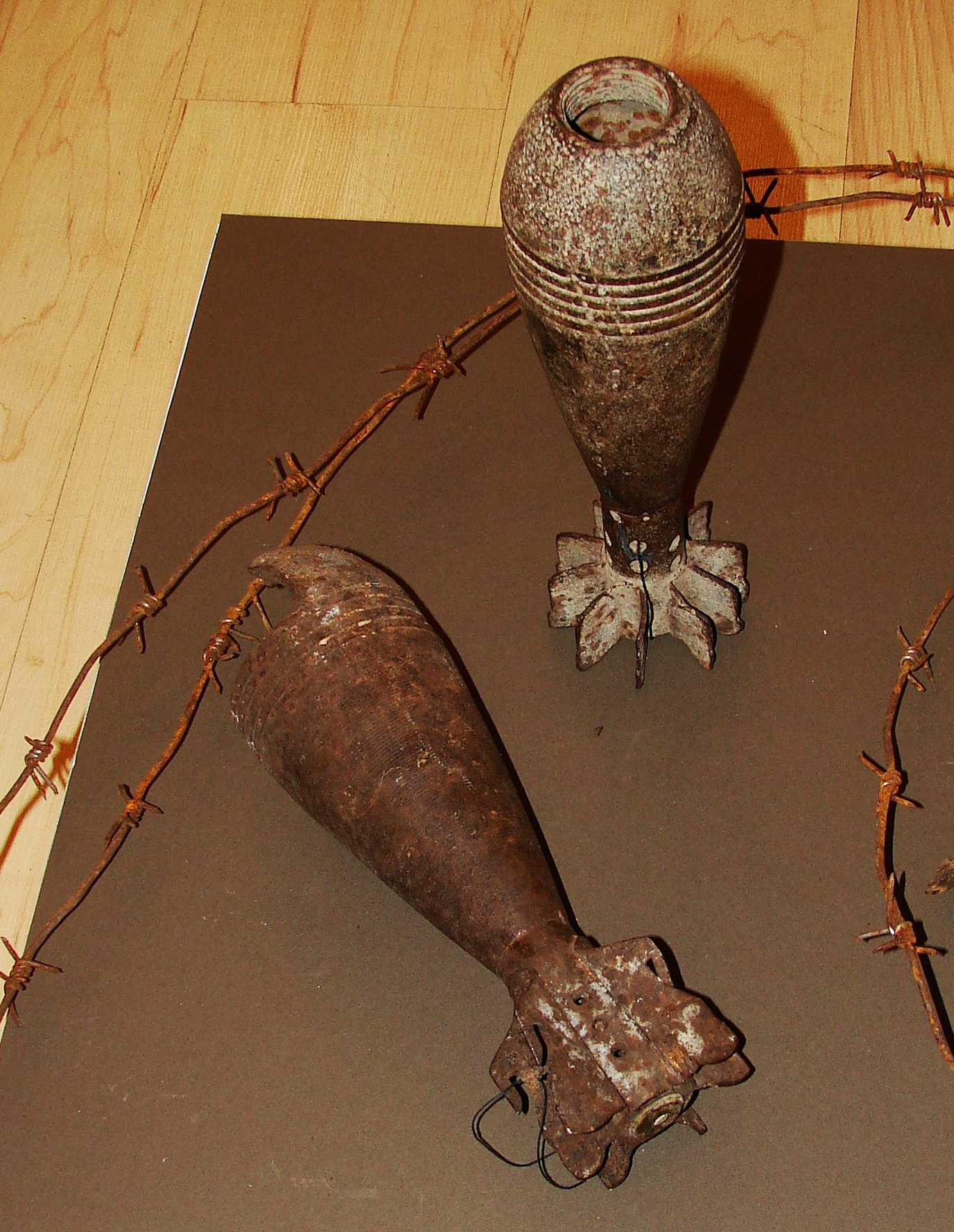
82 mm ammunition
