= 82-BM-37 =

Soviet infantry mortar

82 mm M1937 Battalion Mortar
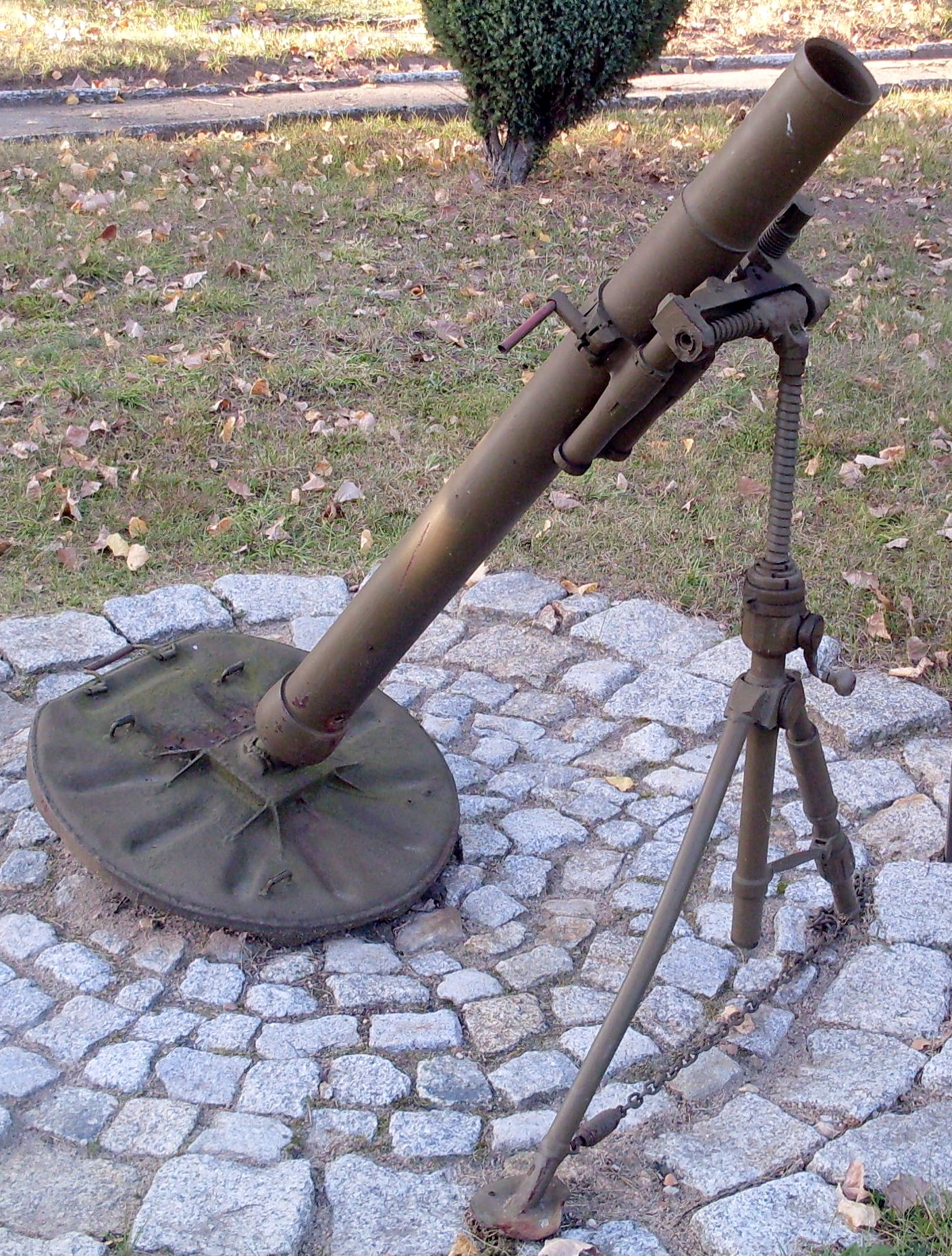
- Type: Infantry mortar
- Place of origin: Soviet Union

Service history
- In service: 1937–present
- Used by: Soviet Union
- Wars: World War II; Kosovo War; Korean War; Vietnam War; Cambodian Civil War; Rhodesian Bush War; Portuguese Colonial War; Uganda-Tanzania War; Afghan Wars; Gulf War; Syrian Civil War; Russo-Ukrainian War

Specifications
- Mass: 56 kilograms (123 lb)
- Barrel length: 1.22 metres (4 ft)
- Shell weight: 3.05 kg (6 lb 12 oz)
- Caliber: 82 millimetres (3.2 in)
- Elevation: +45° to +75°
- Traverse: 6° to 15°
- Rate of fire: 25–30 rpm
- Muzzle velocity: 211 m/s (690 ft/s)
- Maximum firing range: 3,040 m (3,320 yd)

The M-37 or 82-BM-37 (батальонный миномёт, battalion mortar) is a Soviet 82 millimeter calibre mortar designed by B.I. Shavyrin and accepted into service in 1937. The design of the M-37 is based on the earlier French Brandt mle 27/31 mortar with Russian modifications. The main difference between the 82-PM-37 and the earlier 82-PM-36 was the adoption of a round base plate, revised traverse/elevation controls, simplified sights and spring-loaded shock absorbers on the bi-pod to reduce the amount of relaying needed between shots. It was designed to be able to fire western 81 mm captured ammunition whilst not permitting the enemy the same advantage The German designation for captured M-37 mortars was 8.2 cm GrW 274/2(r).

The M-37M is an improved version with a lighter base plate and a device to prevent double loading.

It was produced in China by Norinco as the Type 53, in Egypt by the Helwan Machine Tools Company as the Model 69 and in Bulgaria by Arsenal as the M-82 Mod 1937.

== Operators ==
- Albania
- Algeria
- Afghanistan: over 1,000 in service.
- Bangladesh: Type 53
- Bulgaria
- Central African Republic
- China: Type 53
- Czech Republic
- Democratic Republic of the Congo
- Egypt: Helwan M 69 82 mm mortar
- East Germany
- Ethiopia
- Ghana
- Guinea
- Grenada
- Hungary: 50 in service.
- Indonesia use by Indonesian Marine Corps in 1960s
- Iraq
- Ivory Coast
- Kazakhstan
- North Korea
- People's Republic of Kampuchea
- Libya
- Madagascar
- Mali
- Malta: Armed Forces of Malta
- Morocco
- Pakistan
- Poland
- Nicaragua
- Romania
- Russia
- Soviet Union
- Slovakia
- Sri Lanka
- Sudan
- Syria 200 in service.
- Tanzania: Type 53
- Togo
- Uganda: Type 53
- Ukraine
  - Donetsk People's Republic
- United States: a few BM-37s used during the battle of Khe Sanh
- Vietnam: BM-37 and Type 53
